= Ontario Sustainable Energy Association =

- Type: Non-profit
- Industry: Sustainable Energy and Community Power
- Founded: Toronto, Ontario (2001)
- Headquarters: Toronto, Ontario, Canada
- Key people: Kristopher Stevens, executive director Harry French, director Community Power Services Group
- Website: www.ontario-sea.org

The Ontario Sustainable Energy Association (OSEA) is a non-profit organization supporting the growth of renewable energy and Community Power projects in the Canadian Province of Ontario. OSEA advocated an advanced renewable energy Feed-in Tariff program for Ontario, resulting in the creation of the Renewable Energy Standard Offer Program, a precursor to the Green Energy Act and, in 2007, the most progressive energy policy in North America in a decade. OSEA has approximately 130 community and industry members as well as individual members. The affairs of the association are managed by a board of directors elected by the membership.

== History ==
OSEA was incorporated in 2001, sponsored by a number of community, environmental and industrial groups to be a focal point for consolidating activities promoting community power and integrated sustainable energy. Its Board is governed by twelve directors, four of which are elected by the membership annually. OSEA has been led and managed by Kristopher Stevens since May 2008 with Deborah Doncaster, Paul Gipe and Gwen Glover having served before him.

The concerns of the group included advocacy, outreach and capacity building. OSEA focuses on creating practical advice and guidelines such as community, municipal, First Nations and developer focused guidebooks and webinars that advance the collective interests of the sector. OSEA has been at the vanguard of sector transformation through various policy papers which have helped inform the creation of key policies, regulations and programs such as the Renewable Standard Offer Program (RESOP) and the Green Energy and Economy Act.

OSEA has hosted and co-hosted five successful international exhibitions and conferences to advance the sustainable energy sector with new insights, information and business opportunities. These include

- The 7th World Wind Energy Conference in Kingston, Ontario (2008). Previous conferences had been held in Beijing, Berlin, Buenos Aires, Melbourne, and New Delhi. It was at the Kingston conference that the Green Energy Act Alliance was launched with the intent of bringing together a single voice to make conservation and renewable energy the priority in Ontario. - Three consecutive Community Power Conference held in Toronto Ontario - All-Energy Canada Exhibition and Conference in Toronto, Ontario (2014)

OSEA has approximately 130 community and industry members as well as individual members. The affairs of the association are governed by a board of directors elected by the membership.

== Policies and positions ==
The Ontario Sustainable Energy Association encourages and enables the people of Ontario to improve the environment, the economy and their health by producing clean, sustainable energy in their homes, businesses and communities. The OSEA community - staff, interns, volunteers, members, friends and supporters - are actionists (as opposed to activists) looking for (and working on) solutions. They work pro-actively to build bridges between stakeholders and seek ways to improve Ontario's energy system collaboratively recognizing that community, industry and government should all play a role in shaping Ontario's energy future.

OSEA defines sustainable energy as including:

- Renewable energy (bio, wind, hydro, solar, tidal, geo-thermal)
- Conservation, energy efficiency and demand management
- Combined heat and power (CHP) and District energy
- Storage
- Smart-grid with the convergence of the electric, thermal and telecommunications grids
- Community, public and commercial ownership of any of these structures

OSEA supports the growth of Community Power in Ontario. Community Power is a class of community-based energy projects that are owned, developed and controlled in full or in part (50 per cent or more) by residents of the community in which the project is located. Community Power proponents include local residents, farmer collaboratives, co-operatives, First Nations, municipalities and other institutions working to develop local sustainable energy projects.

A typical community spends 20 percent of its gross income buying energy, and 80 percent of those dollars leave town buying imported energy. Community-based sustainable energy developments provide an excellent opportunity to help keep energy dollars in the community, create economic development, empower residents, cut pollution and greenhouse gases and address energy security concerns. According to the Iowa Policy Project locally owned renewable energy project generates 5-10 times the local economic benefits than do conventional ownership models. From a solely economic perspective every dollar invested by local community members results in a 3 times multiplier within the community.

== Projects ==
The Community Power Services Group of OSEA helps communities with the earlier stages of their projects. Examples include:

- Whitchurch-Stouffville Community Energy Co-operative has an agreement with the town of Whitchurch-Stouffville to develop a 250KW solar power project on the roof of the Clippers Sports Complex with the intent of returning surplus revenue to the broader community and to local investors. The CPSG has assisted the co-op in securing development stage funding and has been retained as project managers.
- Beach Community Power Association is an association of neighbours and parents of students of Kew Beach Public School in Toronto. The Toronto District School Board has approved capital funding for 23KW of solar power capacity and an additional 50KW will be developed by the Beach Community Power Association as a community investment opportunity open to all residents. The CPSG has assisted the association in securing development stage funding and has been retained as project managers.
- In 2009 and 2010, neighbours and members of Neighborhood Unitarian Universalist Congregation collaborated to develop a 25KW solar power project on the south face of the church's roof. The CPSG assisted NUUC in raising the remaining $110,000 required to purchase and install their solar system by marketing their debenture investment offering to OSEA's network of 7,000+ individuals, community groups, and businesses.

== Stakeholder engagement ==
OSEA engages government, regulators and energy stakeholders on an ongoing basis to ensure that communities are empowered to develop their local sustainable energy resources for a greener, healthier future. OSEA advocated an advanced renewable energy Feed-in Tariff program for Ontario, resulting in the creation of the Renewable Energy Standard Offer Program, a precursor to the Green Energy Act and, in 2007, the most progressive energy policy in North America in a decade.

- The campaign for the Green Energy and Green Economy Act – OSEA successfully campaigned for a Green Energy Act for Ontario, resulting in the adoption of the Green Energy and Green Economy Act (2009) and the Feed-in Tariff program, making Ontario a leader in renewable energy policy.
- The creation of the Community, Aboriginal and Municipal Energy Partnership programs
- The aboriginal loan guarantee program
- Creation of the Community Power Fund
- Current work focuses on the evolution of the FIT program and the transition to integrated energy policy.

== Research resources and manuals ==
OSEA has produced a number of well researched resources to help inform the discussion about Ontario's evolution towards a 100% sustainable energy system including:

- Nuclear Power: Where's the Business Case? – December 2011
- Getting to FIT 2.0 – December 2011
- Storage
- Community Power Financing Guidebook: Resource manual covering pre-development financing, land acquisition, permitting and approvals, legal contracting, resource assessment, community engagement, and membership development and relations. This guidebook is intended to familiarize Community Power proponents with these early project activities and their financial implications given Ontario's current renewable energy and fiscal policy context.
- Initiating Your Co-operative Solar PV Community Power Project: This toolkit is designed for those interested in solar photovoltaic (PV) and renewable energy co-operatives. This resource kit provides essential information on starting a co-operative solar PV renewable energy project.

== Conferences, webinars and workshops ==
- Community Power 2011: brought the community and commercial power sustainable energy sector together to discuss the FIT review, Green Energy Ontario 2.0, and practical training on how to drive community-led and community-commercial project partnerships.
- World Wind Energy Conference in Kingston, Ontario, 2008: hosted jointly with the World Wind Energy Association, focused on Community Power and drew more than 800 delegates from around the world including five provincial ministers.
- OSEA FIT Webinar Series: This is a series of webinars addressing issues around the Feed In Tariff. For example, the Friday February 10, 2012 instance addressed Hydro One connection including the role of Hydro One, third party contractors and the rules regarding alternative bid options recently clarified by the Ontario Energy Board. It included hearing directly from Hydro One on progress being made on grid upgrades and policies regarding capacity and what they mean to projects.
- Special OSEA Interview Series: This series addressed the political outlook on the future of renewable energy and conservation in Ontario. It included interviews with three of the four main parties on the future of Green Energy in Ontario. The interviews, conducted by Kris Stevens, were held just prior to the provincial elections in 2011.
- Building Capacity Through a Multi-Skilling Model: A research workshop held at the Earth Rangers Centre at Woodbridge Ontario, it addressed the development of a vision and strategy for Building Capacity Through a Multi-Skilling Model. The 44 attendees included NGOs, colleges, companies, First Nations, unions and consultants and their discussion is published as a whitepaper.
- Community Power Roadmap To Success: Aimed at engaging established community-based organizations and institutional groups with assets and to build up their capacity to collaborate on their own community power projects, this was a series of 14 hands-on workshops where attendees walked through a prospect for a project to give them the basic tools required to get a community solar power project started.

== Public education campaign ==
Centered on conservation and renewable energy this includes:

- Advertising
- Video contest on renewable energy projects
- Real time online map showcasing green energy supporters, conservation and renewable energy projects
- Community engagement and partnership best practices

== See also ==
- Jeff Mole on Community Energy in Ontario
- Electricity sector in Canada
- Energy policy of Canada
- List of wind farms in Canada
- Renewable energy commercialization
- Renewable energy in Canada
- Solar power in Canada
- Wind power in Canada
- Science and technology in Canada
- V2G
- Melancthon EcoPower Centre
- Association of Power Producers of Ontario
