= Renewable energy in Canada =

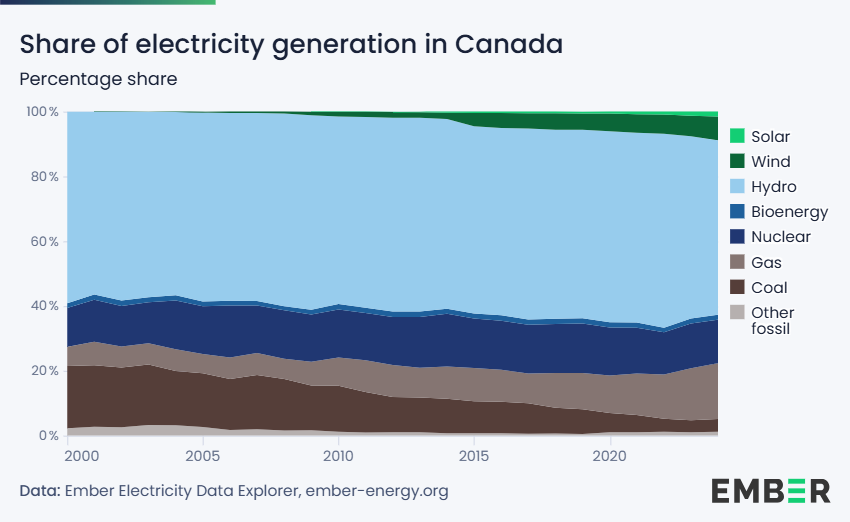
Share of electricity generation in Canada - percentage share

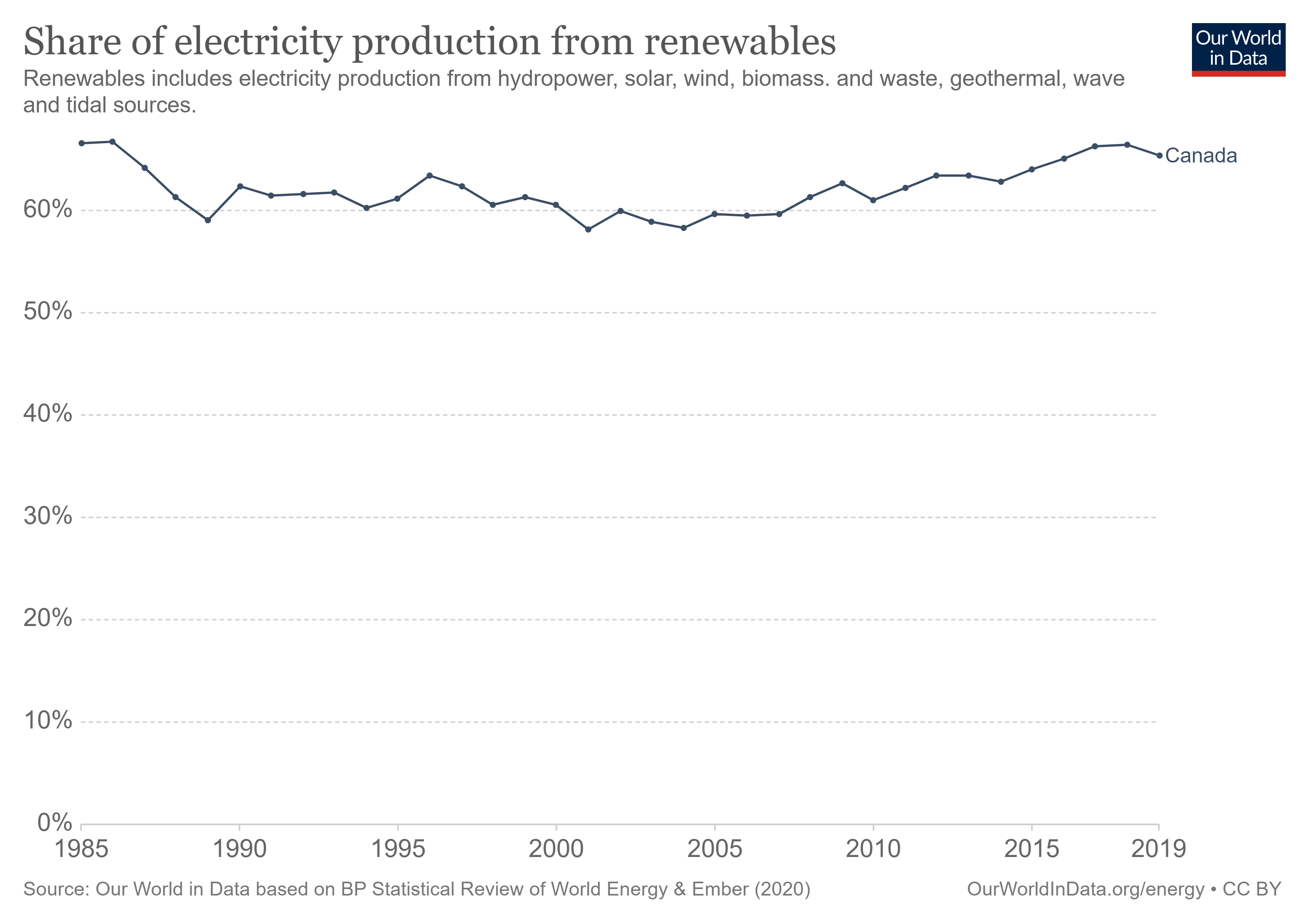
Share of electricity production from renewables from 1985 to 2019 in Canada

Renewable energy in Canada represented 17.3% of the Total Energy Supply (TES) in 2020, following natural gas at 39.1% and oil at 32.7% of the TES.

In 2025, Canada generated 639.5 TWh of electricity. Renewable sources accounted for 64.1% of total generation, including 54.5% from hydroelectricity, 8.2% from wind and 1.4% from solar. Canda remained one of the world's largest producers of hydroelectric power.

From 2010 to 2017, the Environmental and Clean Technology (ECT) sector's growth rate outpaced Canada's overall economy by one-third. According to Simon Fraser University's Clean Energy Canada program, by June 2020, the sector employed 430,500 workers across Canada.

== Overview ==
According to a 2017 Natural Resources Canada (NRCAN) document, renewable energy refers to energy sources that are replenished naturally and at a rate that is equal to or faster than the rate at which they are utilized. A variety of techniques and equipment in the environmental and clean technologies (ECT) sector have been developed and used to harness renewable resources for energy production.

Total renewable energy capacity, 2014-2024 (MW)
2014	2015	2016	2017	2018	2019	2020	2021	2022	2023	2024
89,773	95,973	97,881	99,131	100,743	101,328	101,812	103,808	106,359	108,826	110,470

The Daily reported in 2017, that the strong sales in renewable energy technologies and equipment reflected transitions made by Canada's towards a low-carbon economy. Companies engaged in these power generating projects including wind, solar, and hydro, reported revenues of $1.3 billion which represented 38% of total ECT sales.

In June 2021, the federal government invested $964-million program in ECT in the form of "wind, solar, storage, hydro, geothermal, tidal" and other renewable energy projects to lower emissions.

Politicians have expressed interest in increasing the percentage of Canada's electricity generated by renewable methods. Ontario has created a subsidy to assist wind and solar power producers.

All environmental and clean technology (ECT) activities accounted for 3.1% or $59.3 billion of the Canadian gross domestic product in 2016, edging up from 3.0% in 2007.

As of 2024, approximately 79% of Canada's electricity generation came from low-carbon sources, including hydroelectricity, wind, solar, and nuclear. Hydroelectric power remained the dominant source, accounting for roughly 55% of electricity generation, while wind and solar together contributed about 8.5%.

Canada has set a goal of achieving a net-zero electricity by 2035 as part of its broader strategy to reach economy-wide net-zero greenhouse-gas emissions by 2050.

== Environmental and clean technology sector ==
The environmental and clean technology (ECT) sector includes goods and services that reduce environmental impact, such as such as renewable energy, clean electricity from wind, solar energy, and other renewable sources, power generation from nuclear sources, biofuels, waste management, and remediation services. Examples include designing and building structures that are energy-efficient and manufacturing solar panels, and Quebec's "municipal waste-to-energy industry".

In 2019, the value of the Canadian environmental and clean technology products sector was $70.5 billion, compared to $59.3 billion in 2016, representing 3% of the Canadian GDP. From 2010 to 2017, the sector experienced a growth rate that was one-third higher than the rest of the country's economy. The environmental and clean technology (ECT) products sector saw a 3.5% increase in GDP from 2018 to 2019.

All environmental and clean technology (ECT) activities accounted for 3.1% or $59.3 billion of the Canadian gross domestic product in 2016, edging up from 3.0% in 2007.

Simon Fraser University's Clean Energy Canada program reported that there were 430,500 ECT sector jobs in Canada in 2020.

In 2019, there were 339,000 ECT jobs in Canada, representing 1.7% of all jobs. Sixty percent of ECT workers had at least a high school education, about 25% had a college degree and about 20% had a university degree. Over 90% of jobs in the sector were full-time.

In Canada and the United States, clean energy workers tend to earn higher wages than the national median. In 2019, in Canada, males in administrative and regulatory positions in the ECT sector earned an annual salary of $93,294 on average; while women earned less—$64,363. The average annual wage in Canada was $63,490 in 2019, while in the ECT sector it was $$77,144.

== Sources ==
=== Hydroelectricity ===
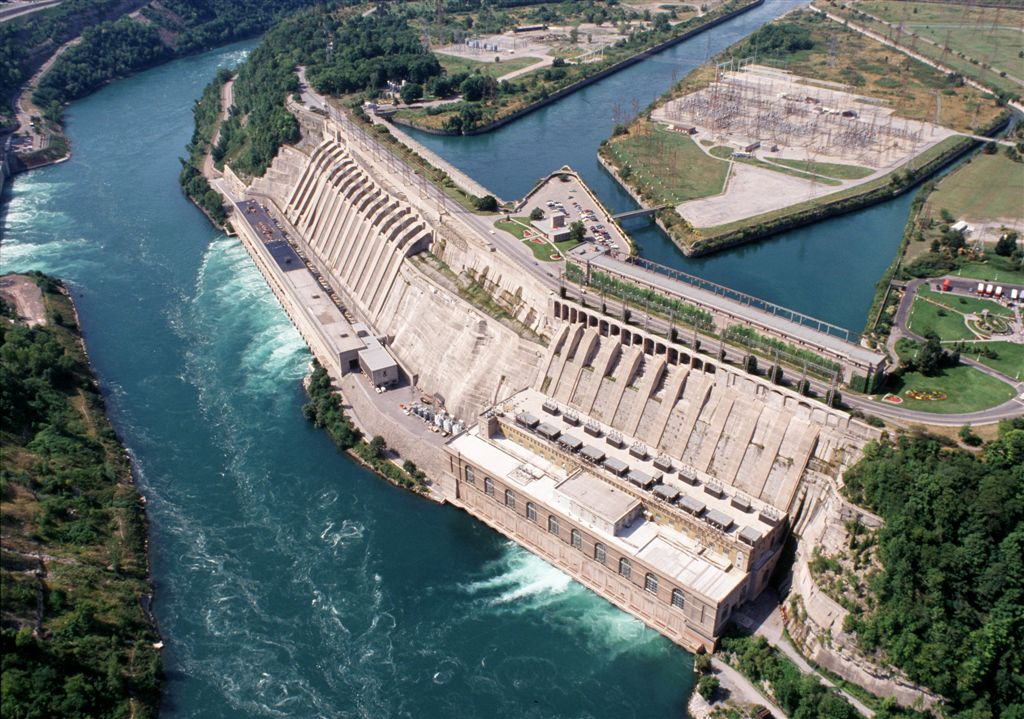
Sir Adam Beck Hydroelectric Generating Stations, Ontario

In 2014, Canada had 542 hydroelectric stations with an installed capacity of 78,359 megawatts. Hydroelectricity has developed in Canada where geography and hydrography have permitted, particularly in Quebec which generates half of the hydroelectric power produced in Canada. Yet environmental and social issues will persist if sustainable hydro-power projects are not planned carefully. Some examples of this include stagnation of water, fish migration issues, uprooting of communities, habitat loss and possible extinction of species. Between 2005 and 2019 hydroelectricity continued to dominate the growth of renewables in Canada with 40,000 GWh of new production compared to wind and solar combined with 30,000 GWh of new production.

Canada has 81 gigawatts (GW) of installed hydroelectric capacity, that produced 400 terawatt-hours (TWh) of electricity in 2019. Manitoba, British Columbia, Newfoundland and Labrador, Yukon and Quebec produce over 90% of their power from hydroelectricity.

Hydropower capacity 2014–2024 (MW)
2014	2015	2016	2017	2018	2019	2020	2021	2022	2023	2024
75,474	79,405	80,304	80,831	81,570	81,570	81,383	82,307	83,312	83,312	83,455

In recent years, Canada has embarked on the commissioning of several significant hydroelectric projects, which are expected to be operational by 2024. Notable among these are the Site C project in British Columbia with a capacity of 1,100 megawatts (MW), the Muskrat Falls project in Labrador (824 MW), the Keeyask project in Manitoba (695 MW), and the La Romaine 4 project in Quebec (245 MW). In addition to these large-scale projects, progress is also being made on a number of smaller hydro initiatives.

=== Solar power ===
Solar photovoltaic (PV) contributes only 0.51% of Canada's total renewable energy output, though this number is growing as the total installed solar capacity reached 2662 megawatts in 2016. Solar PV potential varies across Canada, with the highest insolation in the southernmost portion of the prairies and the lowest in the north and coastal regions. The benefits of using solar energy include the absence of harmful emissions and the long equipment lifespan (about 25 years). The drawbacks to using solar energy are the high environmental footprint required in areas of lower insolation leading to habitat degradation and the inability to store energy for extended periods of time. The reliance on sunlight to generate electricity is difficult in northern areas due to shorter daytime hours and cloud cover in the winter. The levelized cost for using solar energy is currently approximately 23 cents per kWh.

Southern Canada has plentiful solar energy resources, with the most extensive resources being found in southern Saskatchewan, Alberta, Manitoba, and Ontario.

With 1210 megawatt peak (MWp) of installed photovoltaics in 2013, Canada ranked 15th in the world. Ontario has a program of moving away from coal and promoting renewable resources which has led to many industrial-scale photo-voltaic plants being built. Located in Sarnia, Ontario, the 97 megawatt Sarnia Photovoltaic Power Plant can power more than 12,000 homes, and in October 2010 was the largest solar farm in the world. Other plants include the 23.4 MW Arnprior Solar Generating Station and a 68 MW solar farm in Sault Ste. Marie.

Until 2009, the main applications of solar energy technologies in Canada were for solar thermal system applications for space heating, water heating and drying crops and lumber. In 2001, there were more than 12,000 residential solar water heating systems and 300 commercial / industrial solar hot water systems in use. These systems presently comprise a small fraction of Canada's energy use.

Solar energy capacity 2014–2024 (MW)
2014	2015	2016	2017	2018	2019	2020	2021	2022	2023	2024
2,108	2,877	3,058	3,419	3,719	4,007	4,379	5,261	5,439	5,884	6,105

Canada has many regions that are sparsely populated and difficult to reach. Photovoltaic (PV) cells are increasingly used as standalone units, mostly as off-grid distributed electricity generation to power remote homes, telecommunications equipment, oil, and pipeline monitoring stations and navigational devices. The Canadian PV market has grown, and Canadian companies make solar modules, controls, specialised water pumps, high-efficiency refrigerators and solar lighting systems.

One of the most important uses for PV cells is in northern communities, many of which depend on high-cost diesel fuel to generate electricity. Since the 1970s, the federal government and industry have encouraged the development of solar technologies for these communities. Some of these efforts have focused on the use of hybrid systems that provide power 24 hours a day, using solar power when sunlight is available, in combination with another energy source.

The National Energy Board of Canada expects that by 2040, solar power will generate 1.2% of the country's electricity while wind will provide 9.5%.

=== Agrivoltaics in Canada ===
Agrivoltaics is gaining attention in Canada as a promising way to combine solar energy production with agriculture. This method allows solar panels to be installed on farmland without stopping crop growth or livestock grazing. It offers a solution to land use conflicts by making dual use of the same space.

Recent research has shown that installing solar panels on just 1% of Canada's agricultural land could generate between a quarter and over a third of the country’s total electricity needs. Provinces like Alberta, Saskatchewan, and Ontario have especially high potential due to their large farmland areas and good sunlight levels. Agrivoltaics also supports Canada's goals to reduce greenhouse gas emissions and increase renewable energy use. Additionally, since Canada's potential for agrivoltaic electricity exceeds the country's electricity demand, Canada could export green electricity to the United States in the future.

=== Wind power ===
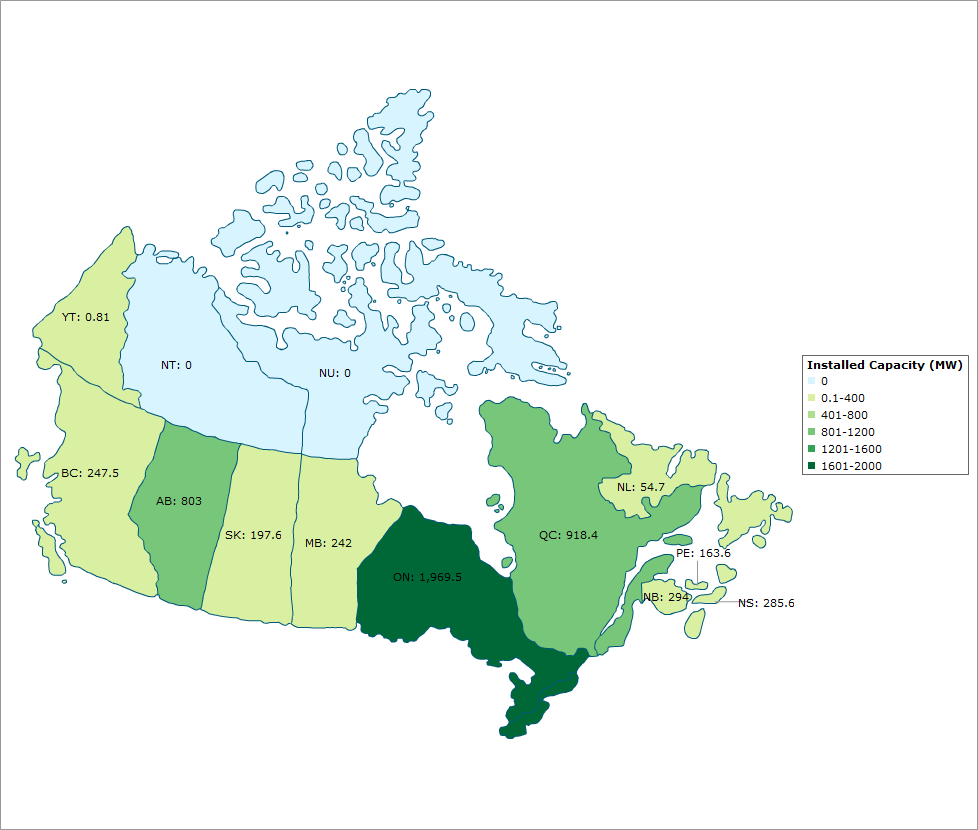
Installed wind power capacity by province (2012)

Wind power represents 4.6% of Canada's total renewable energy capacity, with many optimal locations for wind energy across Canada and an installed wind capacity of 12,239 MW. Wind power generation does not generate GHG emissions and has no fuel cost. In remote Canadian communities projects with wind-diesel hybrid systems have shown limited success over the past 25 years. This is mostly due to the expensive installation, maintenance, and transportation logistics required when providing power to remote sites. Ideal locations for turbines are based on wind speeds at locations which may or may not be near a local power line. In the latter case, transmission lines are necessary to tie into the local power grid, increasing the total cost. The levelized cost for wind energy is approximately 13 cents per kWh

Wind energy capacity 2014–2024 (MW)
2014	2015	2016	2017	2018	2019	2020	2021	2022	2023	2024
9,694	11,214	11,973	12,250	12,816	13,220	13,532	13,722	15,081	16,989	18,376

As of December 2017, wind power generating capacity was 12,252 megawatts (MW), representing about 6% of Canada's generating capacity. In 2009 the Canadian Wind Energy Association, the wind industry lobby group, outlined a future strategy for wind energy that would reach a capacity of 55 GW by 2025, meeting 20% of the country's energy needs. By 2024, installed wind capacity had reached about 18.4 GW nationwide.

The CEO of Calgary-based Greengate Power, Dan Balaban, who also co-founded Business Renewables Centre Canada, said that Canada would have to build an additional 5.5 gigawatts of wind and solar capacity annually in order to reach its goals of reaching "net-zero by 2050". In 2022, he said that Canada was "nowhere near on track to do that." With the financial security provided by the Amazon contracts, Greengate Power has the largest wind farm in Canada, according to The Narwhal. Constant, strong winds from the Rocky Mountain foothills in southwest Alberta results in turbines generating more energy than elsewhere.

In addition to using wind farms of large conventional turbines, another option for harnessing wind power is vertical axis wind turbines. These are often much smaller and can be suitable to operate in a city. They can also be useful for remote locations which are far from the main grid. Small rooftop units have already been purchased and installed by private citizens.

=== Geothermal ===
Geothermal energy uses the heat of the Earth's mantle to produce electricity. Low temperature geothermal resources can be used for domestic heating purposes, however, to produce electricity using geothermal energy, very high temperatures (>150 °C) are required. The most prospective locations are in Western and Northern Canada. Although operational and maintenance costs are low, the upfront capital costs are high, therefore a large demand for produced energy is required. The majority of potential high temperature deposits in Canada tend to either have no carrier fluid (such as water) or are impermeable, and tend to exist in remote locations with no access to the grid. Canada currently has 167 megawatts of installed capacity for heating purposes. As of 2018, there are no installed electrical-generating geothermal facilities in Canada.

=== Bio-energy ===
Bio-energy Generating Capacity in Canadian provinces (in megawatts)
Provinces	Total biomass
Newfoundland and Labrador	27
Prince Edward Island	2
Nova Scotia	66
New Brunswick	113
Quebec	205
Ontario	681
Manitoba	52
Saskatchewan	16
Alberta	55
British Columbia	827
Canada	2,043

Bioenergy is a source of renewable energy that uses a variety of organic materials, referred to as biomass. Biomass is any biological material in liquid, solid, or gaseous form that is either a product of direct-photosynthesis or indirect-photosynthesis. These products include: wood[wastes], municipal solid waste, manures, agricultural substances, separated household waste and sewage sludge, wastes streams, and also remaining substances found in forestry and related industries. However, the most commonly employed biomass is wood; wood waste is used to produce heat for industrial facilities, create steam for electricity production, and also for water and space heating.

Canada has been in a fortunate position, as it has abundant amounts of biomass products available (mainly from the forestry industry). This renewable energy source has been growing within the Canadian industry, providing a variety of new jobs to replace the lost jobs that were formerly reliant on traditional forest-related jobs.

Furthermore, after the steep decline in the paper and pulp industry over the past 20 years, bio-energy has become an integral part of Canada's renewable energy sector. In 2014, Canada amassed a total of 70 bio-energy power plants with a capacity of 2,043 megawatts (as seen in the table below), with a central focus on wood biomass. Moreover, a total of 8.7 gigawatt-hours (GWh) of current was created by using wood, organic municipal solid wastes and landfill gas; this was most prominently seen where forestry industries are still prevalent: British Columbia, Ontario, Quebec, Alberta, and New Brunswick.

Bioenergy capacity 2014–2024 (MW)
2014	2015	2016	2017	2018	2019	2020	2021	2022	2023	2024
2,651	2,631	2,700	2,785	2,792	2,685	2,691	2,691	2,700	2,700	2,700

==== Biofuel ====
Biofuel is a term that is often used to describe liquid bio-energies, and is a renewable energy that is made from biological material. Biomass from agricultural waste, and crops are predominantly used to make biofuel. Biofuel may be classified into two categories, dependent on their source. Primary biofuel are made from unprocessed, natural materials (e.g. wood chips). Secondary biofuel are made from processed primary energy sources to better adapt them to a broader range of applications (e.g. ethanol). Canada is considered to be a major biofuel producer in the world. Canada produces over 250 million L per year. In recent years, the Canadian government has begun funding the research and development of biofuel production. A 5% biofuel mandate was implemented with coordination between federal and provincial governments back in 2010. Agriculture Canada has provided funding for the sector as well, totalling CAD $10 million through the Biofuel Opportunities for Producers Initiative (BOPI). These funds will aid developers gather the necessary capital to commence biofuel projects nationwide. Today, production of renewable energy such as biofuels contributes CAD$2 billion annually to the Canadian economy.

In 2011, fossil fuels accounted for the majority of energy consumption in Canada. Petroleum and natural gas accounted for 56.2% of the country's total energy consumption. The depletion of non renewable energy and its increasing costs have been fueling Canada's shift towards finding sustainable and environmentally-friendly alternatives. Biofuels are considered to have many benefits when compared to more traditional fuels. Biofuel reduce greenhouse gas emissions (GHGs) and also reduce the reliance on fossil fuels. Canada is well-placed to become one of the top producers of biofuel in the world, however has experienced a relatively slow start to biofuel production. Canada's potential growth as a global leader in biofuel production exists thanks to a robust agricultural sector, which can produce significant amounts of biofuel feedstocks. Canada produces about 1.4hm of ethanol per year. Additionally, wastes from the agriculture industry, forestry and households have the potential to be turned into ethanol.

The implementation of the Environmental Protection Act by the Canadian government in 2008 requires that gasoline in the country consist of at least 5% biofuel. There are additional mandates in place that require at least 2% biodiesel content in diesel and heating oil. That would require that Canada produce at least 2hm of ethanol per year, therefore opening the door to a significant increase in ethanol production in the coming years. This would equate to an additional 1.9 billion liters of ethanol that is needed to be produced to meet demand. Ethanol in Canada is produced from cereal grains. Corn and wheat account for virtually all ethanol output. Quebec has been shifting from ethanol being produced by corn to cellulosic ethanol from forests and household waste. The federal government started the Ethanol Expansion Program back in 2008, with an objective to kick-start its production across the country. Subsidies were given to producers to entice them in continuing ethanol production, while reducing GHG emissions. The developments in the biofuel sector will have major impacts on the Canadian economy, especially the agricultural sector in the years to come, according the authors of a 2009 book entitled Biofuels-- at what cost?, which questioned multi-billion dollar government subsidies because of environmental concerns such as water usage, land usage and habitat loss, and nitrogen runoff. The authors questioned the robustness of governmental bi-annual reviews of the environmental impacts of biofuel production. The authors suggest that electric cars, and more efficient engines were preferable to the use of biofuels.

=== Ocean power ===
Among the forms of renewable energy, ocean energy includes multiple methods. As the technologies continue to develop, with lessons learned from the offshore oil and gas industries, ocean energy production is approaching economically viable reality, although relatively unproven. Around the world, methods including Ocean Thermal Energy Conversion, ocean current energy, wave energy, tidal energy, and osmotic energy are being tested. "In-stream turbine technology" is being tested in the Minas Passage, Nova Scotia by the Fundy Ocean Research Centre for Energy (FORCE).

In-stream tidal turbine technology is a relatively simple design. An elevated turbine is submerged under water in a location that enables its movement with tidal cycles. As the blades of the turbine move, they create energy that powers an electric generator at the base. From here the power travels to a cable attached to the seafloor and back to an offsite facility, where it can be added to the power grid.

While this technology has shown to be successful in its early stages of testing, FORCE has not officially begun the process for energy collection. However, the installation of the undersea cable in December 2013 indicates that the project is moving along swiftly.

A megawatt-scale turbine was installed at Cape Sharp near Partridge Island in November 2016. Its owner, Open Hydro, went into insolvency in August 2018; the project is thus finished.

Canada’s energy requirements are expected to increase by as much as 150 GWh from 2005 to 2030, with the ocean is a potential source to address growing energy consumption. Canada's Bay of Fundy has potential for the highest tidal energy production in the world. As the home of the world’s highest tides, which can reach 12.94 meters high in Burncoat Head, N.S., plans to convert large volumes of water into workable energy has been on and off the back burner of Canadian energy interest groups for decades. Research into feasibility and energy production site selections go as far back as the sixties, with national interest peaking during the oil crisis of the seventies and waning afterwards. Now, with the increasing demand for safe, clean and environmentally sustainable energy production, use of the ocean for energy production is once again at the forefront of interest and development.

On the east coast, in Annapolis Royal, Nova Scotia, was the Annapolis Royal tidal power station, which finished construction in 1986. This station was a flow control barrier, capable of producing 20 MW but was shut down in 2019 after a crucial component failure and was further prevented from re-entering service due to the heavy toll it took on local wildlife, such as much as a quarter of all American Shad that passed through the turbines being killed.

Despite worries over environmental impacts, several other potential sites around the Bay of Fundy, including the Cumberland Basin, Shepody Bay and the Minas Basin all were scoped out with a myriad of possible designs and power production possibilities being drawn up for each of them, with many more to follow as the technologies develop. The clear favourite of these top three spots was the proposed tidal power production facility across the Minas Basin, with a projected energy production being measure at 4865 MW, 2.6 GW and even as much as 48 GW.

One consideration of ocean energy not to be overlooked is the concurrent development and use of the ocean and its resources by all manners of industries, hobbyists, and wildlife. Power production facilities require their own space and can become danger to the animals and humans that get too close. One proposed solution that is seeing success along the North-East coast of Europe is Marine Spatial Planning, where instead of the free for all that naturally developed as humans increased their use of the ocean through fishing, transportation and industry, the government steps in to assign distinguished areas for each of these activities. In an area as small and densely trafficked, Marine Spatial Planning could be a great tool in the development and testing of ocean energy technologies in Canada.

== Provinces and territories ==
=== Alberta ===
Energy generation from renewable sources increased by 66% between 2005—with 4,782 GW.h generated from renewables—to 2015, when 7,947 GW.h, representing 10% of total power generation in the province.

In June 2014, Medicine Hat, Alberta, opened the concentrated solar thermal installation connected to a thermal plant that was already in existence. Power from the installation along with natural gas fired plant provided power to the city. From 2008 to 2014, the city with considerable supply of natural gas reserves had invested about $4 million in renewable energy in a program called "Hat Smart". This included about a 100 projects involving solar energy.

As of 2018, Alberta had the highest GHG emission levels contributing to 37% of Canada's GHG emissions.

In December 2021, the Blackspring Ridge Wind Project expanded to 353MW.

According to a June 14, 2022 article in The Narwhal, one of the largest solar farms in Canada was in southern Alberta. The company, Travers Solar Farm secured a very large Amazon contract which provides stability for the company from volatility in the energy market. Amazon, which had also entered into large contracts for solar energy with the Calgary-based Greengate Power, benefits from the flexibility of Alberta's unique electricity system—which is not a monopoly or government owned—according to a University of Calgary economics professor, Blake Shaffer. Shaffer said that Alberta was experiencing a renewables boom in 2022, partly because the province has an "embarrassment of wind and solar riches", as the southern regions of both Alberta and Saskatchewan have the "best solar insolation in the country. As well, oil companies in Alberta are also making significant investments in renewable energy to "offset emissions".

=== British Columbia ===
As of 2016 98.4% of BC's electricity was generated from renewable sources. Hydro was the primary source of power generation (88%) followed by biomass at (9%) and wind (1.4%). As of 2016 there are four wind farms in operation in B.C of more than 10 MW of generation. Provincial Crown corporations own and operate about 80% of Renewable Energy infrastructure.

In 2024, BC Hydro committed to significantly increasing its wind energy capacity by initiating nine new wind farm projects. These are set to enhance the province's grid capacity by 8% with a total generation of nearly 5,000 gigawatt hours per year. This C$6 billion investment not only boosts British Columbia's renewable energy output but also strengthens partnerships with First Nations, who hold a 51% ownership in most of these projects, aligning economic development with environmental sustainability.

=== Manitoba ===
Most of Manitoba's electricity is generated through hydro-power. As of 2016, over 15 hydroelectric plants are located by the Nelson River. Two wind power facilities built at St. Leon and St. Joseph contribute over 200 MW of power. Provincial taxes were implemented on the use of coal and petroleum. There were plans to ban coal as a resource by 2017. Plans to reduce GHG's by 1/3 by the year 2030.

=== Ontario ===
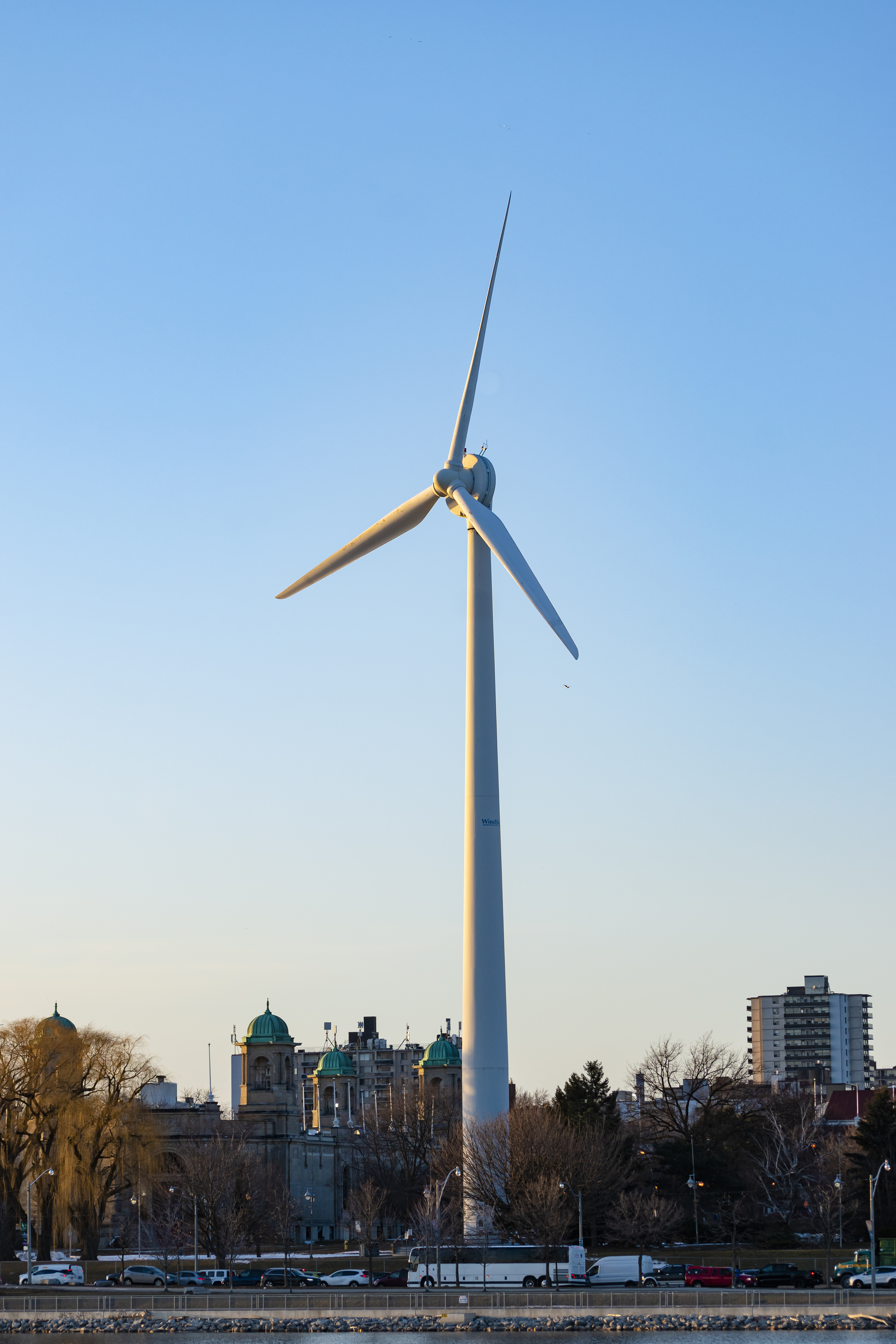
ExPlace Wind Turbine, the first wind turbine in Ontario

Ontario led Canada with its wind and solar power capacity. The province phased out coal in 2014. The majority of the population used biomass energy. As of 2018 the Doug Ford administration cancelled the cap and trade program: "Effective July 3, 2018, we cancelled the cap and trade regulation and prohibited all trading of emission allowances." Current Provincial goals indicate a desire to increase renewable energy to over 20,000 MW by 2025 (half of the current generation).

As of 2018, the province has the second highest GHG emission levels contributing to 23% of Canada's GHG emissions.

Ontario's Green Energy and Green Economy Act, 2009 (GEGEA), previously in force, took a two-pronged approach to creating a renewable energy economy. The first was to bring more renewable energy sources to the province and the second was the creation of more energy efficiency measures to help conserve energy. The bill also appointed a Renewable Energy Facilitator to provide "one-window" assistance and support to project developers to help with project approvals. The approval process for transmission projects was also streamlined, and for the first time in Ontario, the bill enacted standards for renewable energy projects. Home owners had access to incentives to develop small-scale renewables such as low or no-interest loans to finance the capital cost of renewable energy generating facilities like solar panels.

The Act was controversial because it featured a feed-in tariff to fund the construction and operation of renewable energy infrastructure. This has driven up fees to the point that Ontario's electricity costs are among the highest in North America. Despite the vast expense of replacing coal generation with renewables, the reduction in air pollution has been minimal. The same results could have been achieved by retrofits to the existing coal power plants, at one-tenth the cost.

In 2018 with the election of a Conservative government, the minister of Energy, Northern Development and Mines announced the government was scrapping the Act and cancelling 750 energy contracts at a saving of $750 million for Ontario energy consumers. It was reported that the cost of the cancellation of a single one of these projects could reach $100 million, so the true cost to taxpayers of the cancellation of the Act is yet unknown

=== Northwest Territories ===
Energy use in the NWT can be split roughly into thirds – 1/3 electricity, 1/3 heating and 1/3 transportation. Roughly 1/3 of electricity generated in the NWT is renewable, with the majority coming from hydro-electricity. and smaller contributions from wind and solar PV. Roughly 10% of heating energy in the NWT is renewable, with the majority coming from wood pellets and smaller contributions from cordwood. The Northwest Territories has a high potential to generate energy through hydro and wind power. Initiatives were in place to expand and promote the use of biomass, wind power, and solar energy.

=== Nunavut ===
Almost all electricity is generated from Diesel fuel. Power lines to transport energy from Manitoba to Nunavut are in planning stages. Goals in place to reduce dependency on fossil fuels. There are currently no real renewable sources of energy or infrastructure that exists in the territory.

=== Quebec ===
Crown corporations own and generate most electricity in the province. Electricity is nearly all made from renewable sources. Hydro energy generating most of the electricity. Goals to reduce GHG emissions are set for 2020; through the implementation of the Climate Change Action Plan. Wind power provides over 4000 MW of electricity.

=== Saskatchewan ===
Coal is the primary source of energy followed by natural gas, hydro, and then wind power. Net-metering policies are in place. Initiatives are being implemented to add more wind farms to the current list of 5; Saskatchewan is hoping double wind power generation by 2017. Plans are being generated to develop Solar energy projects. Emissions from Saskatchewan contributes to over 18% of Canada's GHG emissions.

=== Yukon ===
Most electricity is generated by hydro but province also relies on diesel and Liquefied natural gas (LNG) to meet demand. Biomass energy strategies are in place to contribute towards home heating.

== Responsibilities of levels of government ==
In Canada, the authority to legislate and put in place policies on renewable energy is divided between three levels of government — the federal, provincial, and local / municipal governments. Since the enactment of the Constitution Act, 1867, the power to legislate the use of natural resources remains mainly in the hands of the provincial governments as they have the power to govern and manage the natural resources that fall within its territorial boundaries. Accordingly, section 92(a) of the Constitution Act and its amendments from 1982 entails that provinces have total control over the forestry, electricity and other non-renewable energy sources. Furthermore, this also includes the power to put in place taxes and royalties against resource extraction operations. Moreover, provinces also obtained the authority to explore and develop both renewable and non-renewable sources of energy as well as manage facilities (and sites) responsible for generating electricity. Provinces were given authority to manage and plan for the use of provincial lands and thus acquired the right to develop their strategic energy market.

Responsibilities of the federal government differ completely. They include creating national legislation that regulates the trade and sale of renewable and non-renewable energy both nationwide and internationally. The federal authority also maintains and develops policies regarding fisheries. Moreover, it is tasked to create and enact laws to raise money and taxes of any sort, and as well as manage land resources owned by the federal government. Hypothetically, the federal government can neither interfere nor act on any territories owned or operated by the province but can indirectly influence them by setting the national agenda.

Finally, municipal/local governments which do not have the same level of authority to enact laws as the provincial and Federal Government, do influence the policy-making and implementation process. The power given to municipal governments is outlined in provincial legislation which allows local governments to create by-laws according to its constituency, and also includes issuing its own zoning regulations and construction permits. Similarly, indigenous communities and leaders practice as the primary authority on local native lands and reserves. Any resources that fall within indigenous borders remain under the control of the community and its leaders. As federal and provincial laws are required to be administered within the respective territories of Canada, it is a municipal government that is responsible for implementing such legislation.

One way that governments (usually federal) can increase the amount of renewable energy is by reallocating energy subsidies. By phasing out fossil fuel subsidies and replacing them with funding for renewable energy, the federal government would be able to accelerate the energy transition to meet their climate goals. Another impactful government action is carbon pricing. As of 2026, Canada has an industrial carbon tax, but has cancelled its consumer carbon tax. Both carbon taxes were proven to reduce emissions.

=== Civil society and interest groups ===
Numerous civil society interest groups are involved in the renewable energy policy-making process in Canada. These groups vary in their beliefs: they include non-profit organizations, environmental activist groups, as well as corporate interest groups with high levels of investment in industries other than renewable energy.

As a democracy it is uncommon for a policy to pass without some form of public participation, typically attended by active individual citizens and various interest groups. Members of these groups can be academic experts with first-hand knowledge of the topic/issue and can provide valuable information to help inform policymakers to create legislation. These groups can also consist of industries that have a stake in an issue area and might lobby on behalf of their private interests whether it is political, financial, or social.

Examples of some influential interest groups lobbying the Canadian government in the energy and environmental sector include the Canadian Association of Petroleum Producers (an organization dedicated to representing the interests of the oil sands) and the natural gas industry in Canada. Another private interest lobby group is the Mining Association of Canada, responsible for representing corporations interested in mining projects, and mineral exploration and industrial lobby groups. (Note: Includes the Canadian Energy Pipeline Association, Canadian Electricity Association, Canadian Vehicle Manufacturers’ Association, and the Forest Products Association). One non-profit environmental is the Canadian Renewable Fuels Association (CFRA), an organization committed to the promotion of products and energy made from renewable resources such as ethanol, bio-diesel, and other various bio-fuels. The CFRA regularly works with federal and provincial governments in Canada to help achieve GHG reduction targets as well as to attract investment towards the renewable energy industry. Another example of non-profit groups involved in policy consultations is the International Institute for Sustainable Development: this collective body is committed to promoting sustainable development by conducting policy research as well by interacting with NGOs, governments, and private corporations to develop sustainable environmental policies. (Note: Various other examples of such type of groups include Greenpeace Canada, The David Suzuki Foundation, Canadian Wildlife Federation, and Environmental Defence Canada.) Governments also recognize influential interest groups that maintain input in the consultation phase of policy-making. The Federation of Canadian Municipalities acts as a voice for municipal/local governments nationwide. The group advocates on behalf of the needs of all Canadian citizens.

=== Indigenous efforts ===
First Nations communities throughout Canada play an integral part in the renewable energy market. With respect to renewable energy initiatives, they are in support of policies and plans that reduce environmental degradation. Indigenous communities argue that they are neither consulted nor briefed during the planning of projects causing an inequitable relationship between project developers, the government, and the First Nations in the region.

In a report about renewable energy in Canada, with a principal focus on Aboriginal and environmental issues, the emerging problem discussed was the inherent gridlock in the energy development sector. Gridlock occurs because projects fail to recognise the infringement of property rights in First Nations traditional territories (Note: The Calder vs British Columbia case-1973- giving indigenous members of Canada Inextinguishable Property Rights.) There is an absence of trust between the parties, concerns over environmental degradation, and insufficient shared visions to create a mutually beneficial project. However, certain Indigenous communities own renewable energy projects on their land. Indigenous ownership of these projects was found to be correlated with higher community wellbeing. Aboriginal rights, such as hunting and fishing, remain protected under the Constitution of Canada.

Renewable energy initiatives are deployed throughout Indigenous communities: Whitesand First Nation, which is a community north of Thunder Bay, Ontario is not integrated within the provincial electrical grid. This is one of the twenty-five communities in Northern Ontario that are solely reliant on diesel fuel. These communities face many challenges, such as blackouts, diesel spills, and the volatile costs of transporting fuel (often by means of ice roads or by air). With diesel generators constantly running throughout winter, Ontario has been working on means to expand the electrical grid. After long delays, Whitesand First Nation with the coordination of the province has been developing a new renewable power station in this community. The energy plant develops organic wood pellets to heat and power biomass locations and facilities.

Renewable energy development can also be seen at the Cat Lake First Nations, where this Indigenous community has signed an agreement to install solar power that would generate 40 MW (which would power an estimated 6,650 homes). In this agreement, the First Nations own 51 percent of the company while the rest is owned by a mining company (AurCrest). Many scholars believe indigenous communities play a significant role within the energy market, and they need to be consulted to ensure a good relationship is created between private corporations and the government. As renewable energy becomes more prevalent, the cheaper cost of implementing (and manufacturing) energy such as solar power, wind power, geothermal power, and bio-energy will result in a more competitive renewable energy market.

== See also ==
- Energy policy of Canada
- Feed-in tariff program in Canada
- Green Energy Act 2009
- Solar power in Canada
- Wind power in Canada
- Geothermal power in Canada
- Hydroelectric power in Canada
- Renewable energy by country
