= Green Energy Act, 2009 =

Ontario, Canada statute

The Green Energy Act (French: Loi de 2009 sur l'énergie verte, GEA), enacted by the Green Energy and Green Economy Act, 2009, introduced in the Ontario legislature on February 23, 2009, and later repealed on January 1, 2019, was intended to expand renewable energy production, encourage energy conservation and create green jobs. Among many clauses, the GEA was best known for creating a number of feed-in tariff rates for different types of energy sources. Notable among these is the microFIT program for small non-commercial systems under 10 kilowatts, and FIT, the larger commercial version which covers a number of project types with sizes into the megawatts.

The GEA was a highly controversial piece of legislation within Ontario, in part due to the high initial tariff, up to 80.2 cents/kWh for small systems under microFIT. It was also viewed as controversial by stakeholders outside Ontario due to its "made in Ontario" clauses which demanded a certain amount of Ontario labor and manufacturing input in order to receive the tariff rates. Changes to the program and rates, some of them applied retroactively, added confusion and sparked complaints about the way the program was being managed. The GEA became a major topic of political discourse within Ontario and was heavily debated during the 2011 Ontario general election; the PC party threatened to cancel the act outright if elected, while the Liberals actively supported the GEA as a primary plank of their re-election platform.

== History ==
=== Previous efforts ===
Prior to the introduction of the GEA, Ontario had enacted a number of different programs to introduce renewable energy or promote conservation. These included the Energy Conservation Leadership Act, the Energy Efficiency Act and of particular note, November 2006's Renewable Energy Standard Offer Program. The Standard Offer, also known as SOP or RESOP for short, introduced a number of fixed 20-year feed-in tariffs for hydro, wind, solar (PV) and biomass projects. RESOP tariffs were relatively low, 42 cents/kWh for PV and 11 cents/kWh for other forms of energy. At the time, RESOP was named North America's first true feed-in tariff program.

In practice, it was found that the RESOP program had a significant administrative overhead that eroded the value of the program. In order to connect a generation project, the provider had to not only meet expected requirements for the equipment, but also had to apply to various agencies and levels of government for permission to connect to the grid. This process was not streamlined, and often required hundreds of pages of documentation to be submitted to each organization, in the proper sequence. Certain areas of the Ontario distribution grid were also placed off-limits for development, due to load considerations. Even then, there were stakeholders at the municipal level that could block development at any time as part of local building codes.

Due to the presence of fixed costs, including the administrative overhead, RESOP favoured large projects which could distribute these costs. It proved particularly successful for wind power developments, with almost 64% of the RESOP developments being wind, 28% biomass, and the rest a mix of hydro and a tiny amount of solar.

=== Towards the GEA ===
RESOP included a built-in two-year review process that started in 2008. During this period, the worldwide industry was also exploring a number of different ways to implement incentive programs. The main contenders were the feed-in tariff system, like RESOP, and emissions-trading systems like the UK's Renewable Obligation or New Jersey's Solar Renewable Energy Certificate. In 2008, Ernst & Young published Renewable energy country attractiveness indices for the first quarter of 2008, which demonstrated that Germany's FIT program was far more successful, delivering more power at lower costs. An earlier report from UC Berkeley demonstrated that job creation with renewables was far higher than fossil fuels, another argument in favour of the German-style program, which was then considered a great success.

With the success of FIT programs, and in response to RESOP issues, a number of stakeholders suggested an expansion of the program with higher rates and various changes to the connection process to simplify the workload. In particular, a number of proposals suggested adding additional classes for very small systems that would have minimal impact on the grid that could be given an express application process and pre-authorized access to connect. These systems would also be given much higher tariffs, in order to offset basic implementation details, like metering, that are often a fixed cost no matter the project size.

=== Introduction ===
The GEA effort was led by George Smitherman, the Minister of Energy and Infrastructure. It was claimed that the bill would help the government ensure the province's future by:

- Supporting and expanding economic investment, thus building a stronger, greener economy with an estimated 50,000+ direct and indirect jobs over the next three years
- Expanding Ontario's use of clean and renewable sources of energy such as wind, solar, biomass and biogas
- Better protecting the environment, combating climate change and creating a healthier future for generations to come.

== Features ==
Among the key features of the Act were the following:

- Different levels of tariff were set for electricity from various renewable sources (solar photovoltaic, biogas, biomass, landfill gas, on-shore and offshore wind and water power) "feed in" to the electrical grid; these are known as "Feed in Tariffs", and were based on similar tariffs implemented in Europe
- In order to qualify for the program, minimum levels of Ontario content were required in materials and labour
- Local electrical distribution companies (LDCs) were obligated to accept small generators into their systems, and given a set of standard regulations for systems under 10 kW (microFIT systems), and a variety of other sizes depending on the technology involved
- Smaller systems, and in particular microFIT systems, were guaranteed a simpler application procedure and faster turn-around time.
- The contract for payment of tariffs is for 20 years (40 years in the case of hydro generators), and was with the Ontario Power Authority, providing small generators with protection against changes in government policies

Several non-profit organizations were active in supporting the implementation of the Green Energy Act with customized wikis to assist consumers and service providers, including SWITCH and OurPower (see Further Reading).

== MicroFIT ==
MicroFIT is a renewable energy microgeneration program (less than 10 kW) in the province of Ontario, launched in October 2009 following the Green Energy Act, alongside feed-in tariff (FIT) to provide incentives for landowners to generate wind, solar, hydroelectric or other clean energy to sell to the electrical grid. Most applications for microFIT generation have been for solar energy.

By December 16, 2009, microFIT issued its first 700 contracts.

=== Benefits ===
Many solar photovoltaic companies have become involved in microFIT installations; the solar panels are also suitable for schools and places of worship. The projects benefit home, farm or business owners by revenue generation, reduce greenhouse gas emissions, and approved applicants are guaranteed to receive revenue for twenty years. The Green Energy Act aims to create 50,000 new green-collar jobs by 2012.

According to the Ontario Power Authority, homeowners generating electricity receive a following share of contract price per kilowatt-hour:

Renewable Fuel	Price ($/kWh)					
Renewable Fuel	Inception	April 5, 2012	August 26, 2013	September 30, 2014	June 21, 2016	January 1, 2017
Solar (PV) (rooftop)	$0.802	$0.549	$0.396	$0.384	$0.313 (< 6 kW) $0.294 (> 6 kW < 10 kW)	$0.313 (< 6 kW) $0.288 (> 6 kW < 10 kW)
Solar (PV) (non-rooftop)	$0.642	$0.445	$0.291	$0.289	$0.214	$0.210
On-shore wind	$0.135	$0.115		$0.128	$0.128	$0.125
Waterpower	$0.131		$0.148	$0.246	$0.246	$0.241
Renewable biomass	$0.138		$0.156	$0.175	$0.175	$0.172
Biogas	$0.160		$0.164	$0.168	$0.168	$0.165
Landfill gas	$0.111		$0.077	$0.171	$0.171	$0.168

=== Problems and challenges ===
Installation costs often exceed CA$50,000 and only about 9,000 projects have connected to the grid by late 2011 out of over 42,000 applicants. Concerns over islanding, lack of capacity and other problems have resulted in delays for many homeowners in installation, as connection points in some places have not been implemented. Cuts to pay rates generated further controversy.

== Effect on electricity price ==
The signing of the GEA corresponded with a dramatic increase in the Provincial Adjustment (now called the Global Adjustment). This is the cost added to the market price of electricity in Ontario. The Global Adjustment is made up of several different cost buckets, but the biggest one is guaranteed energy rates for generators. This is the difference between the rates that were guaranteed to generators by the provincial government, and the wholesale electricity rate which they are paid each month. In recent years, the wholesale rate has ranged between 1 and 3 cents per kWh. However, a June 2012 report by Bridgepoint Group Ltd. claimed most of this cost increase has been coincidental, rather than attributable to the fixed price for renewable energy. Likewise, the Ontario Energy Board claimed in April 2012 that the highest generator of the increased cost of electricity is guaranteed payments to nuclear generators, followed, by gas, coal, and hydro generation. In March 2011, the Ontario Government claimed that the combined cost of new renewable and conservation measures had been shown to account for only about 3% of total electricity cost in Ontario, although it was acknowledged that amount will rise as more green energy comes on line in future years.

== Controversy ==
Although the Green Energy Act promised to create 50,000 jobs, the Liberals admitted in 2013 that the Act had only created 31,000 jobs. Critics charge that even confirming this number is problematic because the large majority are "indirect" as opposed to "direct" employment. However, a 2011 report by Jim McCarter, Ontario's Auditor General, found that a large majority of these jobs were in construction and would only exist for no more than three years. In addition, McCarter's report also cited controversial reports from other countries which indicate "that for each job created through renewable energy programs, about two to four jobs are often lost in other sectors of the economy because of higher electricity prices" which has led critics to charge that the Green Energy Act has actually resulted in a net loss of employment.

A 2013 study by the conservative Fraser Institute stated that "wind power tends to be produced at times when it is least needed", and stated that:

Eighty percent of Ontario’s generation of electricity from wind power occurs at times and seasons so far out of phase with demand that the entire output is surplus and is exported at a substantial loss ... The Auditor-General of Ontario estimates that the province has already lost close to $2-billion on such exports.

The price of exports is determined by allowing electricity producers to bid on export offers at the price at which they are willing to produce it.

The quality of the "green" manufacturing jobs created in Ontario has also been questioned. Writing in the National Post, John Ivison noted in 2011 that Eclipsall Energy Corp, a newly created company in Scarborough, Ontario, that was touted by Premier Dalton McGuinty, only pays its workers 20% above minimum wage and that its manufacturing facility simply "assemble[s] glass and solar cells imported from Asia" (which allows it to qualify for the local content rules).

== Recent developments ==
In May 2013, Ontario Energy Minister Bob Chiarelli announced that the made-in-Ontario content requirements for wind and solar projects would be scrapped, after the World Trade Organization (WTO) ruled that they were a violation of WTO regulations.

In June 2013, Chiarelli announced that the province's future Feed-in-Tariff contacts will now be limited to smaller projects (less than 500 kW) and that a cap of 900 MW of additional capacity will be set for deployment by 2018. For larger projects, a competitive bidding system will be created, although projects that have already been contracted will not be affected by these changes.

In December 2013, Chiarelli announced that the remaining local content requirements which had already been reduced would be removed entirely sometime in 2014 in order to comply with the WTO decision. As a result, concerns have been expressed that this will lead to the loss of "green" manufacturing jobs in Ontario. In February 2014, Jeff Garrah, CEO of Kingston's Economic Development Commission (KEDCO), cited the removal of the local content requirements as the reason for the bankruptcy of Centennial Global Technology Inc., which in November 2013 had been described as Canada's "leading national solar panel distributor". It was reported that the removal of the local content rules had effectively "pull[ed] the plug on local production". Describing the Green Energy Act as "an ongoing soap opera", Garrah stated that municipalities across Ontario have become dismayed with how its solar and wind power provisions have been implemented.

On January 1, 2019, Ontario repealed the Green Energy Act.

== See also ==
- Energy law
- Feed-in tariff program in Canada
- Niagara Tunnel Project, completed in March 2013
- Toronto Renewable Energy Co-operative
- WindShare is a for-profit wind power co-operative in Ontario
