= Geothermal power in Canada =

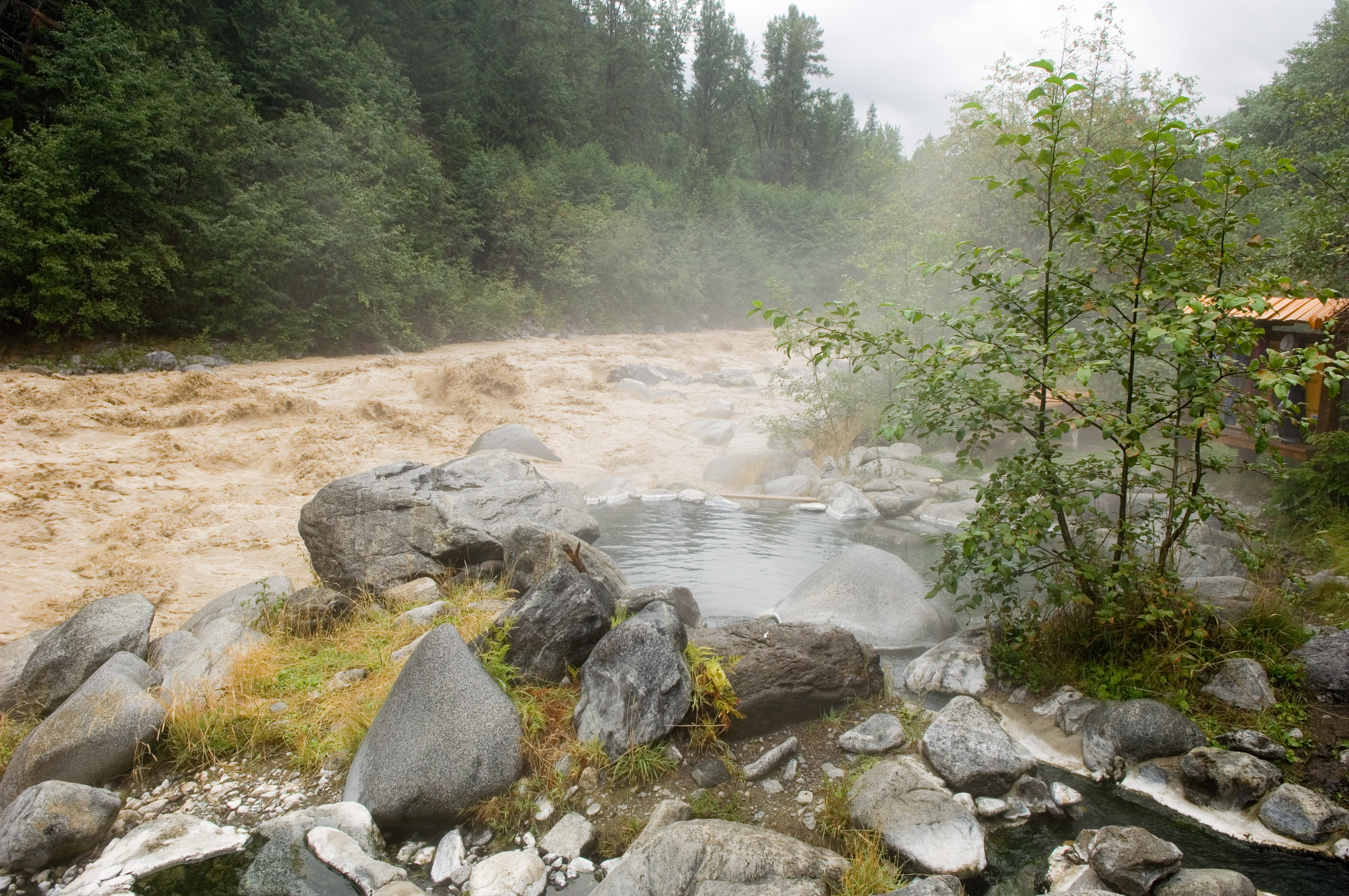
Meager Creek flowing next to a hot spring pool in Squamish-Lillooet, British Columbia.

Canada has substantial potential for geothermal energy development. To date, development has all been for heating applications. Canada has 103,523 direct use installations as of 2013. There is currently no electricity being generated from geothermal sources in Canada although substantial potential exists in the Canadian Cordillera. The most advanced project exists as a test geothermal-electrical site at the Mount Meager massif in British Columbia, where a 100 megawatt (MW) facility could be developed. Potential for enhanced geothermal energy systems (EGS) exists throughout Canada. There are six geothermal power and two direct use projects listed with the Canadian Geothermal Energy Association.

== Canadian geothermal resources in context ==
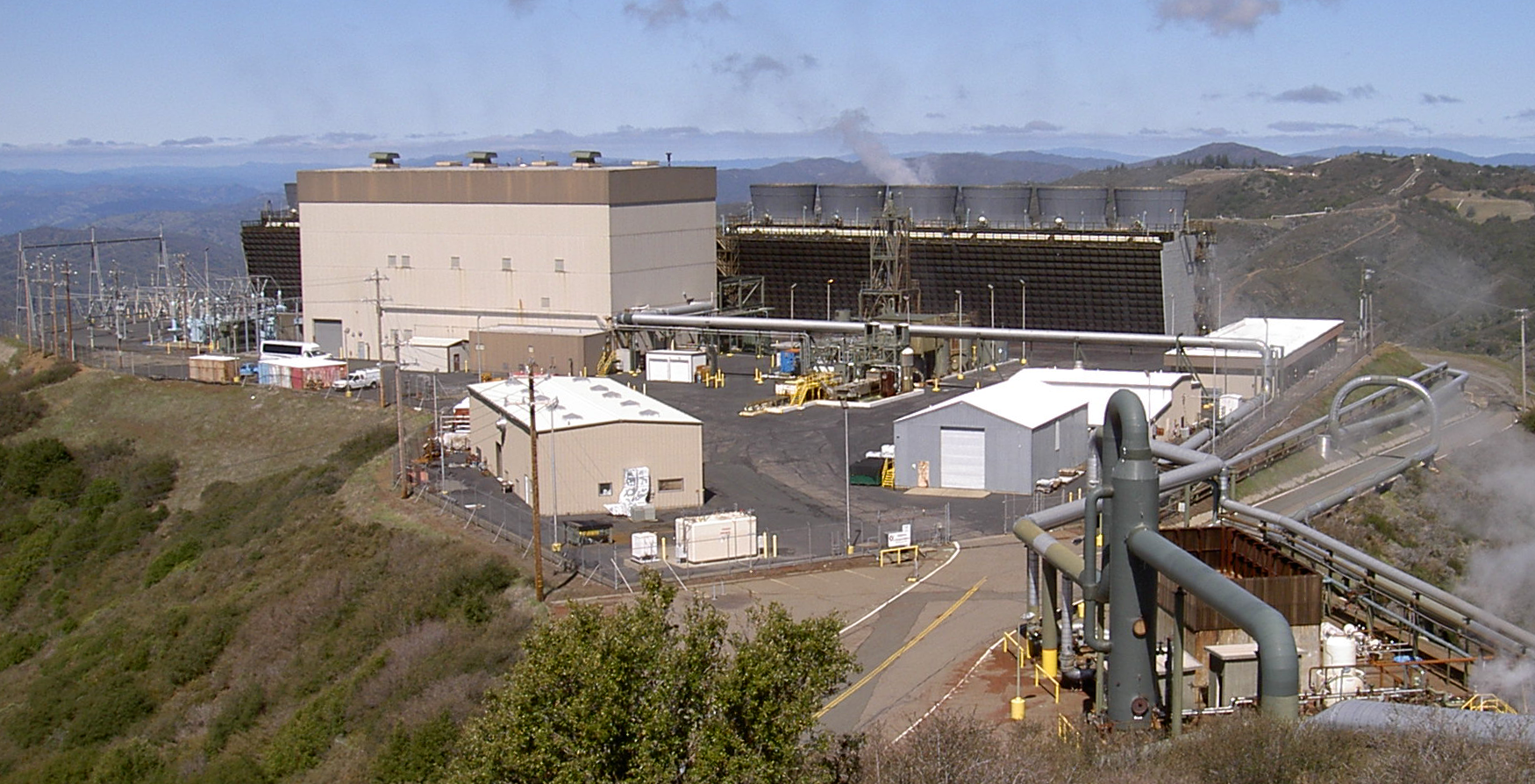
Sonoma Calpine 3 in California is an example of a geothermal power station.

The United States currently leads global development of geothermal power with 3,477 MWe of installed electrical power capacity, including 312 MWe added between 2010 and 2015. Whereas, Canada has 0 MW online, however, the geology conducive to geothermal development does not arbitrarily end at the Canada–United States border. Several states that share a border with Canada have significant geothermal capacity in development. It is estimated that Alaska has 95 MW in development, Idaho has 438–514 MW, Washington has 100 MW and even North Dakota has two small developments underway.

At present, Canada remains the only major country in the Pacific Rim that is not producing electricity from its geothermal resources. This is even though the colder it is outside, the more electricity a geothermal power plant can produce. This is because the larger the temperature differentials between the geothermal resource and the ambient air temperature, the more efficiently geothermal plants operate. This makes geothermal power ideal for cold northern countries.

== 2012 Geological Survey of Canada Report ==
In 2012, the Geological Survey of Canada issued a report entitled, the "Geothermal Energy Resource Potential of Canada (Open File 6914) ("The GSC Report"). The GSC Report concluded that "Canada’s in-place geothermal power exceeds one million times Canada’s current electrical consumption." Even if just a fraction of this energy can be used, it has the potential to significantly impact the Canadian electricity grid.

The GSC Report also notes that the now defunct National Geothermal Program (a Canadian government research program that ended in 1986) demonstrated that Canada has a geological environment favourable to geothermal development. This program defined high-temperature resources suitable for geothermal exploration and development, particularly in British Columbia, Yukon, and the Northwest Territories. Medium and low-temperature geothermal resources were also defined within sedimentary basins and abandoned mines throughout Canada. Pilot projects drilled at Meager Creek, British Columbia, and Regina, Saskatchewan further proved that geothermal power production in Canada is feasible. Now, 25 years since the program ended, advancements in technologies have further increased the economic potential of these geothermal resources.

=== Highest potential regions ===
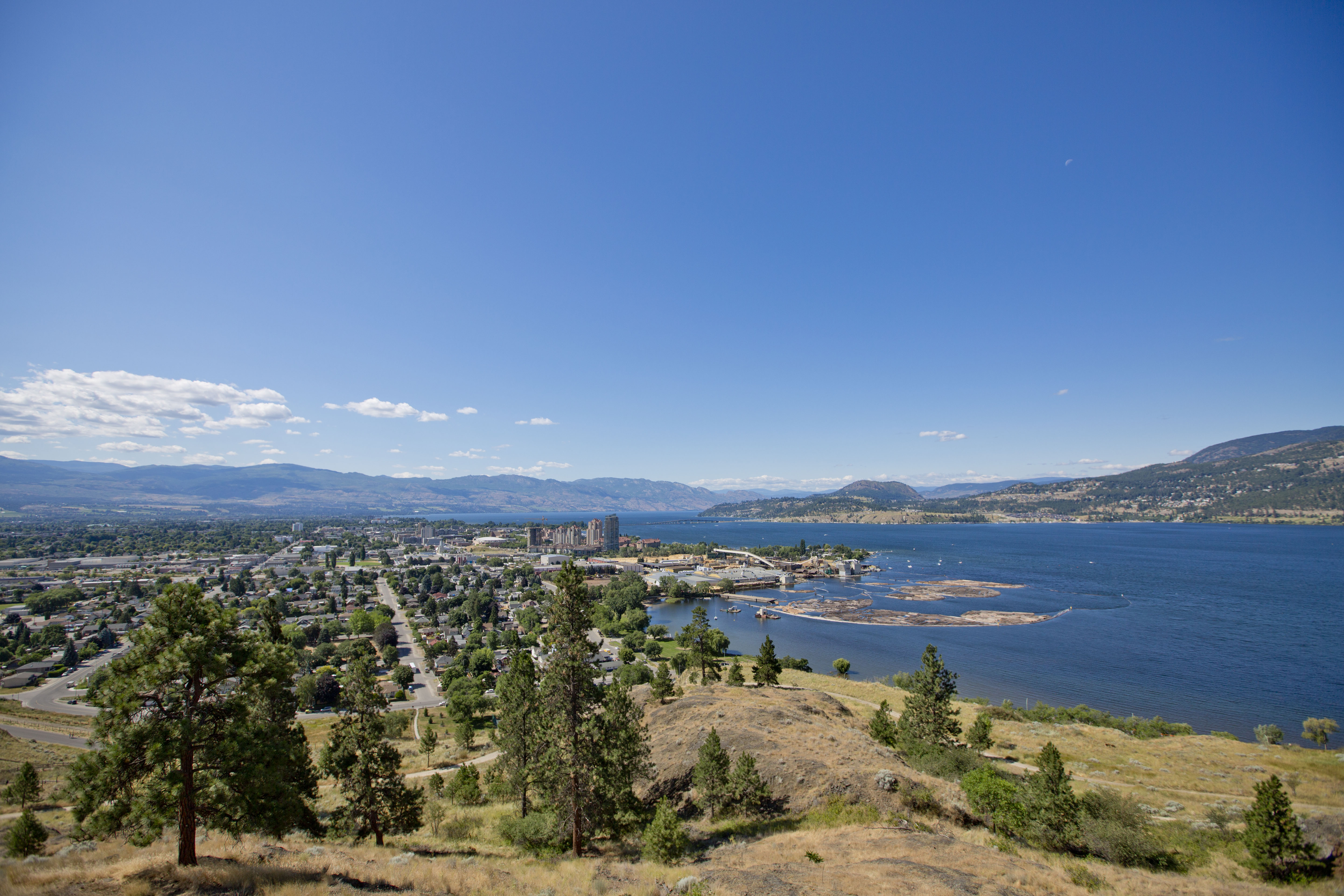
The Okanagan region of British Columbia is one of several regions throughout Canada with high potential for electrical power generation.

For utility-scale electrical generation using traditional dry steam and flash steam power stations, high temperature resources at reasonable drill depths are required. The study therefore defines regions at 150 °C (302 °F) that are at a depth of 5 kilometres (3.1 mi) or shallower as having high potential for high temperature geothermal systems such as electricity generation. Regions that meet such criteria include British Columbia, extreme northern Alberta, southeastern Yukon, and Northwest Territories.

For utility-scale electrical generation using binary cycle power stations, regions with hot springs and warm sedimentary basins with temperatures between 80 and 150 °C (176 and 302 °F) at reasonable drill depths are required. These regions include British Columbia, western and southern Alberta, southern Saskatchewan, Yukon, and Northwest Territories.

For geothermal heat pumps, regions with moderate and cool temperature sedimentary basins and/or fractured rock that can easily produce waters or be easy to drill shallow well systems for the installation of circulation loops, are required. These regions include British Columbia, Alberta, southern Saskatchewan, southern Manitoba, northern and southern Ontario, southern Quebec, New Brunswick, northern Nova Scotia, Prince Edward Island, Yukon, Northwest Territories, and Nunavut.

== Recent developments ==
=== Alberta ===
On 1 August 2019, Razor Energy - a Calgary-based oil and gas company - announced the development of a 21 MW hybrid geothermal and natural gas-fired power station in Swan Hills, Alberta. The project is expected to be operational by early 2020.

On 19 August 2019, the Government of Alberta announced that it had approved a 10 MW geothermal project near Rocky Mountain House called Eavor-Loop. Like the Borealis GeoPower project in British Columbia, Eavor-Loop will serve as a geothermal project pilot.

On 23 August 2019, the Government of Alberta approved the construction of a conventional 5 MW geothermal project near Greenview. The project is being led by Terrapin Geothermics in partnership with the Municipal District of Greenview and PCL Construction. The project is called the "Alberta No.1 Geothermal Project", a tribute to the discovery of oil at the Leduc No. 1 oil drilling site in 1947.

=== British Columbia ===
On 1 June 2018, the BC Oil and Gas Commission issued its first ever permit authorizing the construction of a geothermal energy project within the province. Borealis GeoPower plans to drill four geothermal wells near Valemount as a small geothermal project pilot.

On 28 January 2020, the Government of British Columbia awarded a permit to the Fort Nelson First Nation to develop a geothermal project for the Fort Nelson area called the "Clark Lake Geothermal Project".

As of 2021, Meager Creek Development Corporation holds the only geothermal lease in British Columbia for Mount Meager. The Meager Creek geothermal project is a renewable & clean energy opportunity. Rather than selling the power to the grid, it will be used to make green hydrogen.

=== Saskatchewan ===
On 14 January 2019, the Canadian government announced it will provide C$25.6 million in funding the development of a 5 MW geothermal power station near Estevan, Saskatchewan. The project is led by the Deep Earth Energy Production Corporation.

=== Yukon ===
On 29 January 2020, Eavor Technologies and the Little Salmon Carmacks First Nation entered into a partnership to develop a 3 MW closed-loop geothermal system the company calls an "Eavor-Loop" near Little Salmon Carmacks, Yukon.

== See also ==
- Renewable energy in Canada
- Wind power in Canada
- Solar power in Canada
- Hydroelectric power in Canada
- Renewable energy by country
