= ExPlace Wind Turbine =

Wind turbine in Toronto, Ontario, Canada

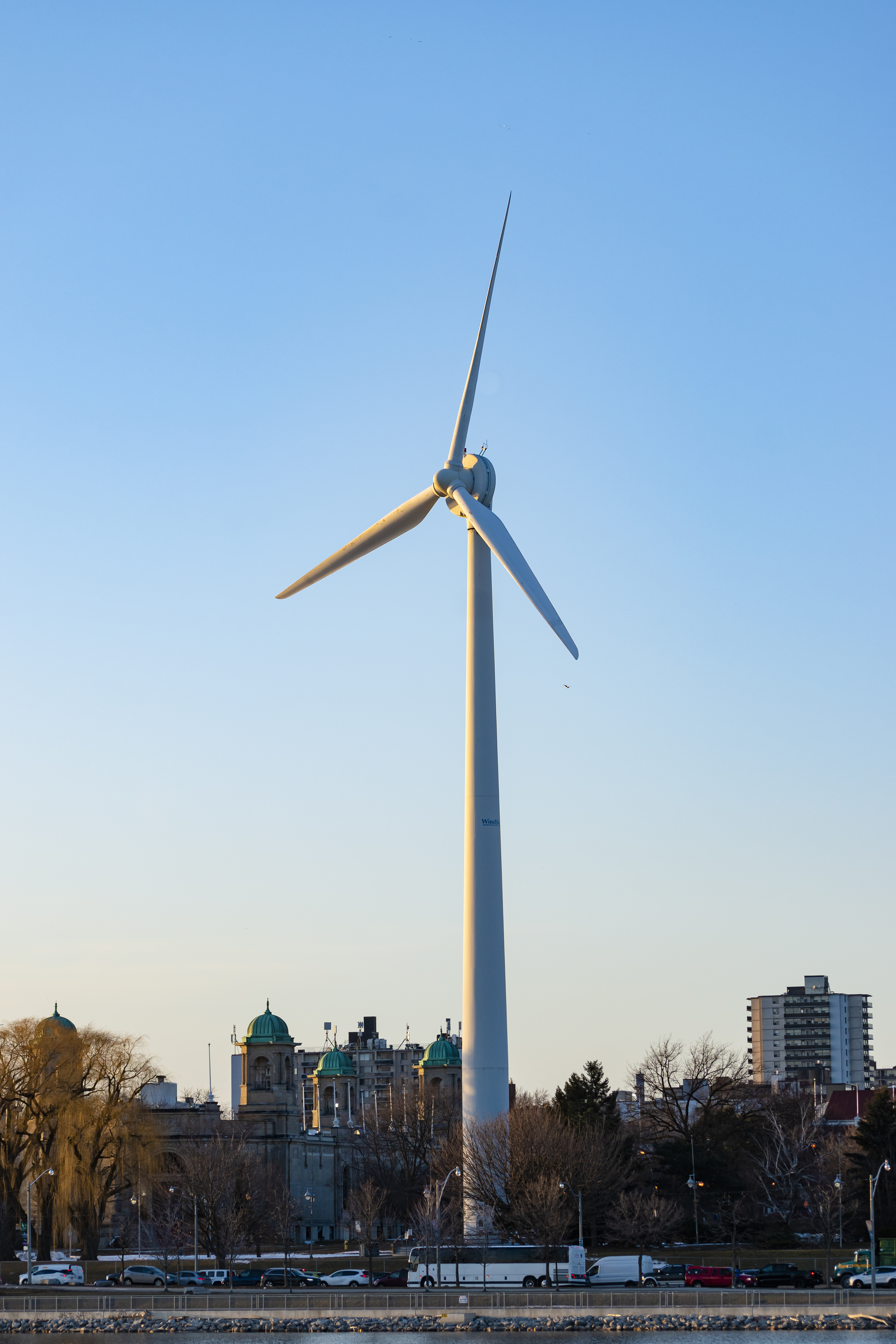
- The Toronto WindShare ExPlace turbine viewed from Ontario Place
- Country: Canada
- Location: Exhibition Place, Toronto, Ontario, Canada
- Coordinates: 43°37′49.5″N 79°25′29.3″W
- Status: Commissioned
- Construction began: December 16, 2002
- Commission date: January 23, 2003
- Construction cost: CA$1.8 million
- Owners: WindShare; Rankin Integrated Energy

Wind farm
- Type: Onshore
- Hub height: 65 m (213 ft)
- Rotor diameter: 52 m (171 ft)

Power generation
- Units operational: 1
- Make and model: Lagerwey Wind LW 52
- Annual net output: 1,000 MWh (3,600 GJ)

External links
- Website: windshare.ca
- Commons: Related media on Commons

The ExPlace Wind Turbine is a 91 m (299 ft) tall wind turbine located in Toronto, Ontario, Canada, on the grounds of the Exhibition Place (a.k.a. ExPlace). The turbine is co-owned by WindShare, a for-profit co-operative; and Rankin Integrated Energy (part of Rankin Construction), a construction company specializing in renewable projects. It is the first wind turbine installed in a major North American urban city centre and the first community-owned wind power project in Ontario.

== History ==
In 1998, the Toronto Renewable Energy Co-operative (TREC) was incorporated. The next year, the TREC received a grant to study three potential sites for an urban wind turbine project in Toronto. On June 30, 1999, the TREC formed an ad hoc partnership with Toronto Hydro to build wind turbines in Toronto. In February 2002, the TREC officially launched the WindShare co-operative with the policy of asking members of the non-profit TREC to become members of the for-profit WindShare co-operative. WindShare itself was officially launched in February 2002 in Toronto. It was created by the non-profit Toronto Renewable Energy Co-operative (TREC) which was incorporated in 1998. TREC continues to exist as a separate non-profit entity.

From December 16 to 18, 2002, WindShare's wind turbine was erected. It is the first wind turbine installed in a major North American urban city centre,. and the first community-owned wind power project in Ontario. On January 23, 2003, the ExPlace turbine began generating electricity. In 2006, the Government of Ontario introduced a feed-in tariff. In 2009, as a part of the Green Energy Act, the feed-in tariff was revised by the Government of Ontario.

In the summer of 2012, the turbine was taken offline due to problems with the converter (the part of the turbine that converts the movement of its blades into electricity). The converter was replaced, and the turbine was brought back online in March 2013. In July 2014, however, the new converter had issues, resulting in the turbine being offline until October of the same year until the issues were resolved.

In March 2017, water damaged the wind turbine's ring generator during a storm, causing the wind turbine to stop operating. After five months, Toronto Hydro funded a specialist firm to begin the required repairs as well as other upgrades to the turbine with work originally expected to be completed by November of the same year. However, the turbine did not become operational again until February 2019, over a year later.

On November 4, 2022, Toronto Hydro Energy Services Inc. transferred its 55.1 percent share in the project to WindShare. Upon completing the transfer, WindShare created a joint partnership with Rankin Integrated Energy (part of Rankin Construction).

== Technical details ==
The turbine is 91-metre (299 ft) tall and is a 600 kW direct drive Lagerwey Wind LW 52 wind turbine that weighs approximately 121,000 kg (266,759 lb). The tower of the turbine is 65 m (213 ft) tall and the diameter of the rotor is 52 m (171 ft). The turbine has three blades that are each 25 m (82 ft) long. The rotor's normal rotation speed is approximately 24.5 rpm. The turbine is able to produce a power output of 500 kW in winds of 21 knots (39 km/h; 24 mph). Construction of the turbine cost approximately CAD$1.8 million (including foundation, interconnect, and erection).

The turbine adds an average of 1,000 MWh (3,600 GJ) of electricity to the city's main power grid per year.

== See also ==
- List of wind farms in Canada
- Community wind energy
- Ontario Sustainable Energy Association
