= Hydroelectricity in Canada =

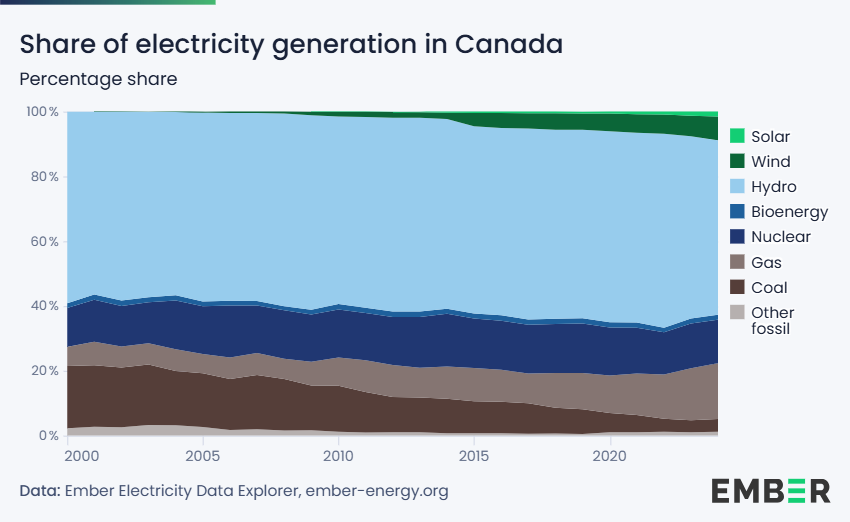
Electricity generation in Canada by source - percentage share

According to the International Hydropower Association, Canada is the fourth largest producer of hydroelectricity in the world in 2021 after China, Brazil, and the United States. In 2019, Canada produced 632.2 TWh of electricity with 60% of energy coming from Hydroelectric and Tidal Energy Sources).

Some provinces and territories, such as British Columbia, Manitoba, Newfoundland and Labrador, Quebec and Yukon produce over 90% of their electricity from Hydro. All of the dams with large reservoirs were completed before 1990. Since then, most development has been run-of-the-river, both large and small. Natural Resources Canada calculates the current installed small hydro capacity is 3,400 MW, with an estimated potential of 15,000 MW. In 2010, a report on the future of hydroelectricity assumed the remaining 40% potential may remain undeveloped up to 2050 because of lacking public acceptance.

As of 2021, Canada had 82,232 MW (about 82 GW) of installed hydroelectric capacity. By 2024, installed hydropower capacity had grown to about 84.3 GW, and hydroelectricity supplied over 60% of Canada's electricity. Hydroelectric generation totalled about 359 TWh in 2023, the lowest level since 2016, owing largely to drought in major hydro-producing provinces.

While hydroelectric power remains significant in Canada in the 2020s, in its early years it was one of the main drivers of Canadian industrialisation (→ Technological and industrial history of Canada#Energy and electricity). In 1938 over 98% of Canada's electricity was from hydropower, which alone put Canada ahead of France and Italy in total electricity production, and comparable to the entire United Kingdom, Imperial Japan, or Soviet Union. Only the United States and Germany had considerably more total electricity production at that time.

== By region ==
Installed hydroelectric capacity by province/territories in 2018
province/territory	installed capacity (MW)
Alberta	943
British Columbia	14,210
Manitoba	5,701
Newfoundland and Labrador	7,775.8
New Brunswick	950.1
Northwest Territories	56
Nova Scotia	365
Ontario	7,480
Prince Edward Island	0
Quebec	38,400
Saskatchewan	868
Yukon	95

=== British Columbia ===
BC Hydro owns and operates the majority of hydroelectric installations in British Columbia. A second crown corporation, Columbia Power Corporation and two companies also own large dams in BC, Alcan's Kemano Project and FortisBC.

90% of BC Hydro's generation is produced by hydroelectric means. Natural gas and biomass thermal power round out the generation portfolio.

Over 80% of BC Hydro's installed in generating capacity is at hydroelectric installations in the Peace and Columbia River basins. The GM Shrum and Peace Canyon generating stations are on the Peace River produced 29% of BC Hydro's electricity requirements. In the Columbia River Basin, Mica and Revelstoke hydroelectric plants together contributed 25%, while Kootenay Canal and Seven Mile generating stations together supplied 10%.

The remaining 25 hydroelectric generating stations supplied 14% of electricity production. BC Hydro also operates thermal power plants. The Burrard Thermal Generating Station contributes 7.5% and the remaining 14.5% of the electricity requirement was supplied by purchases and other transactions.

BC Hydro's last dam was completed in 2025. Power production without reservoirs varies dramatically through the year, so older dams with large reservoirs retain water and average out capacity. As of 2012, there were approximately 40 small hydro sites generating 750 MW. By 2014 various companies have built a total of 100 run of the river projects under 50 MW. In 2014 they produced 18,000 GWh from 4,500 MW of capacity.

==== Drought Conditions ====
Present drought conditions persist in BC Hydro hydrodam reservoirs, particularly in the south coast of the province. In a 2022 BC Hydro report titled "Casting Drought", it is noted that Campbell River on Vancouver Island has experienced its lowest water flow in 53 years. Despite these conditions, BC Hydro spokesperson Mora Scott states that preventative measures such as water conservation have been made in order to protect water flow and fish populations in vulnerable watersheds.

=== Manitoba Hydro ===
As of March 31, 2018, Manitoba Hydro serves a peak Manitoba electrical load of 5,648 megawatts. Electrical supply to Manitoba customers was 22.5 terawatt-hours in fiscal 2017, with total revenue due to electricity of $1.464 billion CAD. Extraprovincial sales totaled $437 million in 2017-18 and were at 9.448 terawatt-hours, with normal water flows. The company also delivered 2.048 billion cubic metres of natural gas in 2017–18, which contributed $346 million CAD to revenues. As of early 2020, around 97% of the electricity generation in Manitoba comes from hydroelectricity. The new Keeyask Station on the Nelson River was completed in 2021-2022.

=== Newfoundland and Labrador ===
Newfoundland and Labrador Hydro's installed generating capacity, 8,652 megawatts (MW), 92 percent hydroelectric, is the third largest of all utility companies in Canada. In December 2024, Newfoundland and Labrador Hydro and Hydro‑Québec signed an agreement in principle for the generation of hydroelectricity in Labrador. The agreement includes construction of a new 2,250 MW generating station at Gull Island by 2034, an extension of the existing Churchill Falls Generating Station to produce an additional 1,100 MW by 2035, and upgrades to the 11 turbine‑generator units with an added capacity of approximately 550 MW.

=== Northwest Territories ===
The Northwest Territories has an installed hydroelectric generating capacity of 55 MW, supplying electricity to the North Slave and South Slave electricity grids. Each grid operates independently and is not connected to the electrical grid in the rest of Canada.

=== Ontario ===
Ontario Power Generation (OPG) produces 50% of the electricity used in the province, 40% from hydroelectric, 10% from nuclear-powered facilities, 30% from solar, and 20% from biomass. OPG uses thermal plants that burn biomass and natural gas with a generating capacity of 2,458 MW; these plants were not used in 2015.

After a provincial government commitment to phase out all coal generating plants, two units at Nanticoke were shut down in fall 2010. Another two were shut down in 2011. The final four were shut down on December 31, 2013.

Most of Ontario's large hydroelectric sites were utilized in the early 20th century, which limits exenstive expansion from occurring within the province. Nonetheless, efforts by the Government of Canada in collaboration with hydropower entities to expand and maintain hydroelectric resources have been put in motion. This is partly driven by the fact that Ontario is forecasted to have a 60 TWh increase in net energy demand by 2043.

==== Possible expansion in Northern Ontario ====
Zig Zag Rapid on Little Jackfish River

Ontario's current hydroelectricity stations are mainly located in southern Ontario.

On January 26, 2022, Todd Smith, the Ontario Minister of Energy requested an analysis report from IESO in support of a voluntary clean energy credit registry for Ontario citizens. CECs are claimable credits that represent one megawatt hour of clean energy. According to the report requirements outlined in the letter, the registry would include credit offerings that based from existing, non-emitting generation such as nuclear, waterpower, wind, solar, and bioenergy.

On February 9, 2023, a report titled Made in Ontario Northern Hydroelectric Opportunities: Securing a Clean Energy Future Through Hydropower was published by Ontario Power Generation (OPG) in collaboration with the Ontario Waterpower Association. In response to Todd Smith's letter. The report claimed that the estimated hydroelectric potential in northern Ontario is 3000 to 4000 megawatts. The document also provided the following locations as possible sites for hydroelectric development.

Area	Number of Sites	Rivers	Low Scenario	High Scenario
Moose River Basin	9	Abitibi Mattagami Moose	640 MW	1,250 MW
Albany and Attawapiskat rivers	8	Albany Attawapiskat	680 MW	1,300 MW
Little Jackfish River	2	Little Jackfish	80 MW	105 MW
Severn River Basin	2	Severn Windigo	20 MW	35 MW

Little Jackfish River in particular had been an OPG ongoing project since 2011, but had been put on hold as energy demands at that time were insufficient. However, with forecasted new demands, the revival of the project may be considered feasible by the Government of Canada.

==== Opposition to Expansion ====
While the instalment of hydroelectric stations in northern Ontario could potentially meet rising energy demands, public concerns over the environmental damage caused by hydroelectric activities are present.

The Ontario River Alliance opposes the creation of new hydroelectric facilities in Ontario, insisting that labeling hydroelectric power as a non-emitting source for CRCs is misinformation and that dams do generate greenhouse gasses by the accumulation of methane producing biomass. This claim is based on a 2006 European study that correlates increased methane production of 7% to the accumulation of sedimentation behind hydraulic structures.

=== Quebec ===
Hydro-Québec's extensive network of 61 hydroelectric dams have a combined capacity of 38,400 megawatts, accounting for over half of the Canadian total. Hydropower accounts for 95.73% of the supply sold by the Quebec Crown-owned utility. Five of Hydro-Québec's hydroelectric facilities are rated above 2,000 MW — the Manic-5, La Grande-4, La Grande-3 La Grande-2-A and Robert-Bourassa stations — while 7 others have a capacity of over 1,000 megawatts.

== New projects ==
The proposed Gull Island facility would consist of a generation station with a capacity of 2,250 MW after 2035.

== International comparison ==
Population, area, water resources, and GDP for selected countries
	Population (thousands)	Area (km^{2})	Renewable freshwater resources				Total water withdrawal (km^{3}) per year	Gross Domestic Product (millions of $ U.S.)	Gross Domestic Product ($ U.S.) per capita
	Population (thousands)	Area (km^{2})	Volume (km^{3})		Volume (m^{3}) per capita	Volume (m^{3}) per unit area (m^{2})	Total water withdrawal (km^{3}) per year	Gross Domestic Product (millions of $ U.S.)	Gross Domestic Product ($ U.S.) per capita
Brazil	188,158	8,514,880	8,233	1	43,756	0.967	59.3	1,089,398	5,790
India	1,147,746	3,287,260	1,892	9	1,648	0.576	645.9	911,376	794
France	63,236	549,190	204	43	3,226	0.371	40.0	2,266,137	35,836
Canada	32,628	9,978,904	3,472	3	^{1}109,837	0.348	42.0	1,278,682	39,189
United States	305,697	9,632,030	3,051	4	9,980	0.317	473.6	13,116,500	42,907
China	1,297,847	9,598,090	2,830	6	2,181	0.295	630.4	2,779,871	2,142
Russian Federation	142,530	17,098,240	4,508	2	31,628	0.264	66.2	989,428	6,942
Mexico	106,411	1,964,380	457	25	4,295	0.233	78.2	945,644	8,887
Australia	20,628	7,741,220	492	21	23,851	0.064	23.9	787,418	38,172
South Africa	48,639	1,219,090	50	95	1,028	0.041	12.5	257,728	5,299

== Gallery ==
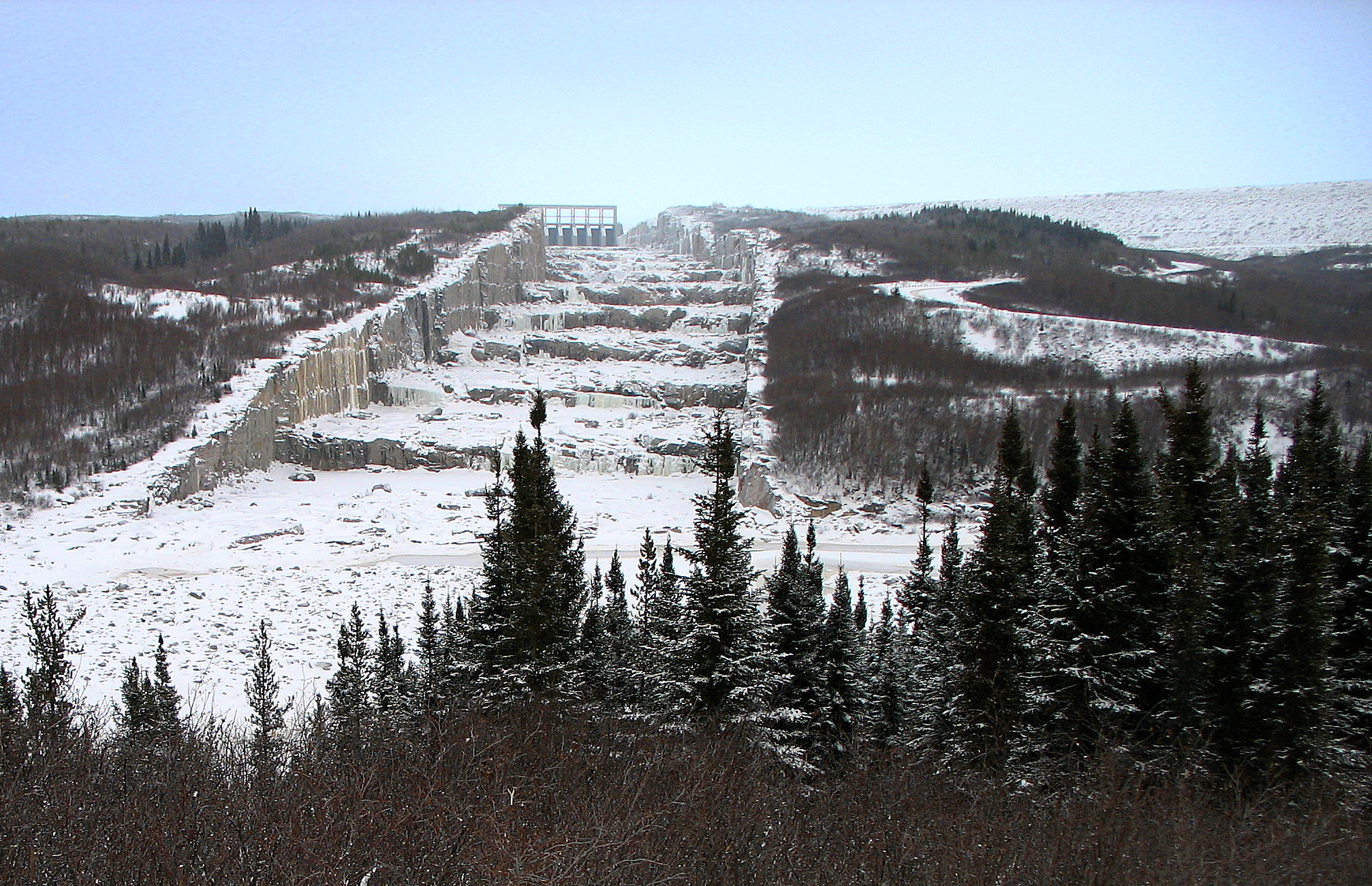
The Robert-Bourassa (LG-2) spillway, on Quebec's La Grande River.

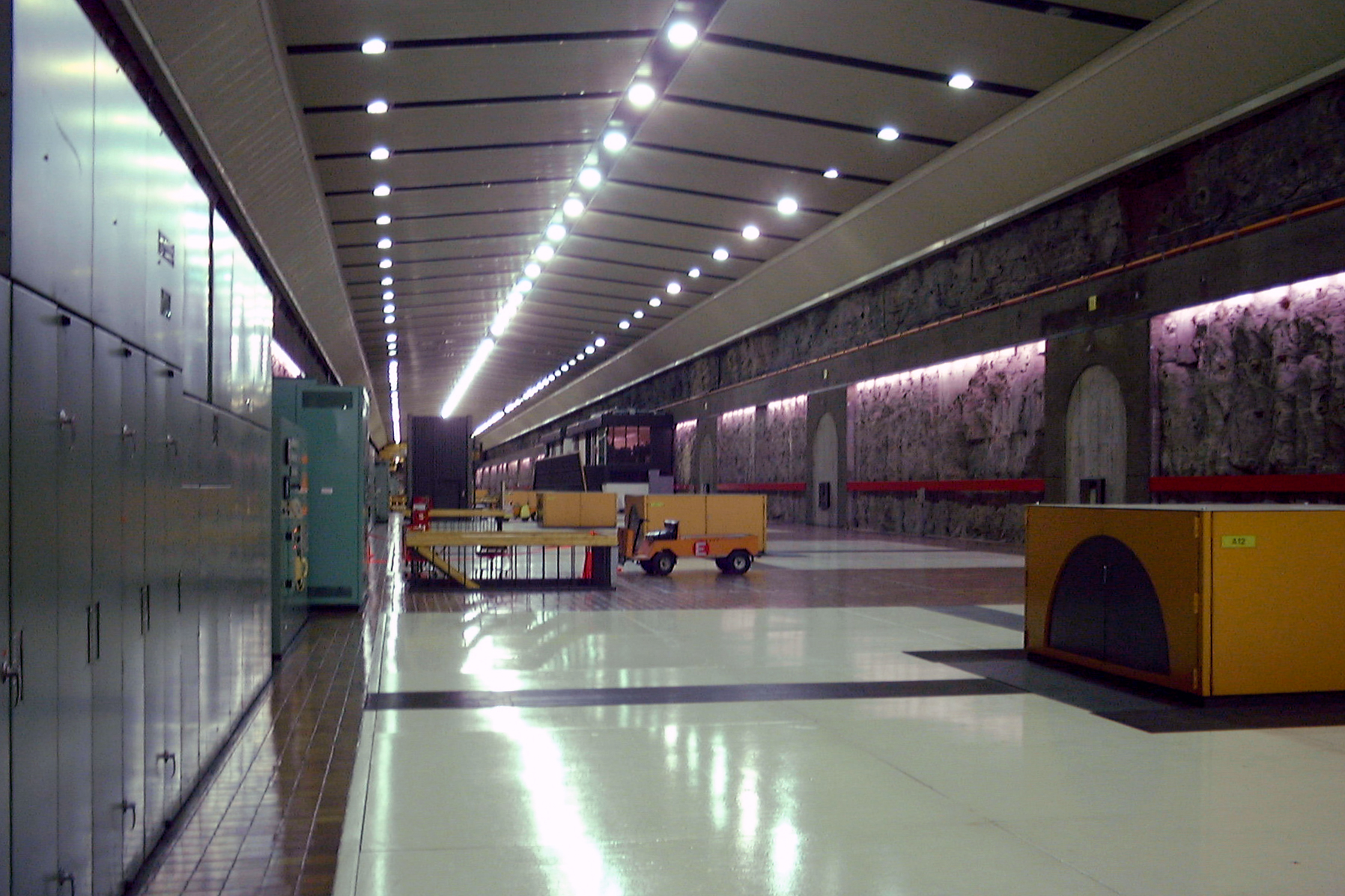
Inside the Robert-Bourassa generating station powerhouse, the largest in North America with an installed capacity of 5,616 MW.

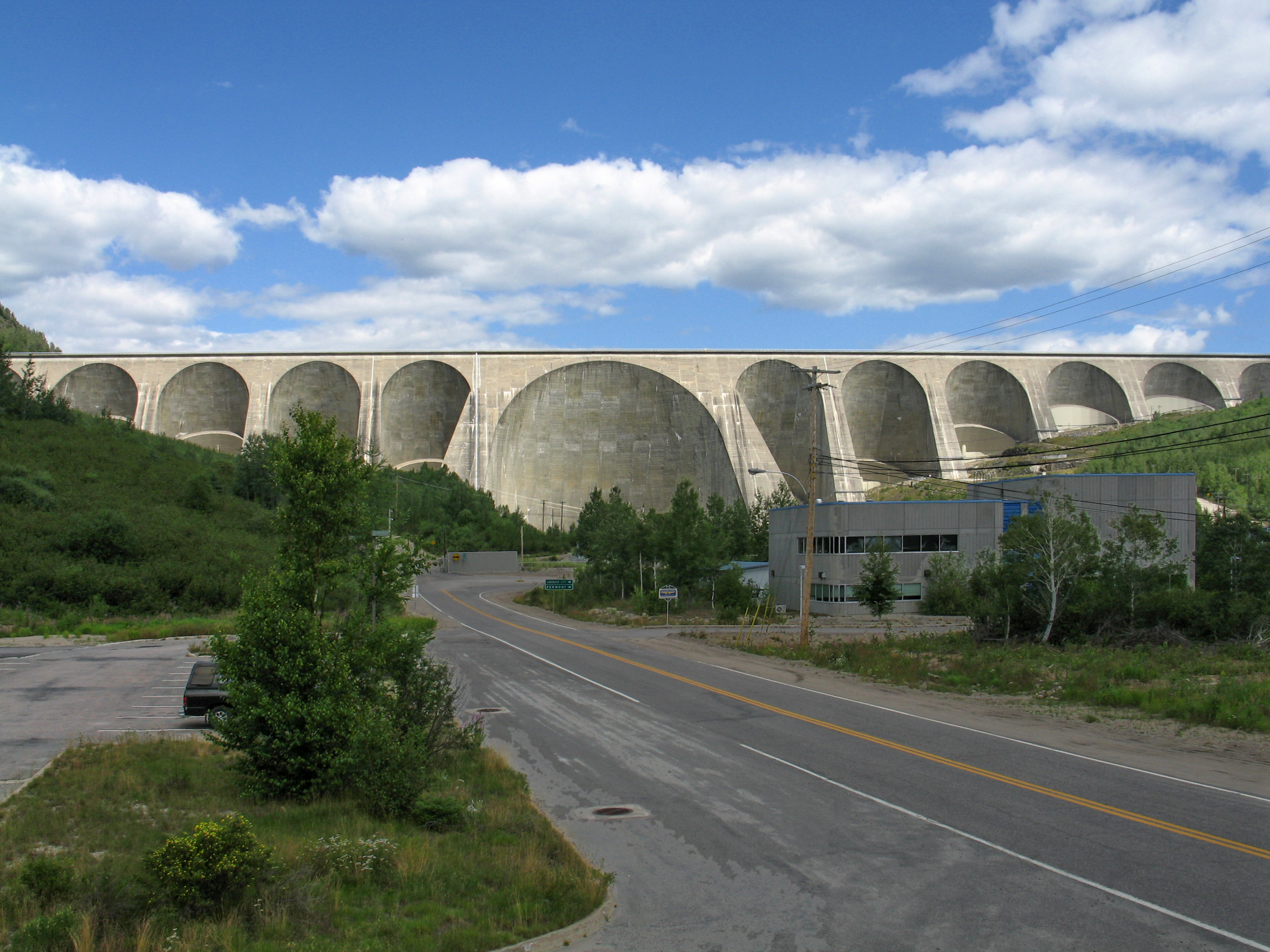
The Daniel-Johnson Dam, on Quebec's Manicouagan River (1968)

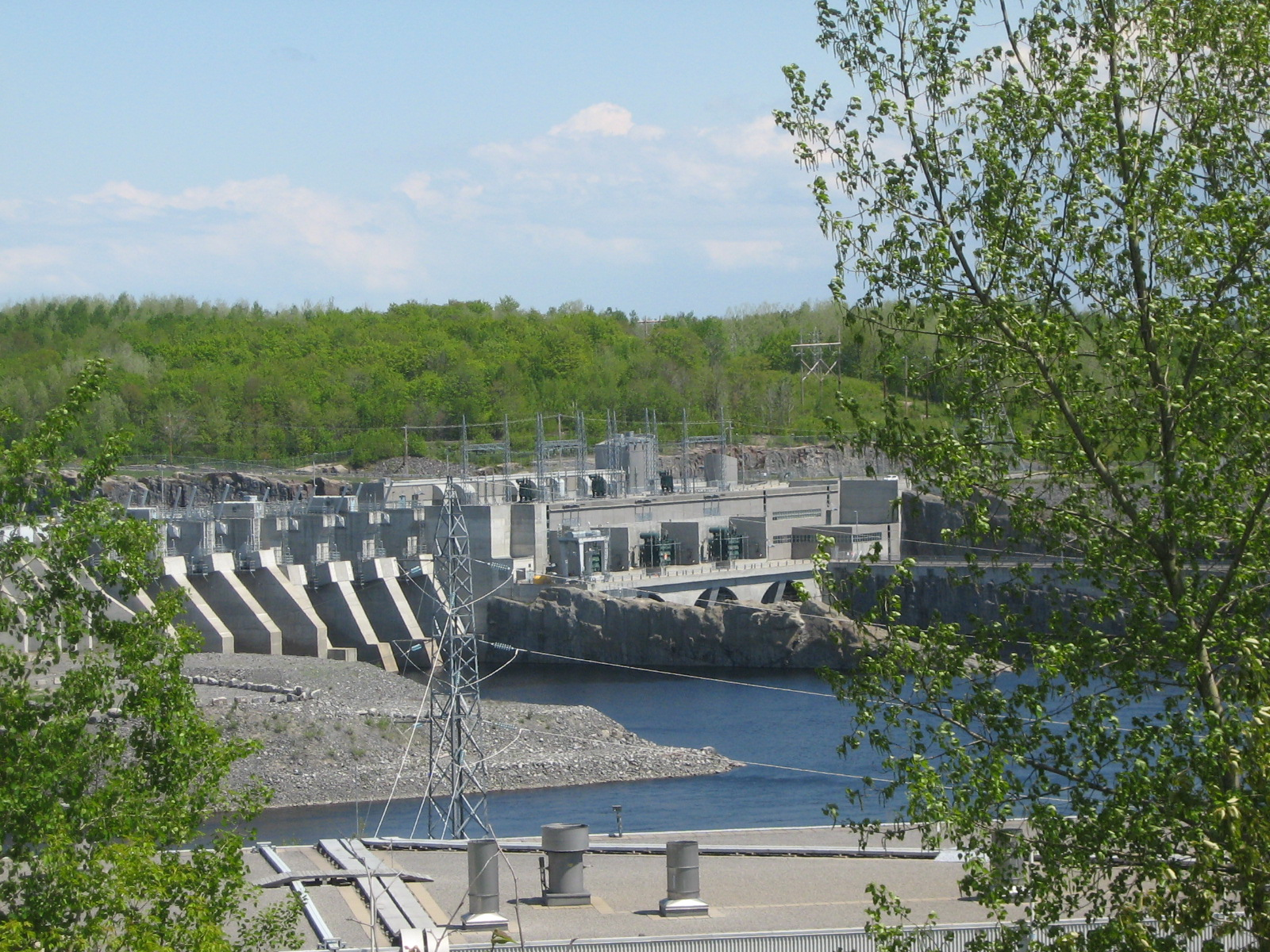
The 230-MW Rocher-de-Grand-Mère station, on Quebec's Saint-Maurice River (2004)

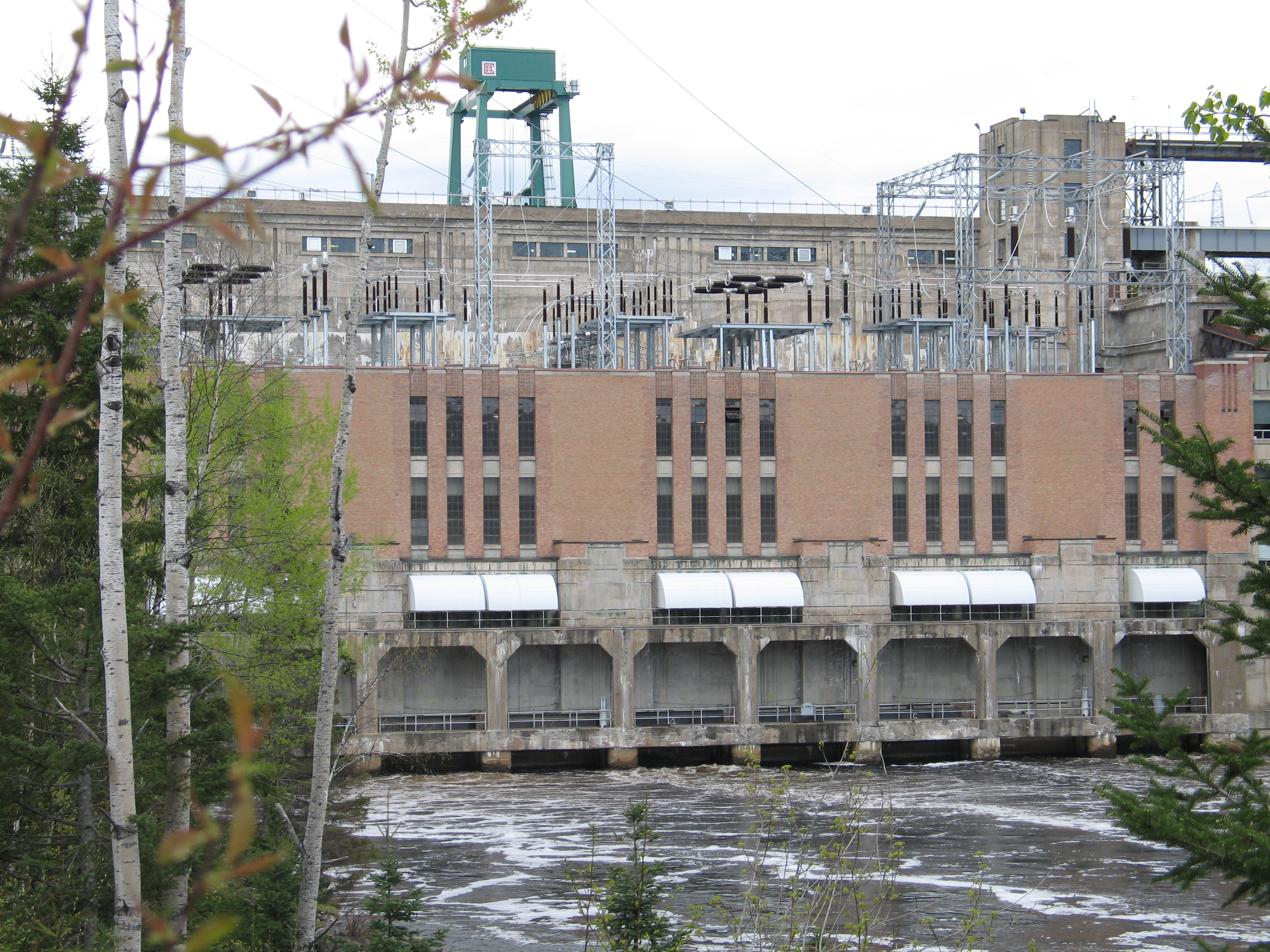
The 204-MW Rapide-Blanc generating station, on Quebec's Saint-Maurice River (1934)

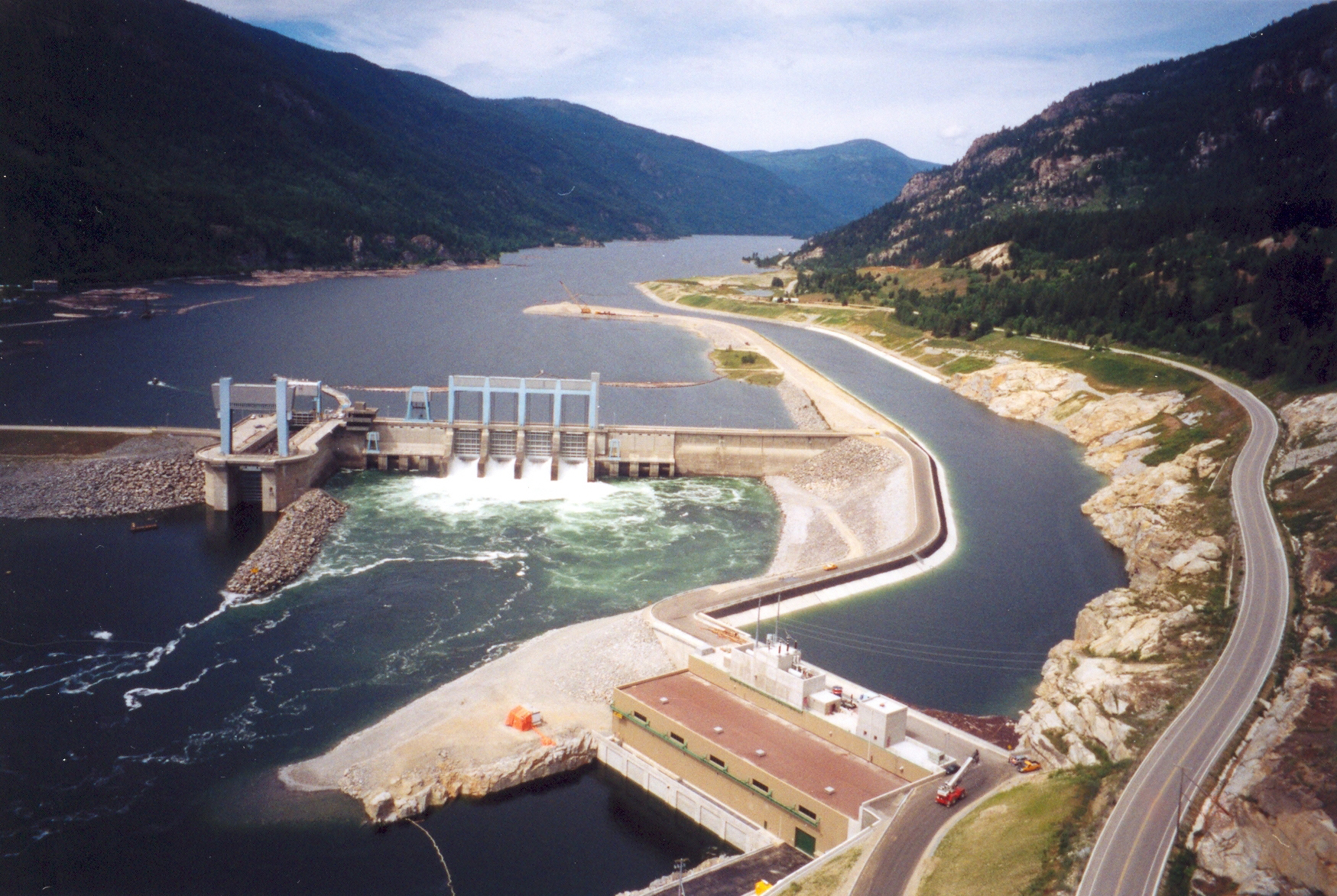
A hydroelectric dam on the Arrow Lakes in British Columbia.

== See also ==
- List of electrical generating stations in Canada
- Renewable energy in Canada
- Wind power in Canada
- Solar power in Canada
- Geothermal power in Canada
- Renewable energy by country
