= Arnprior Solar Generating Station =

MW solar farm

Arnprior Solar Project
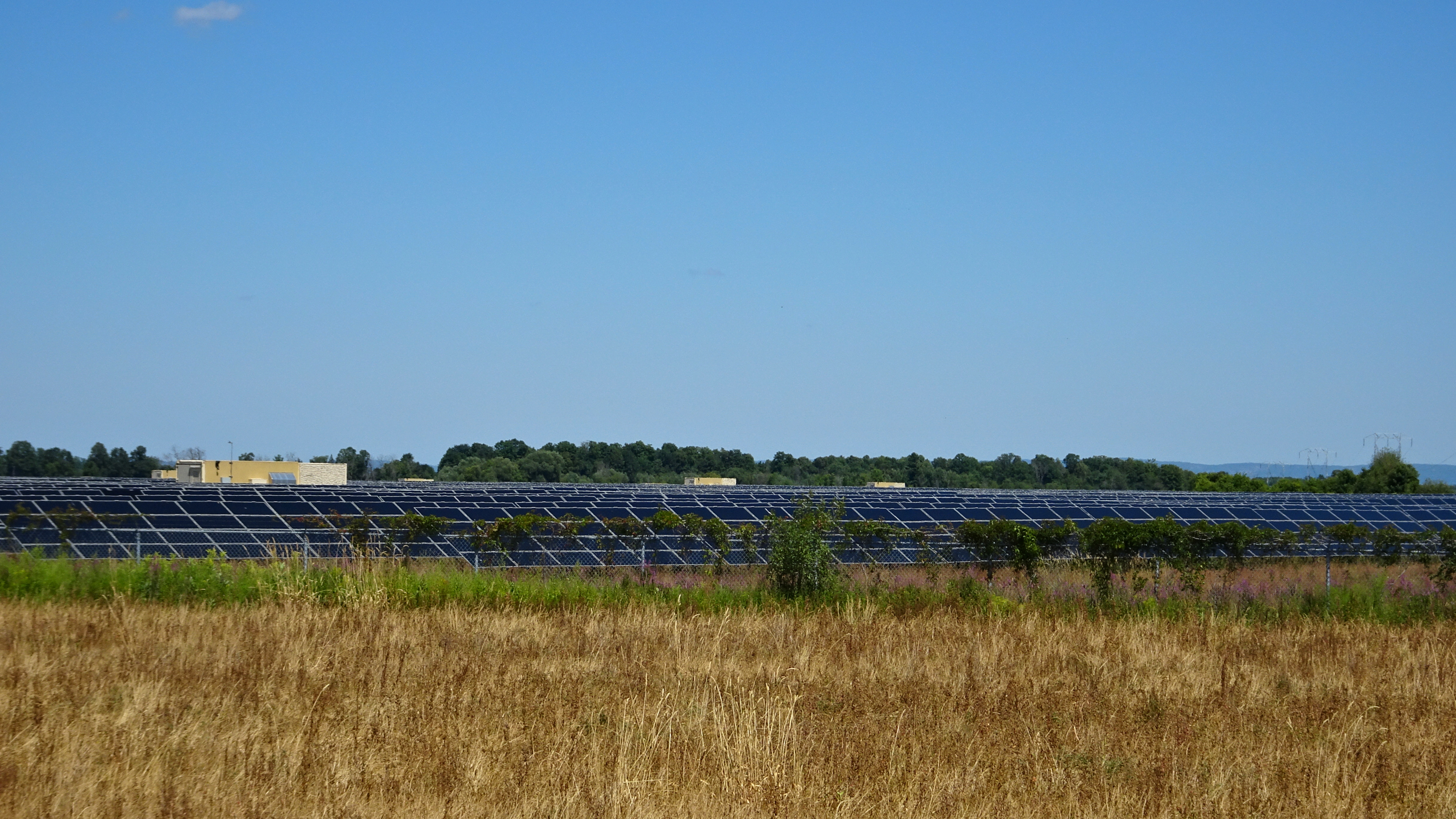
- Country: Canada
- Location: Ottawa
- Coordinates: 45°24′30″N 76°16′30″W
- Status: Operational

Solar farm
- Type: Standard PV

The Arnprior Solar Project is a 23.4 MW solar farm located near the town of near Arnprior, Ontario, Canada. It was developed and is owned by EDF EN Canada and is operated by EDF Renewable Services, both units of EDF Energies Nouvelles. Construction began in May 2009 and operation commenced in December 2009.

The project consists of 312,000 PV thin film solar panels made by First Solar and mounted on 13,000 fixed-tilt racks in a 200 acres (81 ha) field.

== See also ==
- Solar power in Canada
- Photovoltaic power stations
