= Solar power in Canada =

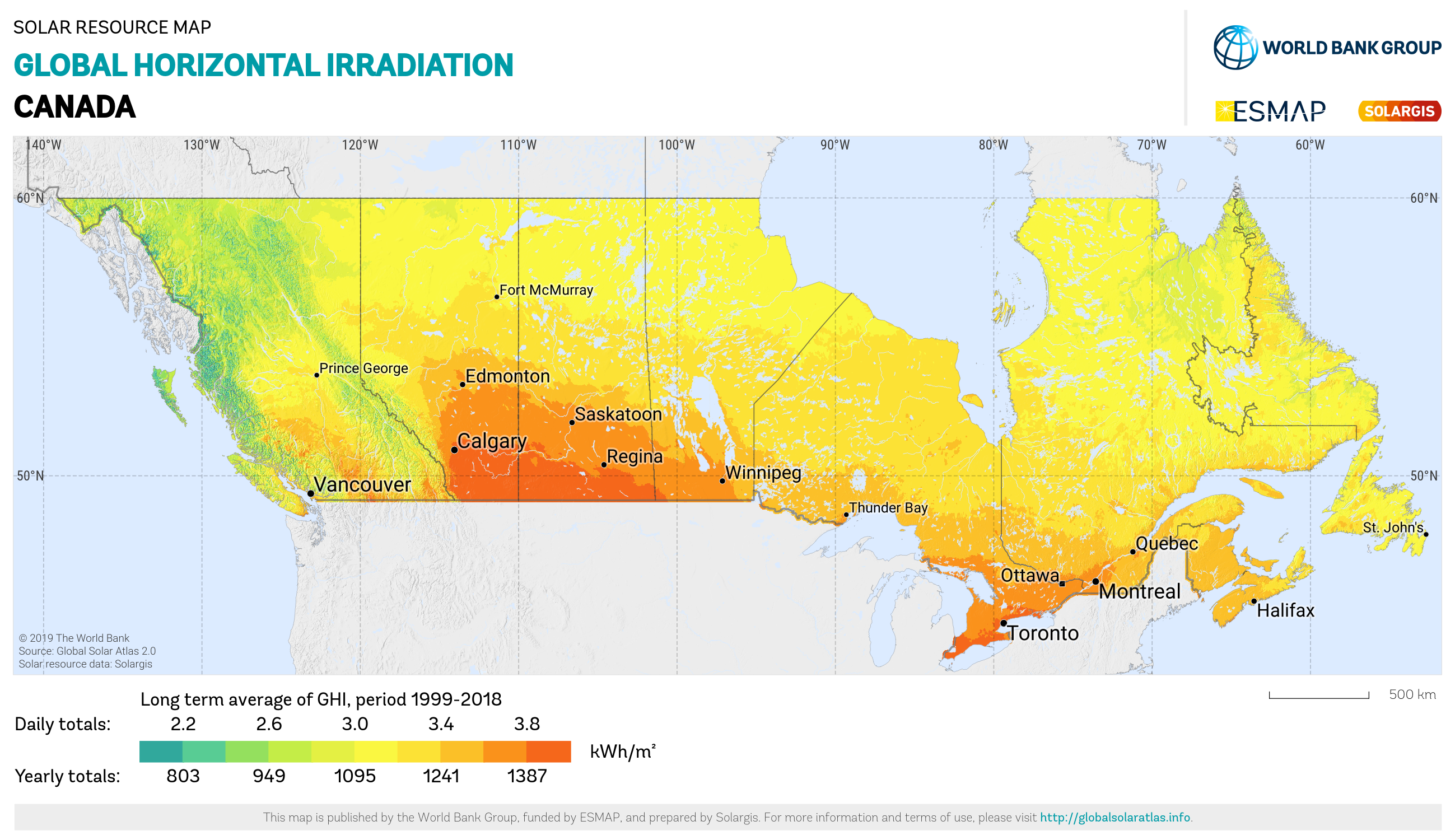
- Solar irradiation map of Canada
- Installed capacity: 6 GW (2024) (19th)
- Annual generation: 8 TWh (2024)
- Capacity per capita: 157 W (2024)
- Share of electricity: 1% (2024)

Historically, the main applications of solar energy technologies in Canada have been non-electric active solar system applications for space heating, water heating and drying crops and lumber. In 2001, there were more than 12,000 residential solar water heating systems and 300 commercial/industrial solar hot water systems in use. These systems presently comprise a small fraction of Canada's energy use, but some government studies suggest they could make up as much as five percent of the country's energy needs by the year 2025.

Photovoltaic (PV) cells are increasingly used as standalone units, mostly as off-grid distributed electricity generation to power remote homes, telecommunications equipment, oil and pipeline monitoring stations and navigational devices. The Canadian PV market has grown quickly and Canadian companies make solar modules, controls, specialized water pumps, high-efficiency refrigerators and solar lighting systems. Grid-connected solar PV systems have grown significantly in recent years and reached over 1.8 GW of cumulative installed capacity by the end of 2014.

== Solar potential ==
Canada has plentiful solar energy resources thanks to its large area. Regions of high solar potential based on global horizontal irradiation being located in the British Columbia Interior, southern Alberta, southern Saskatchewan, southern Manitoba, Ontario, southern Quebec, New Brunswick, southern Nova Scotia, and western Prince Edward Island. The regions of highest solar potential are located in southern extremes of Alberta, Saskatchewan, and Ontario.

However, the country has a relatively low level of solar irradiance due to its high latitude. This, combined with cloud cover, results in a low 6% capacity factor, compared to a 15% capacity factor in the United States for solar power generators. The northern territories have a smaller solar potential, and less direct sunlight, because of their even higher latitude. The National Energy Board predicts that solar electricity will grow to be 1.2% of the country's total energy production by 2040.

== By region ==
=== Ontario ===
With the introduction of a Feed-in tariff (FIT) in 2009, Ontario became a global leader for solar energy projects. The program was the first of its kind in North America. Thanks to the FIT program, Ontario was the home of what was temporarily the largest solar farm in the world (in October 2010) until surpassed by larger farms in China and India. Located in Sarnia, Ontario, the 97 megawatt Sarnia Photovoltaic Power Plant can power more than 12,000 homes. Ontario has several other large PV power plants, other than the Sarnia plant. The 23.4 MW Arnprior Solar Generating Station was built in 2009. Additionally, a 68 megawatt solar farm can be found in Sault Ste. Marie, and a new 100 megawatt solar farm was built in Kingston, Ontario in 2015.

The most recent concentrated solar thermal power and storage technologies were barred from the FIT. The reason offered was that the technologies are not proven in Ontario climate.

The FIT program is intended for installations over 10 kW, while the microFIT program is to encourage the development of micro-scale renewable energy projects, such as residential solar photovoltaic (PV) installations. The microFIT program provides a rate of $0.802/kWh for rooftop mounted solar panels. On July 2, 2010 the microFIT's program rate (for ground-mounted systems only) was lowered to $0.642/kWh by the Ontario Power Authority (OPA). This new rate means consumers investing in solar energy through the Ontario microFIT Program will experience a drop in profit margin from a 25% range to 10%. On April 5, 2012 the rate was reduced to $0.549/kWh. The 2012 target is for 50 MW to be installed. As of August 7, 2012, 9,764 applications for the FIT have been submitted, totaling 8,504 MW. 1,757 applications have been submitted for the microFIT program, totaling 16 MW. Ontario plans to end coal generation by 2014.

As of 2021, Ontario generated 5% of the year's 148.3 TWh electricity using solar power. As of 2024, its solar capacity was 2800 MW, which was 52% of Canada's total.

== Statistics ==
History of Canadian PV deployment in megawatts since 1996

PV capacity and generation in Canada by year
Year	Σ Installed (MWp)	Δ Installed (MWp)	Generation (GWh)
1992	0.96		
1993	1.23	0.2	
1994	1.51	0.3	
1995	1.86	0.4	
1996	2.56	0.7	
1997	3.38	0.8	
1998	4.47	1.1	
1999	5.83	1.3	
2000	7.15	1.4	
2001	8.83	1.6	
2002	10.00	1.2	
2003	11.83	1.8	
2004	13.88	2.1	
2005	16.75	2.85	
2006	20.48	3.75	
2007	25.77	5.3	
2008	32.72	6.9	
2009	94.57	61.87	
2010	281.13	186.43	
2011	558.29	297	400
2012	765.97	268	
2013	1,210.48	444.51	
2014	1,843.08	632.60	
2015	2,240	397	
2016	2,600	360	
2017	2,800	200	
2018	3,040	240	
2019	4,844	1,804	
2020	4,914	70	

== Agrivoltaics in Canada ==
Agrivoltaics is gaining attention in Canada as a promising way to combine solar energy production with agriculture. This method allows solar panels to be installed on farmland without stopping crop growth or livestock grazing. It offers a solution to land use conflicts by making dual use of the same space.

Recent research has shown that installing solar panels on just 1% of Canada's agricultural land could generate between a quarter and over a third of the country’s total electricity needs. Provinces like Alberta, Saskatchewan, and Ontario have especially high potential due to their large farmland areas and good sunlight levels. Agrivoltaics also supports Canada's goals to reduce greenhouse gas emissions and increase renewable energy use.

== See also ==
- Solar power by country
- Feed-in tariff program in Canada
- Green Energy Act 2009
- Renewable energy in Canada
- Wind power in Canada
- Geothermal power in Canada
- Hydroelectricity in Canada
- List of renewable energy topics by country
- Global Solar Atlas
