= Wind power in Canada =

Wind power installed capacity and generation in Canada

Wind power has a history in Canada dating back many decades, particularly on prairie farms. As of December 2021, wind power generating capacity was approximately 14,304 megawatts (MW). Combined with 2,399 MW of solar power generating capacity, this provided about 6.5% of Canada's electricity demand as of 2020. The Canadian Wind Energy Association (CanWEA) has outlined a future strategy for wind energy that would reach a capacity of 55 GW by 2025, meeting 20% of the country's energy needs.

== Installed capacity ==
Wind generation capacity by year in Canada
Installed wind power generating capacity
since 2000 (MW)

Province/territory	December 2021 installed capacity (MW)	December 2024 installed capacity (MW)
Alberta	2,178	5,715
British Columbia	743	747
Manitoba	259	258
New Brunswick	355	397
Newfoundland and Labrador	55	55
Northwest Territories	9	13
Nova Scotia	616	620
Nunavut		0.2
Ontario	5,536	5,532
Prince Edward Island	204	204
Québec	3,920	4,072
Saskatchewan	429	818
Yukon	0.8	4
Total	14,304.8	18,435.2

== History ==
=== 1990s ===
Early development of wind energy in Canada was located primarily in Ontario, Quebec, and Alberta. Alberta built the first commercial wind farm in Canada in 1993. Throughout the late 1990s and early years of the 21st Century every Canadian province has pursued wind power to supplement their provincial energy grids.

=== 2009 ===
British Columbia was the last province to add wind power to its grid with the completion of the Bear Mountain Wind Park in November 2009. With increasing population growth, Canada has seen wind power as a way to diversify energy supplies away from traditional reliance on fossil fuel burning thermal plants and heavy reliance on hydroelectricity in some provinces. In provinces like Nova Scotia, where only 12% of electricity comes from renewable sources, the development of wind energy projects will provide a measure of electricity security that some jurisdictions are lacking. In the case of British Columbia, wind energy will help close the electricity deficit that the province is facing into the 2010s and help reduce the reliance on importing power from other jurisdictions that may not use renewable energy sources.

=== 2011–2015 ===
An additional 2,004 megawatts of wind power is to come on stream in Quebec between 2011 and 2015. The new energy will cost 10.5 cents per kilowatt-hour, a price described as "highly competitive".

=== 2019 ===
Continuing 2018's growth, Canada finished 2019 with 13,413 MW of wind energy capacity - enough to power approximately 3.4 million homes. The year saw completion of five projects that added 597 MW of new installed capacity, representing over $1 billion of investment. Canada is home to the world's ninth largest wind generating fleet.

== Wind hybrid projects ==
Contributors to the main power grid are wind-diesel and wind-hydrogen. Canadian examples are the community of Ramea, Newfoundland and Labrador that initially used a wind-diesel system and is now being converted to wind-hydrogen technology, and a 10MW / 20MWh battery at the 66 MW Summerview II wind farm in Alberta.

== Wind power industry ==
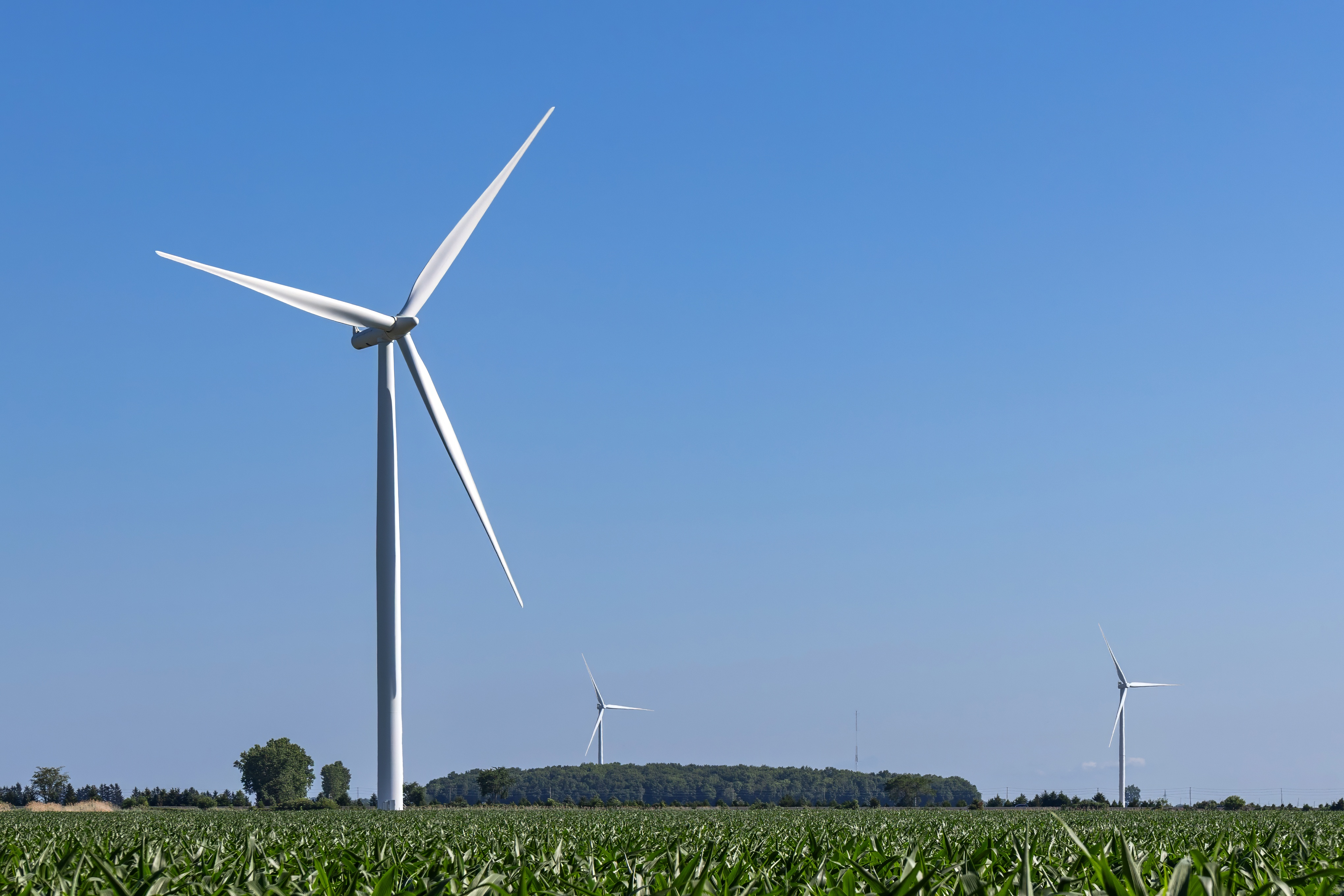
Wind turbines along North Middle Road, Essex County, Ontario

Canadian industry had initially started to supply major components for wind tower projects, Mitsubishi Hitachi Power Systems Canada, Ltd. being one example. In more recent years, closure of these operations has also been observed.

- Siemens blade manufacturing was announced for Tillsonburg in 2010. The facility was closed in 2017.
- Samsung and partners announce wind tower manufacturing facility CS Wind for Windsor in 2010. The facility was closed in 2019.

== Public opinion ==
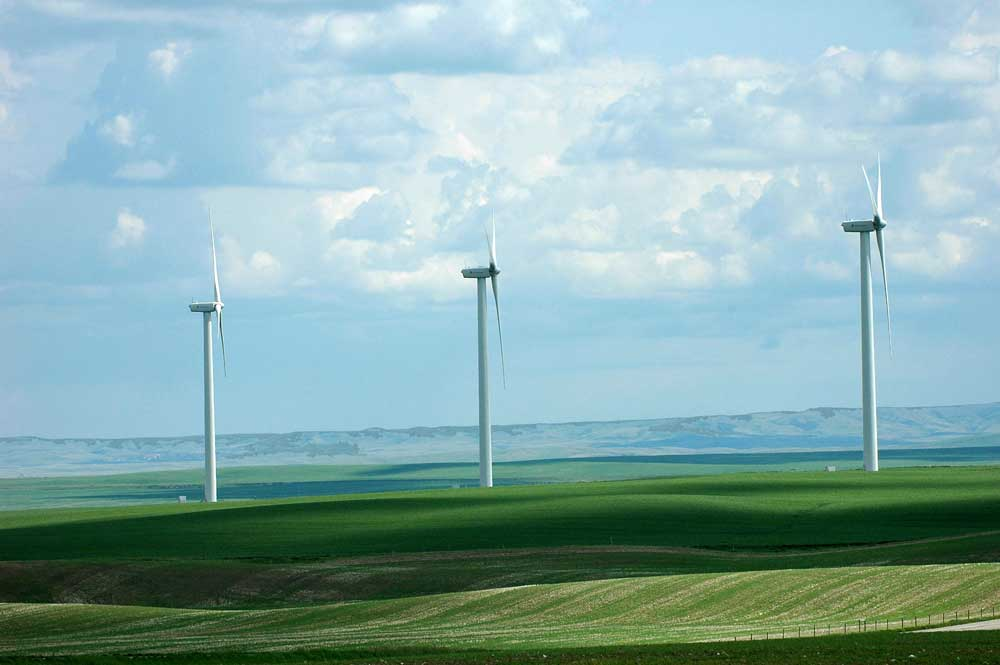
Magrath Wind Farm in Magrath, Alberta

In a survey conducted by Angus Reid Strategies in October 2007, 89 per cent of respondents said that using renewable energy sources like wind or solar power was positive for Canada, because these sources were better for the environment. Only 4 per cent considered using renewable sources as negative since they can be unreliable and expensive.

According to a Saint Consulting survey in April 2007, wind power was the alternative energy source most likely to gain public support for future development in Canada, with only 16% opposed to this type of energy. By contrast, three out of four Canadians opposed nuclear power developments.

Despite this general support for the concept of wind power in the public at large, local opposition often exists, primarily from residents concerned about visual and light pollution, noise or reduced property values. The construction of wind turbines has a negative effect on rural communities, since landowners who receive payments to allow wind turbines on their land are seen as sellouts who are unconcerned with the wind turbine's effect on their neighbours. Public opposition has had the desired effect in some cases, aborting or delaying construction of wind turbines. This opposition has been described as a case of NIMBYism.

Several wind farms in Canada have become tourist attractions, to the surprise of the owners.

== Proposed future strategies ==
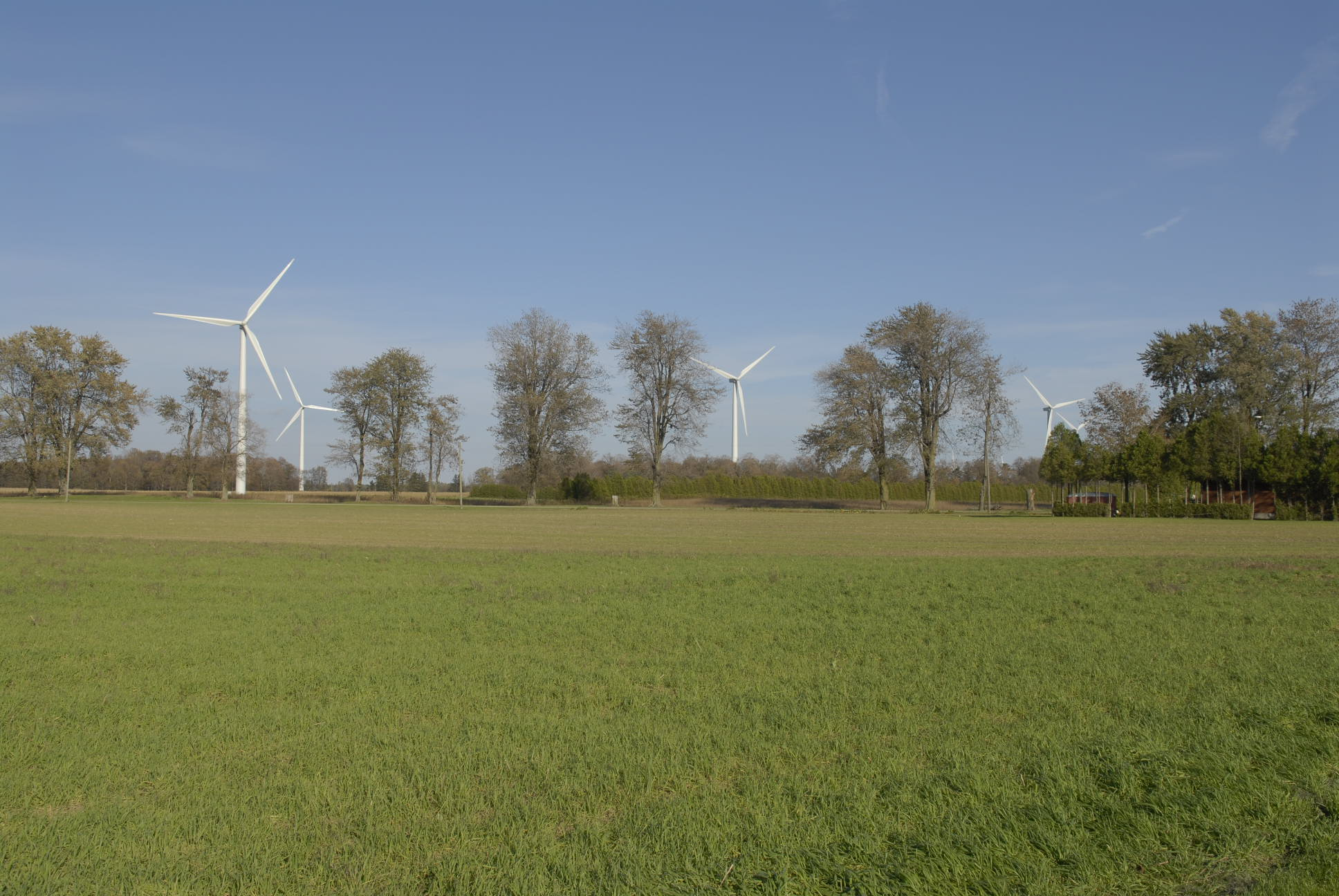
Port Burwell Wind Farm, Ontario, Canada

=== Wind farms on crown land ===
Some rural communities want Alberta to grant companies the right to develop wind farms on leased Crown land.

=== Wind Vision 2025 ===
In 2008, the Canadian Wind Energy Association (CanWEA), a non-profit trade association, outlined a future strategy for wind energy that would reach a capacity of 55,000 MW by 2025, fulfilling 20% of the country's energy needs. The plan, Wind Vision 2025, could create over 50,000 jobs and represent around CDN$165 million annual revenue. If achieved, CanWEA's target would make the country a major player in the wind power sector and would create around CDN$79 billion of investment. It would also save an estimated 17 megatonnes of greenhouse gas emissions annually.

CanWEA recommended to add 500 MW of capacity in Quebec each year from 2018 to 2025.

== Offshore wind ==
The Nova East Wind project is proposed to be built with 20–25 turbines off the coast of Nova Scotia.

== Support schemes ==
=== Ontario's Large Renewable Procurement (cancelled) ===
The LRP was viewed an important tool of Ontario's commitment to reach the province's 2025 target for renewable energy to comprise about 50% of Ontario's installed capacity. Projects of more than 10 MW of capacity were eligible to obtain a 20-year contract through a price competitive auction.

- LRP I: concluded in April 2016, with the execution of 299.5 onshore wind contracts.
- LRP II: kicked off on July 29, 2016 with the launch of the Request for Qualifications (RFQ), and with the aim of allocating up to 600 MW of onshore wind, and 50 MW of technological upgrades of existing renewable energy facilities. However, this round was suspended on September 27, 2016.

The LRP program, part of the Green Energy Act (GEA), was cancelled by the government of Doug Ford, who had campaigned on terminating it.

== See also ==
- Electricity sector in Canada
- List of wind farms in Canada
- Renewable energy in Canada
- Solar power in Canada
- Geothermal power in Canada
- Hydroelectricity in Canada
