= Renewable energy debate =

Global public support for energy sources, based on a survey by Ipsos (2011).

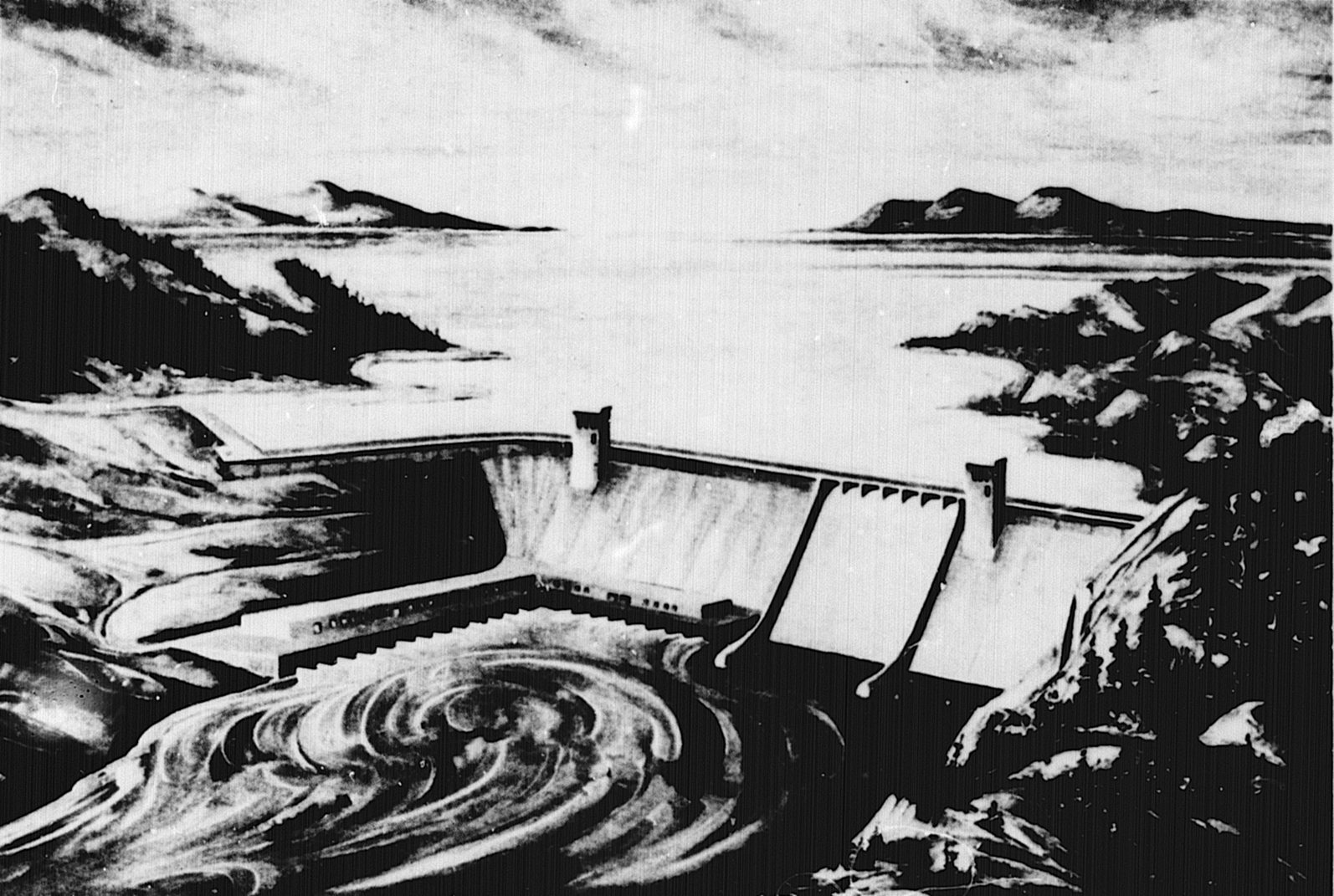
The 5 GW Rampart Dam was terminated as a result of concerns about indigenous people and ecological conservation issues.

Policy makers often debate the constraints and opportunities of renewable energy.

Renewable electricity production, from sources such as wind power and solar power, is sometimes criticized for being variable or intermittent. The International Energy Agency has stated that its significance depends on a range of factors, such as the penetration of the renewables concerned.

There have been concerns relating to the visual and other impacts of some wind farms, with local residents sometimes fighting or blocking construction. In the US, the Massachusetts Cape Wind project was delayed for years partly because of such concerns. Residents in other areas have been more positive, and there are community wind farm developments. According to a town councillor, the overwhelming majority of locals believe the Ardrossan Wind Farm in Scotland has enhanced the area.

The market for renewable energy technologies has continued to grow. Climate change concerns, coupled with high oil prices, peak oil, and increasing government support, are driving increasing renewable energy legislation, incentives and commercialization. New government spending, regulation and policies helped the industry weather the 2009 economic crisis better than many other sectors.

The concerns about environmental impacts of renewable energy are presented by the proponents of theories like degrowth and steady-state economy as one of the proofs that for achieving sustainability technological methods are not enough and there is a need to limit consumption.

== Definition of renewable energy ==
The International Energy Agency defines renewable energy saying

Renewable energy is derived from natural processes that are replenished constantly. In its various forms, it derives directly from the sun, or from heat generated deep within the earth. Included in the definition is electricity and heat generated from solar, wind, ocean, hydropower, biomass, geothermal resources, and biofuels and hydrogen derived from renewable resources.

Renewable energy resources exist over wide geographical areas, in contrast to other energy sources, which are concentrated in a limited number of countries.

== Variable renewable energy ==
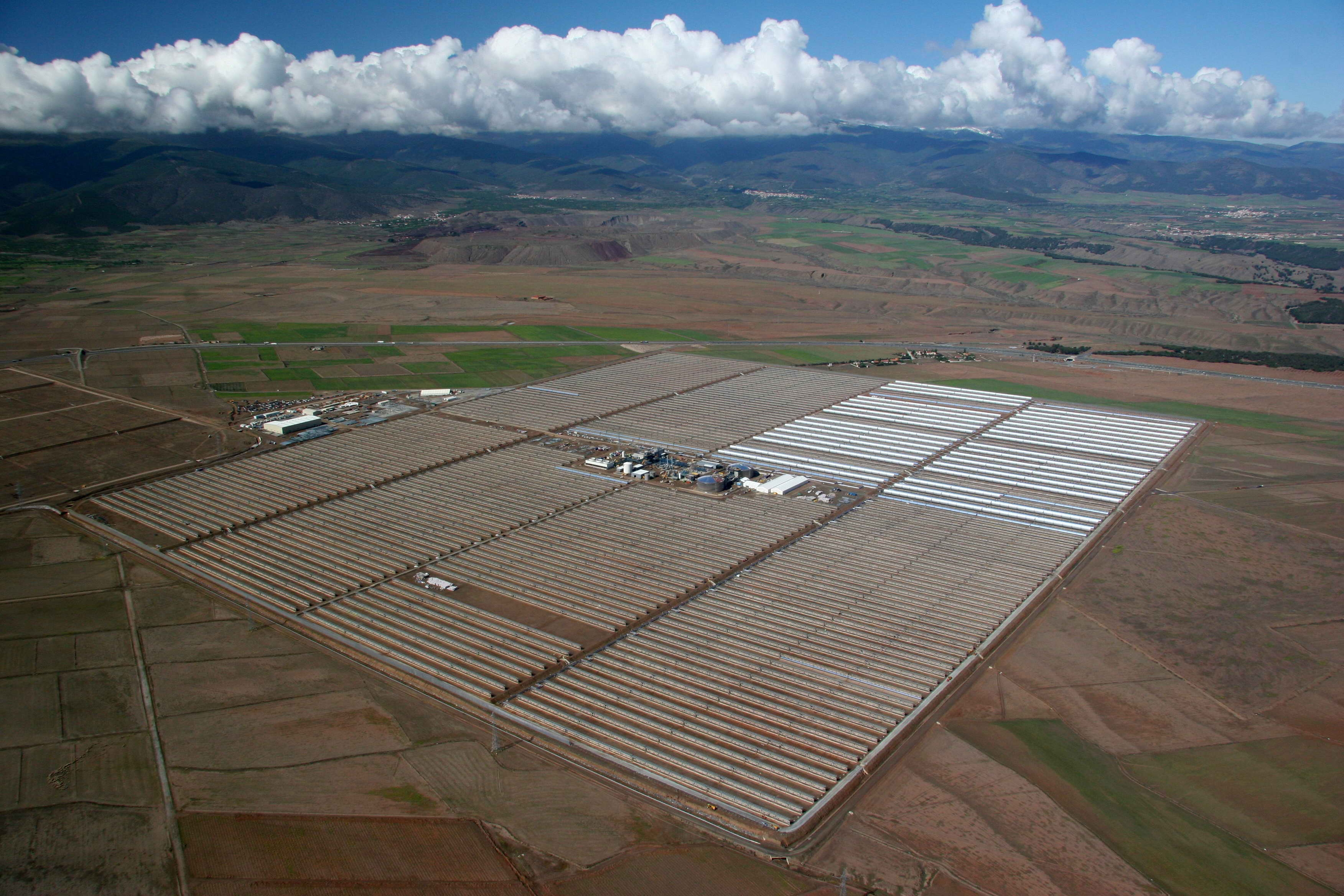
The 150 MW Andasol solar power station is a commercial parabolic trough solar thermal power plant, located in Spain. The Andasol plant uses tanks of molten salt to store solar energy so that it can continue generating electricity even when the sun isn't shining.

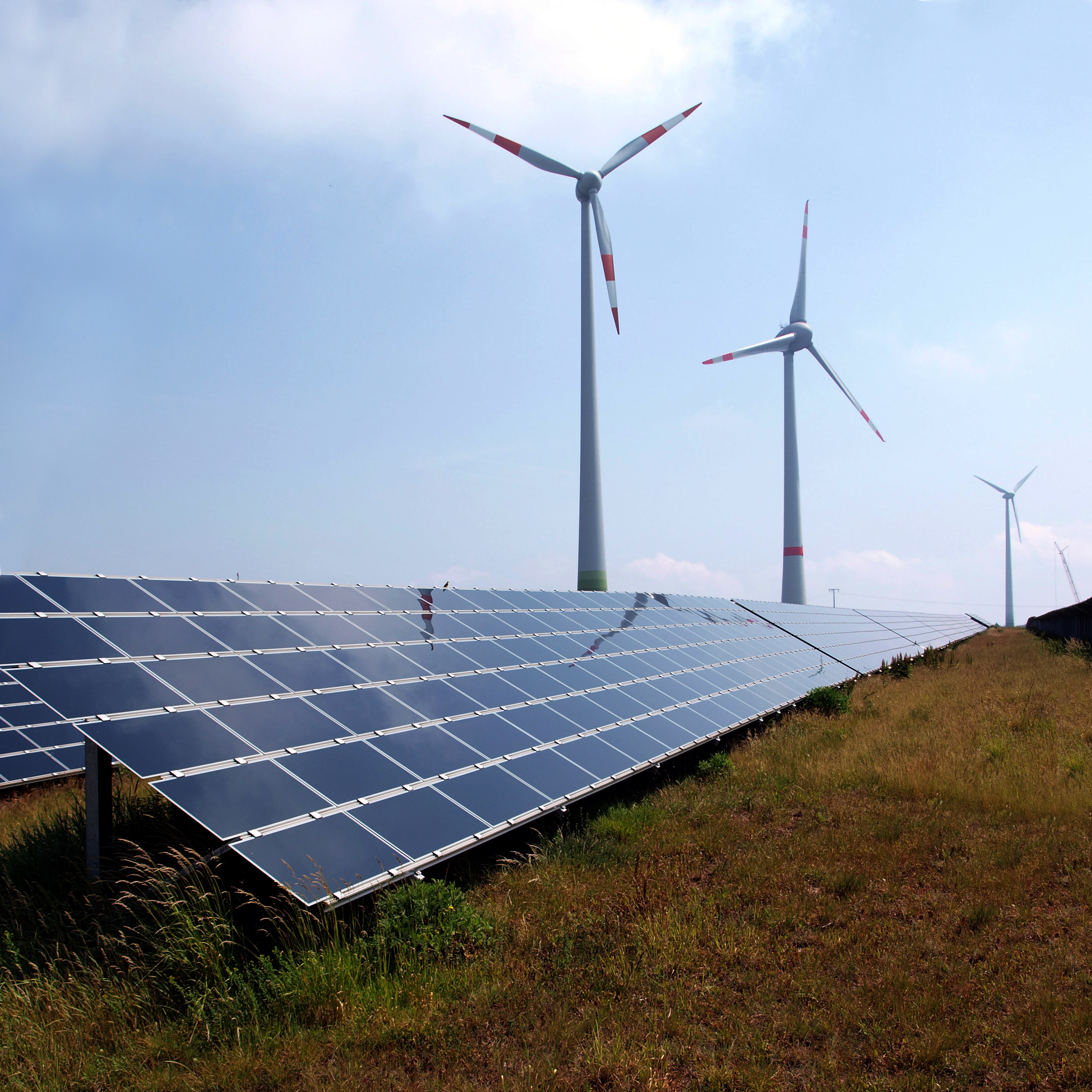
Photovoltaic array and wind turbines at the Schneebergerhof wind farm in the German state of Rheinland-Pfalz

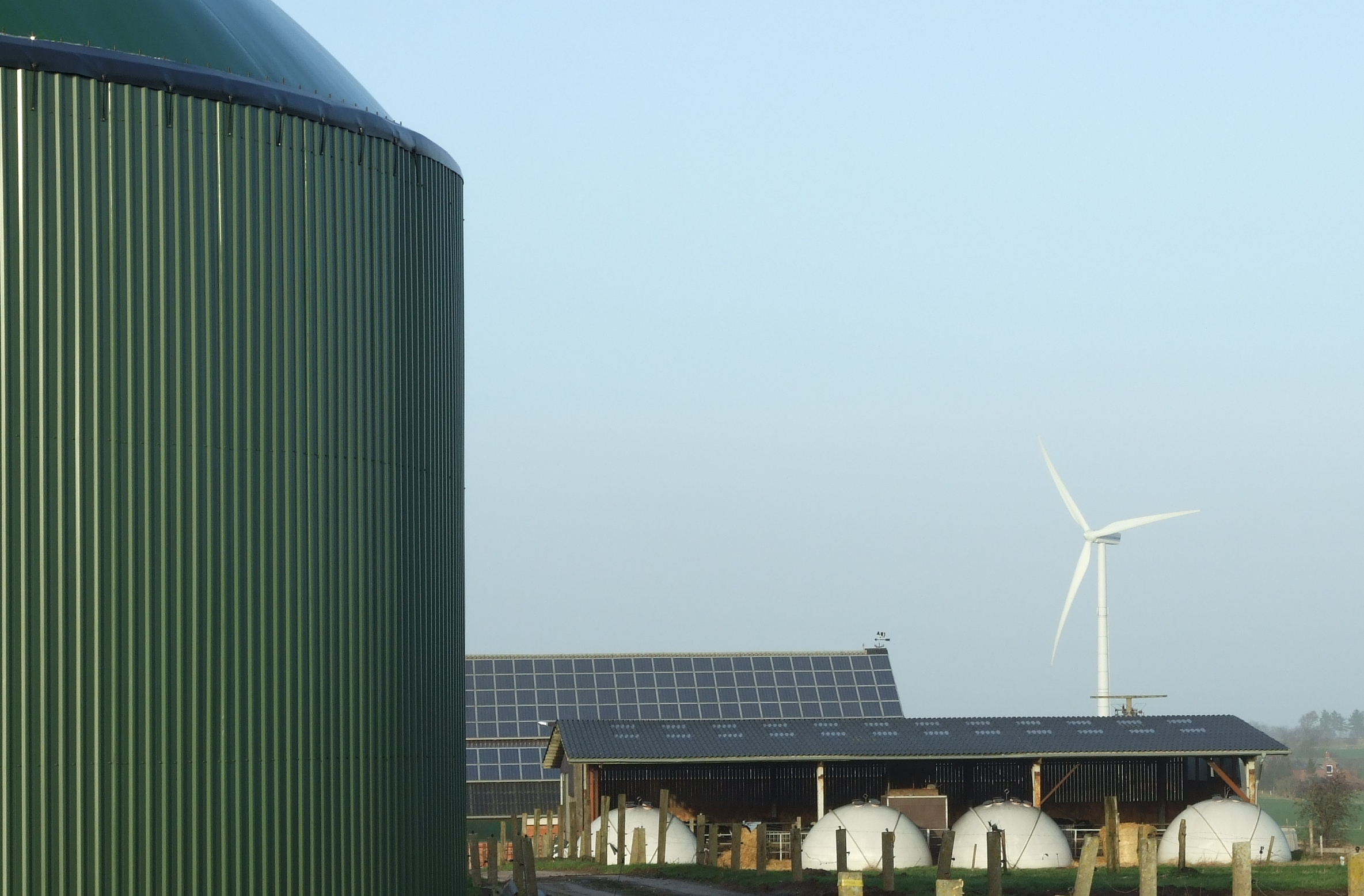
Biogas fermenter, wind turbine and photovoltaics on a farm in Horstedt, Schleswig-Holstein, Germany

Variability inherently affects solar energy, as the production of electricity from solar sources depends on the amount of light energy in a given location. Solar output varies throughout the day, the seasons, with cloud cover and by latitude on the globe. Windblown sand erodes glass in dry climates, protective layers add expenses. These factors are fairly predictable, and some solar thermal systems make use of molten salt heat storage to produce power when the sun is not shining.

Wind-generated power is a variable resource, and the amount of electricity produced at any given point in time by a given plant will depend on wind speeds, air density, and turbine characteristics (among other factors). If wind speed is too low (less than about 2.5 m/s) then the wind turbines will not be able to make electricity, and if it is too high (more than about 25 m/s) the turbines will have to be shut down to avoid damage. While the output from a single turbine can vary greatly and rapidly as local wind speeds vary, as more turbines are connected over larger and larger areas the average power output becomes less variable.

Capacity factors for PV solar are rather poor varying between 10 and 20% of the rated nameplate capacity. Onshore wind is better at 20-35% and offshore wind is best at 45%. This means that more total capacity needs to be installed in order to achieve an average output for the year. The capacity factor relates to statements about capacity increases, generation may have increased by a much smaller figure.

The International Energy Agency says that there has been too much attention on issue of the variability of renewable electricity production. This issue only applies to certain renewable technologies, mainly wind power and solar photovoltaics, and to a lesser extent run-of-the-river hydroelectricity. The significance of this "predictable variability depends on a range of factors which include the market penetration of the renewables concerned, the nature of the energy sources used to balance the intermittentcy, as well as demand side flexibility. Variability will rarely be a barrier to increased renewable energy deployment. But at high levels of market penetration it requires careful analysis and management, and additional costs may be required for dispatchable back-up or system modification. Renewable electricity supply in the 20-50+% penetration range has already been implemented in several European systems, albeit in the context of an integrated European grid system:

In 2011, the Intergovernmental Panel on Climate Change, the world's leading climate researchers selected by the United Nations, said "as infrastructure and energy systems develop, in spite of the complexities, there are few, if any, fundamental technological limits to integrating a portfolio of renewable energy technologies to meet a majority share of total energy demand in locations where suitable renewable resources exist or can be supplied". IPCC scenarios "generally indicate that growth in renewable energy will be widespread around the world". The IPCC said that if governments were supportive, and the full complement of renewable energy technologies were deployed, renewable energy supply could account for almost 80% of the world's energy use within forty years. Rajendra Pachauri, chairman of the IPCC, said the necessary investment in renewables would cost only about 1% of global GDP annually. This approach could contain greenhouse gas levels to less than 450 parts per million, the safe level beyond which climate change becomes catastrophic and irreversible.

Mark Z. Jacobson says that there is no shortage of renewable energy and a "smart mix" of renewable energy sources can be used to reliably meet electricity demand:

Because the wind blows during stormy conditions when the sun does not shine and the sun often shines on calm days with little wind, combining wind and solar can go a long way toward meeting demand, especially when geothermal provides a steady base and hydroelectric can be called on to fill in the gaps.

As physicist Amory Lovins has said:

The variability of sun, wind and so on, turns out to be a non-problem if you do several sensible things. One is to diversify your renewables by technology, so that weather conditions bad for one kind are good for another. Second, you diversify by site so they're not all subject to the same weather pattern at the same time because they're in the same place. Third, you use standard weather forecasting techniques to forecast wind, sun and rain, and of course hydro operators do this right now. Fourth, you integrate all your resources — supply side and demand side..."

The combination of diversifying variable renewables by type and location, forecasting their variation, integration with dispatchable renewables, flexible fueled generators, and demand response has the potential to create a power system that could reliably meet energy needs. Integrating ever-higher levels of renewables has had some successful demonstrations in the real world, in previous decades in the real world:

In 2009, eight American and three European authorities, writing in the leading electrical engineers' professional journal, didn't find "a credible and firm technical limit to the amount of wind energy that can be accommodated by electricity grids". In Fact, not one of more than 200 international studies, nor official studies for the eastern and western U.S. regions, nor the International Energy Agency, has found major costs or technical barriers to reliably integrating up to 30% variable renewable supplies into the grid, and in some studies much more.

Renewable electricity supply in the 20-50+% range has already been implemented in several European systems, albeit in the context of an integrated European grid system:

In 2010, four German states, totalling 10 million people, relied on wind power for 43–52% of their annual electricity needs. Denmark isn't far behind, supplying 22% of its power from wind in 2010 (26% in an average wind year). The Extremadura region of Spain is getting up to 25% of its electricity from solar, while the whole country meets 16% of its demand from wind. Just during 2005–2010, Portugal vaulted from 17% to 45% renewable electricity.

Integration of renewable energy has caused some grid stability problems in Germany. Voltage fluctuations have caused problems with sensitive equipment. In one case, Hydro Aluminium plant in Hamburg was forced to shut down when the rolling mill's highly sensitive monitor stopped production so abruptly that the aluminum belts snagged. They hit the machines and destroyed a piece of the mill. The malfunction was caused when voltage off the electricity grid weakened for a millisecond. A survey of members of the Association of German Industrial Energy Companies (VIK) revealed that the number of short interruptions to the German electricity grid has grown by 29 percent in the years 2009–2012. Over the same time period, the number of service failures has grown 31 percent, and almost half of those failures have led to production stoppages. Damages have ranged between €10,000 and hundreds of thousands of euros, according to company information.

Minnkota Power Cooperative, the leading U.S. wind utility in 2009, supplied 38% of its retail sales from the wind.

Mark A. Delucchi and Mark Z. Jacobson report that there are at least seven ways to design and operate variable renewable energy systems so that they will reliably satisfy electricity demand:

- (A) interconnect geographically dispersed, naturally variable energy sources (e.g., wind, solar, wave, tidal), which smooths out electricity supply (and demand) significantly.
- (B) use complementary and non-variable energy sources (such as hydroelectric power) to fill temporary gaps between demand and wind or solar generation.
- (C) use "smart" demand-response management to shift flexible loads to a time when more renewable energy is available.
- (D) store electric power, at the site of generation, (in batteries, hydrogen gas, molten salts, compressed air, pumped hydroelectric power, and flywheels), for later use.
- (E) over-size renewable peak generation capacity to minimize the times when available renewable power is less than demand and to provide spare power to produce hydrogen for flexible transportation and heat uses.
- (F) store electric power in electric-vehicle batteries, known as "vehicle to grid" or V2G.
- (G) forecast the weather (winds, sunlight, waves, tides and precipitation) to better plan for energy supply needs.

Jacobson and Delucchi argue that wind, water and solar power can be scaled up in cost-effective ways to meet our energy demands, freeing us from dependence on both fossil fuels and nuclear power. In 2009 they published "A Plan to Power 100 Percent of the Planet With Renewables" in Scientific American. The article addressed a number of issues, such as the worldwide spatial footprint of wind turbines, the availability of scarce materials needed for manufacture of new systems, the ability to produce reliable energy on demand and the average cost per kilowatt hour. A more detailed and updated technical analysis has been published as a two-part article in the journal Energy Policy.

Renewable energy is naturally replenished and renewable power technologies increase energy security for the energy poor locales because they reduce dependence on foreign sources of fuel. Unlike power stations relying on uranium and recycled plutonium for fuel, they are not subject to the volatility of global fuel markets. Renewable power decentralises electricity supply and so minimises the need to produce, transport and store hazardous fuels; reliability of power generation is improved by producing power close to the energy consumer. An accidental or intentional outage affects a smaller amount of capacity than an outage at a larger power station.

== Economics and viability ==
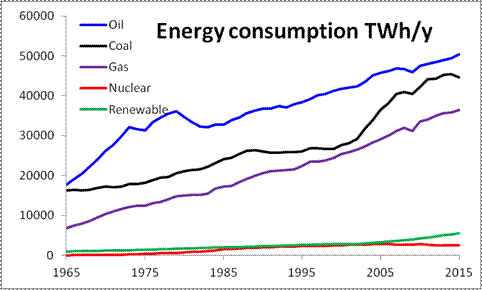
The worldwide growth of renewable energy is shown by the green line

Renewable energy technologies are getting cheaper through technological change and through the benefits of mass production and market competition. A 2011 IEA report said, "A portfolio of renewable energy technologies is becoming cost-competitive in an increasingly broad range of circumstances, in some cases providing investment opportunities without the need for specific economic support," and added that "cost reductions in critical technologies, such as wind and solar, are set to continue." As of 2011, there have been substantial reductions in the cost of solar and wind technologies:

The price of PV modules per MW has fallen by 60 percent since the summer of 2008, according to Bloomberg New Energy Finance estimates, putting solar power for the first time on a competitive footing with the retail price of electricity in a number of sunny countries. Wind turbine prices have also fallen – by 18 percent per MW in the last two years – reflecting, as with solar, fierce competition in the supply chain. Further improvements in the levelised cost of energy for solar, wind and other technologies lie ahead, posing a growing threat to the dominance of fossil fuel generation sources in the next few years.

Hydro-electricity and geothermal electricity produced at favorable sites are now the cheapest way to generate electricity. Renewable energy costs continue to drop, and the levelised cost of electricity (LCOE) is declining for wind power, solar photovoltaic (PV), concentrated solar power (CSP) and some biomass technologies. Wind and Solar are able to produce electricity for 20-40% of the year.

Renewable energy is also the most economic solution for new grid-connected capacity in areas without cheap fossil fuels. As the cost of renewable power falls, the scope of economically viable applications increases. Renewable technologies are now often the most economic solution for new generating capacity. Where "oil-fired generation is the predominant power generation source (e.g. on islands, off-grid and in some countries) a lower-cost renewable solution almost always exists today".

As of 2012, renewable power generation technologies accounted for around half of all new power generation capacity additions globally. In 2011, additions included 41 gigawatt (GW) of new wind power capacity, 30 GW of PV, 25 GW of hydro-electricity, 6 GW of biomass, 0.5 GW of CSP, and 0.1 GW of geothermal power. Hydropower provides 16.3% of the world's electricity. When combined with the other renewables wind, geothermal, solar, biomass and waste: together they make up 21.7% of electricity generation worldwide in 2013.

=== Base load electricity ===
The "base load" is the minimum level of demand on an electrical grid over a span of time, some variation in demand may be compensated by varying production or electricity trading. The criteria for base load power generation are low price, availability and reliability. Over the years as technology and available resources evolved, a variety of power sources have been used. Hydroelectricity was the first method and this is still the case in a few wet climates like Brazil, Canada, Norway and Iceland. Coal became the most popular base load supply with the development of the steam turbine and bulk transport, and this is standard in much of the world. Nuclear power is also used and is in competition with coal, France is predominantly nuclear and uses less than 10% fossil fuel. In the US, the increasing popularity of natural gas is likely to replace coal as the base. There is no country where the majority of base load power is supplied by wind, solar, biofuels or geothermal, as each of these sources fails one or more of the criteria of low price, availability and reliability. However, there are many countries which meet more than 80% of electricity from the hydro power and the variable renewable energy sources (RES). It is feasible to meet 100% electricity demand including base load, at lower price with 100% reliability, by a mix of various dependable RES (solar thermal storage plants, peaking hydro plants and pumped storage hydro plants) and variable RES (solar PV, wind power and run of the river hydro plants) as RES power generation cost (particularly solar PV) has fallen below the operating/fuel cost of coal/natural gas fired base load power stations. The surplus and cheaper solar PV power generated during the day light is stored by the pumped storage hydro power plants to meet electricity demand round the clock throughout the year. The existing fossil and nuclear fuel based power generation can only sustain till their supplementation is required for the RES power generation. As the RES power generation cost is so cheap and environment friendly, there is no scope for new fossil and nuclear fuel based power plants. Also lithium-ion battery price is expected to reduce from US$176/kWh in 2019 to US$94/kWh by 2024 which will make roof top solar PV with battery storage system more affordable in decentralized stand alone microgrid without the need to spend additionally on the huge centralized power grid.

== Environmental, social and legal considerations ==
Renewable power technologies can have significant environmental benefits. Unlike coal and natural gas, they can generate electricity and fuels without releasing significant quantities of CO_{2} and other greenhouse gases that contribute to climate change, however the greenhouse gas savings from a number of biofuels have been found to be much less than originally anticipated, as discussed in the article Indirect land use change impacts of biofuels.

The transition to renewable energy depends on non-renewable resources, such as mined metals. Manufacturing of photovoltaic panels, wind turbines and batteries requires significant amounts of rare-earth elements which has significant social and environmental impact if mined in forests and protected areas. In the year 2020, mining areas for materials needed for renewables overlapped with 16% of wilderness areas. Producing 1 ton of rare earth element produces 2,000 tons of toxic waste. Due to co-occurrence of rare-earth and radioactive elements (thorium, uranium and radium), rare-earth mining results in production of low-level radioactive waste. Extracting lithium, which is needed for making batteries and EVs, requires big amounts of water, which causes negative environmental and social effects.

Both solar and wind have been criticized from an aesthetic point of view. However, methods and opportunities exist to deploy these renewable technologies efficiently and unobtrusively: fixed solar collectors can double as noise barriers along highways, and extensive roadway, parking lot, and roof-top area is currently available; amorphous photovoltaic cells can also be used to tint windows and produce energy. Advocates of renewable energy also argue that current infrastructure is less aesthetically pleasing than alternatives, but sited further from the view of most critics.

=== Hydroelectricity ===
In 2015, hydropower generated 16.6% of the worlds total electricity and 70% of all renewable electricity. The major advantage of conventional hydroelectric systems with reservoirs is their ability to store potential power for later production on demand. When used in conjunction with intermittent sources like wind and solar, a constant supply of electricity is achieved. Other advantages include longer life than fuel-fired generation, low operating costs, and other uses of the reservoir. In areas without natural water flow, pumped-storage plants provide a constant supply of electricity. Overall, hydroelectric power can be far less expensive than electricity generated from fossil fuels or nuclear energy, and areas with abundant hydroelectric power attract industry. In Canada it's estimated there are 160,000 megawatts of undeveloped hydro potential.

However, there are several disadvantages associated with conventional dam and reservoir hydroelectricity. These include dislocation if there are people living where the reservoirs are planned, release of significant amounts of carbon dioxide at construction and flooding of the reservoir, disruption of aquatic ecosystems and birdlife, adverse impacts on the river environment, potential risks of sabotage and terrorism, and in rare cases, catastrophic failure of the dam wall.

==== Advantages ====
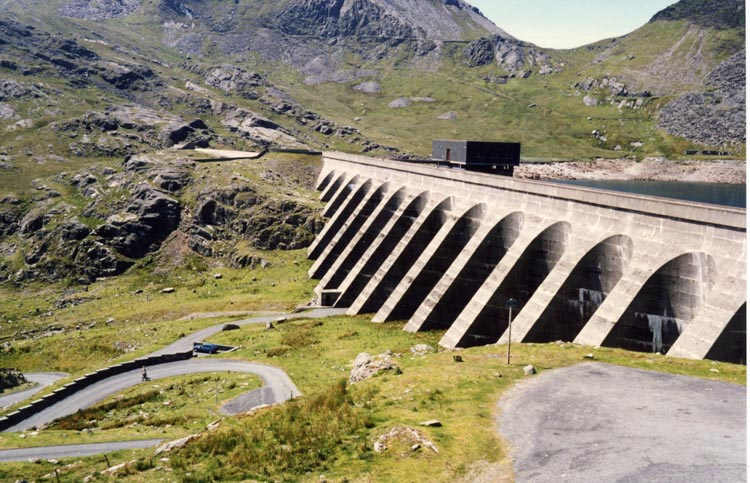
The Ffestiniog Power Station can generate 360 MW of electricity within 60 seconds of the demand arising.

- Economic gains

Hydro is a flexible source of electricity since plants can be ramped up and down very quickly to adapt to changing electrical demands. The cost of operating a hydroelectric plant is nearly immune to changes in the cost or availability of fossil fuels such as oil, natural gas or coal, and no imports are needed. The average cost of electricity from a hydro plant larger than 10 megawatts is 3 to 5 U.S. cents per kilowatt-hour. Hydroelectric plants have long economic lives, with some plants still in service after 50–100 years. Operating labor cost is also usually low, as plants are automated and have few personnel on site during normal operation.

- Industrial use

While many hydroelectric projects supply public electricity networks, some are created to serve specific industrial enterprises. Dedicated hydroelectric projects are often built to provide the substantial amounts of electricity needed for aluminium electrolytic plants, for example. The Grand Coulee Dam switched to support Alcoa aluminium in Bellingham, Washington, United States for American World War II airplanes before it was allowed to provide irrigation and power to citizens (in addition to aluminium power) after the war. In Suriname, the Brokopondo Reservoir was constructed to provide electricity for the Alcoa aluminium industry. New Zealand's Manapouri Power Station was constructed to supply electricity to the aluminium smelter at Tiwai Point.

- Low impact on climate change

Since hydroelectric dams do not burn fossil fuels, they do not directly produce carbon dioxide or pollutants. While some carbon dioxide is produced during cement manufacture and construction of the project, this is a tiny fraction of the operating emissions of equivalent fossil-fuel electricity generation. One measurement of greenhouse gas and other external comparison between energy sources can be found in the ExternE project by the Paul Scherrer Institut and the University of Stuttgart which was funded by the European Commission. According to that study, hydroelectricity produces the least amount of greenhouse gases and externality of any energy source. Coming in second place was wind, third was nuclear energy, and fourth was solar photovoltaic. The low greenhouse gas impact of hydroelectricity is found especially in temperate climates. The above study was for local energy in Europe; presumably similar conditions prevail in North America and Northern Asia, which all see a regular, natural freeze/thaw cycle (with associated seasonal plant decay and regrowth). Greater greenhouse gas emissions of methane are found in the tropical regions.

- Other reservoir uses

The cost of large dams and reservoirs is justified by some of the added benefits. Reservoirs often provide facilities for water sports, and become tourist attractions themselves. In some countries, aquaculture in reservoirs is common. Multi-use dams installed for irrigation support agriculture with a relatively constant water supply. Large reservoirs can control flooding and alleviate droughts, which would otherwise harm people living downstream. The Columbia River Treaty between the US and Canada required that in the 1960s and 1970s, very large reservoirs were constructed for flood control. In order to offset the cost of dam construction, some locations included large hydroelectric plants.

==== Disadvantages ====
- Reservoir land requirements

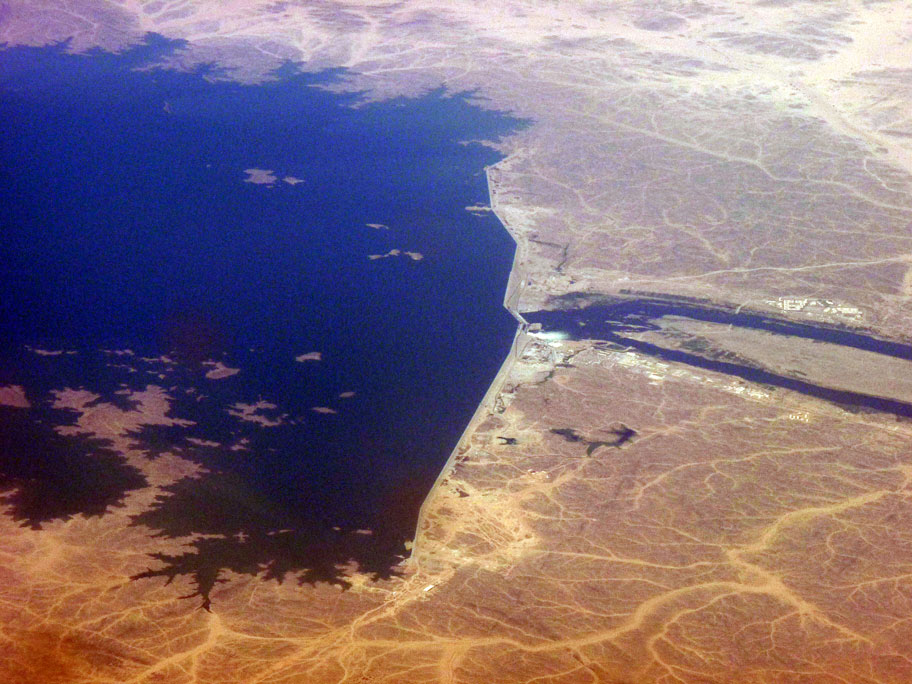
Hydroelectric power stations that use dams would submerge large areas of land due to the requirement of a reservoir.

Large reservoirs required for the operation of conventional hydroelectric dams result in submersion of extensive areas upstream of the dams, changing biologically rich and productive lowland and riverine valley forests, marshland and grasslands into artificial lakes. Ideally, a reservoir would be large enough to average the annual flow of water or in its smallest form provide sufficient water for irrigation. The loss of land is often exacerbated by habitat fragmentation of surrounding areas caused by the reservoir. In Europe and North America, environmental concerns around land flooded by large reservoirs ended 30 years of dam construction in the 1990s. Since then, only run of the river projects have been approved. Large dams and reservoirs continue to be built in countries like China, Brazil and India.

- Reservoirs displace communities

A consequence is the need to relocate the people living where the reservoirs are planned. In 2000, the World Commission on Dams estimated that dams had physically displaced 40-80 million people worldwide. An example is the contentious Three Gorges Dam which displaced 1.24 million residents. In 1954, the river flooded 193,000 km^{2} (74,518 sq mi), killing 33,000 people and forcing 18 million people to move to higher ground. The dam now provides a flood storage capacity for 22 cubic kilometres of water.

- Reservoir siltation

When water flows, it has the ability to transport particles heavier than itself downstream. This may negatively affect the reservoir capacity and subsequently their power stations, particularly those on rivers or within catchment areas with high siltation. Siltation can fill a reservoir and reduce its capacity to control floods along with causing additional horizontal pressure on the upstream portion of the dam. Eventually, some reservoirs can become full of sediment and useless or over-top during a flood and fail.

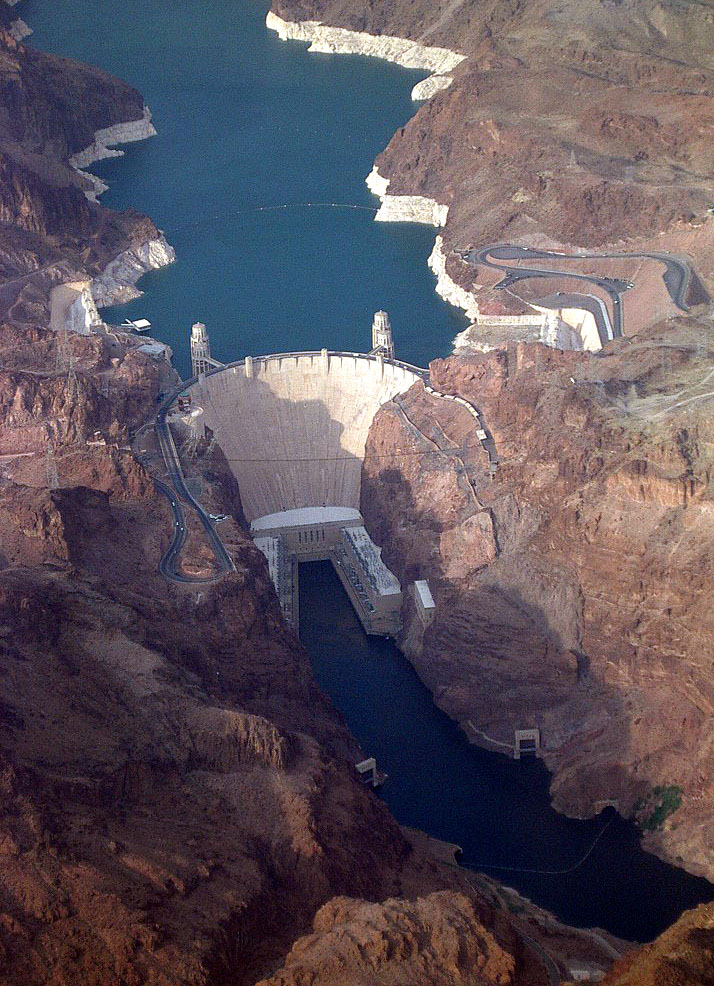
The Hoover Dam in the United States is a large conventional dammed-hydro facility, with an installed capacity of 2,080 MW.

- Reservoirs methane generation

Some reservoirs in tropical regions produce substantial amounts of methane. This is due to plant material in flooded areas decaying in an anaerobic environment, and forming methane, a greenhouse gas. According to the World Commission on Dams report, where the reservoir is large compared to the generating capacity (less than 100 watts per square metre of surface area) and no clearing of the forests in the area was undertaken prior to impoundment of the reservoir, greenhouse gas emissions from the reservoir may be higher than those of a conventional oil-fired thermal generation plant. There is a lack of knowledge in the scientific community regarding reservoir GHG emissions, producing many diverging positions. To resolve this situation, the International Energy Agency is coordinating an analysis of actual emissions. In boreal reservoirs of Canada and Northern Europe, greenhouse gas emissions are typically only 2% to 8% of any kind of conventional fossil-fuel thermal generation. A new class of underwater logging operation that targets drowned forests can mitigate the effect of forest decay.

- Reservoir safety

Because large conventional dammed-hydro facilities hold back large volumes of water, a failure due to poor construction, natural disasters or sabotage can be catastrophic to downriver settlements and infrastructure. During Typhoon Nina in 1975, Banqiao Dam failed in Southern China when more than a year's worth of rain fell within 24 hours. The resulting flood resulted in the deaths of 26,000 people, and another 145,000 from epidemics. Millions were left homeless. Also, the creation of a dam in a geologically inappropriate location may cause disasters such as 1963 disaster at Vajont Dam in Italy, where almost 2000 people died. Smaller dams and micro hydro facilities create less risk, but can form continuing hazards even after being decommissioned. For example, the small 1939 Kelly Barnes Dam failed in 1967, causing 39 deaths with the Toccoa Flood, ten years after its power plant was decommissioned.

- Downstream aquatic ecosystem

Hydroelectric projects can be disruptive to surrounding aquatic ecosystems downstream of the plant site. Changes in the amount of river flow will correlate with the amount of energy produced by a dam. Water exiting a reservoir usually contains very little suspended sediment, which can lead to scouring of river beds and loss of riverbanks. For fish migration, a fish ladder may be required. For fish, going through a high head turbine is usually fatal. Reservoir water passing through a turbine alters the downstream river environment. Downstream changes to the water temperature and dissolved gases have adverse effects on some species of fish. In addition to this, alteration to the amount of water let through the dam can also change the composition of gasses in the water downstream. Changes in the amount of discharged water also have the ability to interrupt mating season for various species of fish by dewatering their spawning grounds and forcing them to retreat. Even if mating season has passed, any newly hatched fry can be killed off by low water levels in their spawning areas.

=== Solar power ===
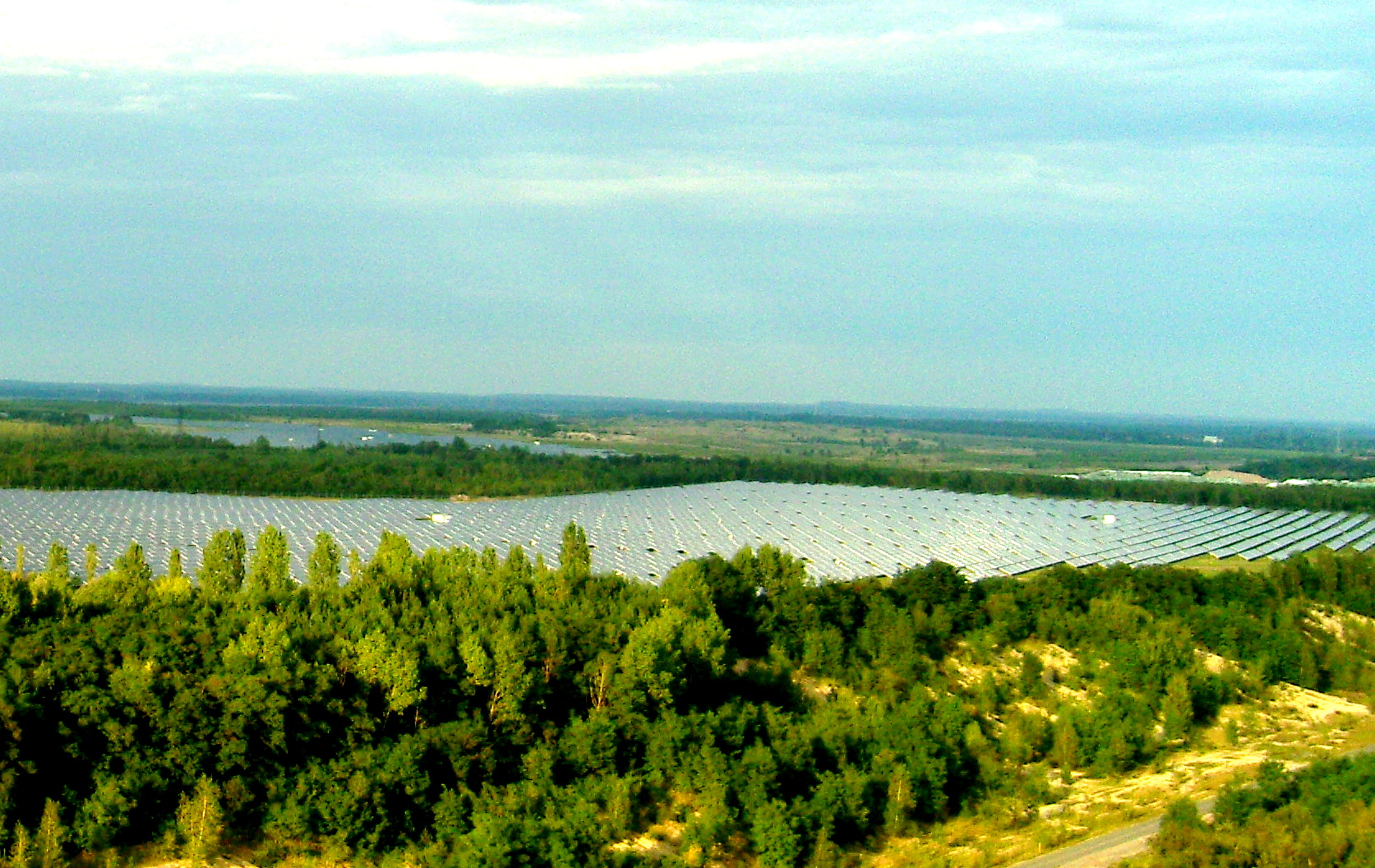
Part of the Senftenberg Solarpark, a solar photovoltaic power plant located on former open-pit mining areas close to the city of Senftenberg, in Eastern Germany. The 78 MW Phase 1 of the plant was completed within three months.

Unlike fossil fuel based technologies, solar power does not lead to any harmful emissions during operation, but the production of the panels leads to some amount of pollution.

The energy payback time of a power generating system is the time required to generate as much energy as was consumed during production of the system. In 2000 the energy payback time of PV systems was estimated as 8 to 11 years and in 2006 this was estimated to be 1.5 to 3.5 years for crystalline silicon PV systems and 1–1.5 years for thin film technologies (S. Europe).

Another economic measure, closely related to the energy payback time, is the energy returned on energy invested (EROEI) or energy return on investment (EROI), which is the ratio of electricity generated divided by the energy required to build and maintain the equipment. (This is not the same as the economic return on investment (ROI), which varies according to local energy prices, subsidies available and metering techniques.) With lifetimes of at least 30 years, the EROEI of PV systems are in the range of 10 to 30, thus generating enough energy over their lifetimes to reproduce themselves many times (6-31 reproductions) depending on what type of material, balance of system (BOS), and the geographic location of the system.

One issue that has often raised concerns is the use of cadmium in cadmium telluride solar cells (CdTe is only used in a few types of PV panels). Cadmium in its metallic form is a toxic substance that has the tendency to accumulate in ecological food chains. The amount of cadmium used in thin-film PV modules is relatively small (5-10 g/m^{2}) and with proper emission control techniques in place the cadmium emissions from module production can be almost zero. Current PV technologies lead to cadmium emissions of 0.3-0.9 microgram/kWh over the whole life-cycle. Most of these emissions actually arise through the use of coal power for the manufacturing of the modules, and coal and lignite combustion leads to much higher emissions of cadmium. Life-cycle cadmium emissions from coal is 3.1 microgram/kWh, lignite 6.2, and natural gas 0.2 microgram/kWh. Note that if electricity produced by photovoltaic panels were used to manufacture the modules instead of electricity from burning coal, cadmium emissions from coal power usage in the manufacturing process could be entirely eliminated.

Solar power plants require large amounts of land. According to the Bureau of Land Management, there are twenty proposals to use in total about 180 square miles of public land in California. If all twenty proposed projects were built, they would total 7,387 megawatts. The requirement for so much land has spurred efforts to encourage solar facilities to be built on already-disturbed lands, and the Department of Interior identified Solar Energy Zones that it judges to contain lower value habitat where solar development would have less of an impact on ecosystems. Sensitive wildlife impacted by large solar facility plans include the desert tortoise, Mohave Ground Squirrel, Mojave fringe-toed lizard, and desert bighorn sheep.

In the United States, some of the land in the eastern portion of the Mojave Desert is to be preserved, but the solar industry has mainly expressed interest in areas of the western desert, "where the sun burns hotter and there is easier access to transmission lines", said Kenn J. Arnecke of FPL Energy, a sentiment shared by many executives in the industry.

=== Biofuels production ===
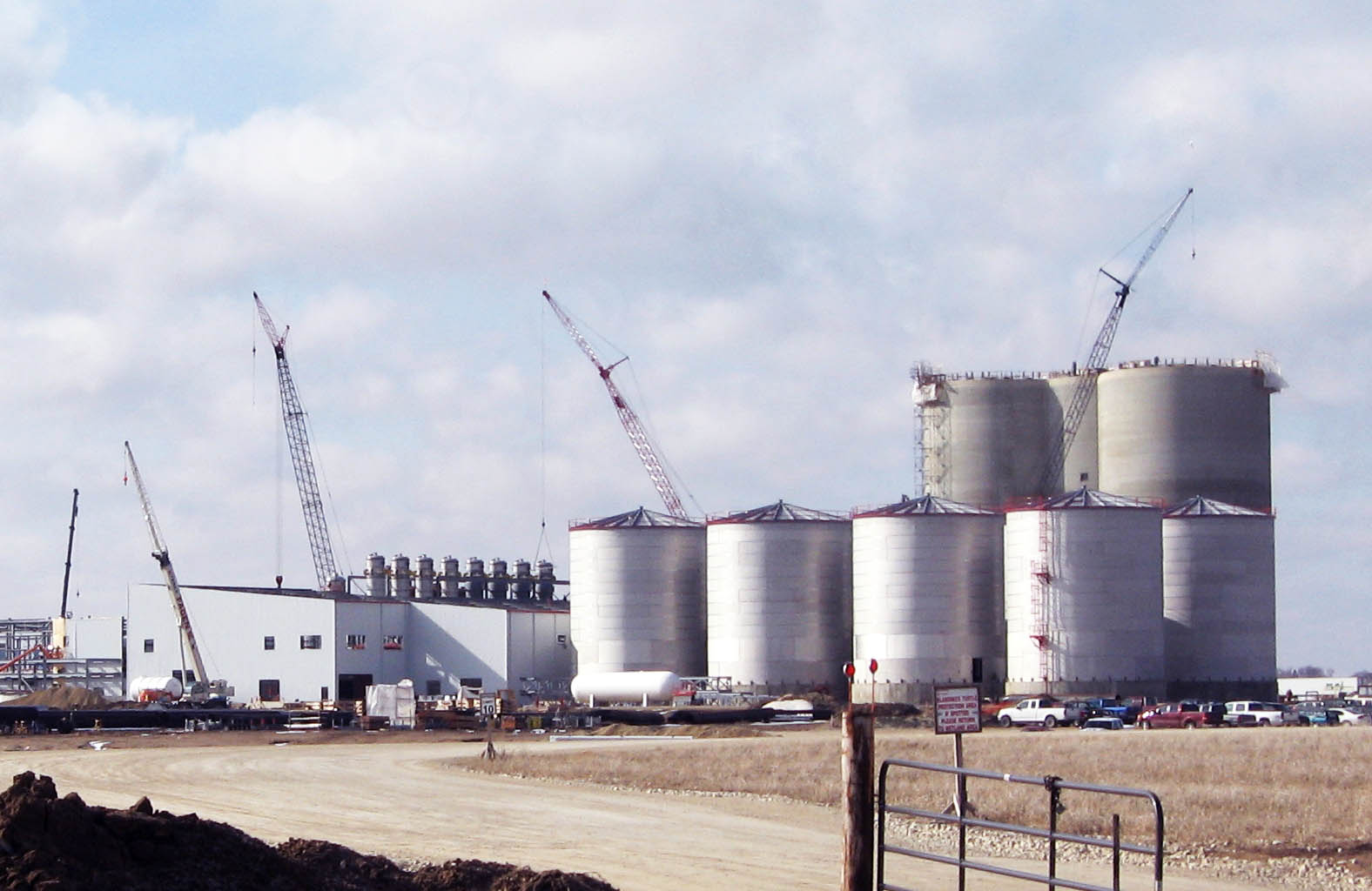
An ethanol fuel plant under construction, Butler County, Iowa

Biofuel production has increased in recent years. Some commodities like maize (corn), sugar cane or vegetable oil can be used either as food, feed, or to make biofuels. The Food vs. fuel debate is the dilemma regarding the risk of diverting farmland or crops for biofuels production to the detriment of the food supply. The biofuel and food price debate involves wide-ranging views, and is a long-standing, controversial one in the literature. There is disagreement about the significance of the issue, what is causing it, and what can or should be done to remedy the situation. This complexity and uncertainty is due to the large number of impacts and feedback loops that can positively or negatively affect the price system. Moreover, the relative strengths of these positive and negative impacts vary in the short and long terms, and involve delayed effects. The academic side of the debate is also blurred by the use of different economic models and competing forms of statistical analysis.

According to the International Energy Agency, new biofuels technologies being developed today, notably cellulosic ethanol, could allow biofuels to play a much bigger role in the future than previously thought. Cellulosic ethanol can be made from plant matter composed primarily of inedible cellulose fibers that form the stems and branches of most plants. Crop residues (such as corn stalks, wheat straw and rice straw), wood waste, and municipal solid waste are potential sources of cellulosic biomass. Dedicated energy crops, such as switchgrass, are also promising cellulose sources that can be sustainably produced in many regions of the United States.

The ethanol and biodiesel production industries also create jobs in plant construction, operations, and maintenance, mostly in rural communities. According to the Renewable Fuels Association, the ethanol industry created almost 154,000 U.S. jobs in 2005 alone, boosting household income by $5.7 billion. It also contributed about $3.5 billion in tax revenues at the local, state, and federal levels.

Biofuels are different from fossil fuels in regard to carbon emissions being short term, but are similar to fossil fuels in that biofuels contribute to air pollution. Burning produces airborne carbon particulates, carbon monoxide and nitrous oxides. The WHO estimates 3.7 million premature deaths worldwide in 2012 due to air pollution.

=== Wind farms ===
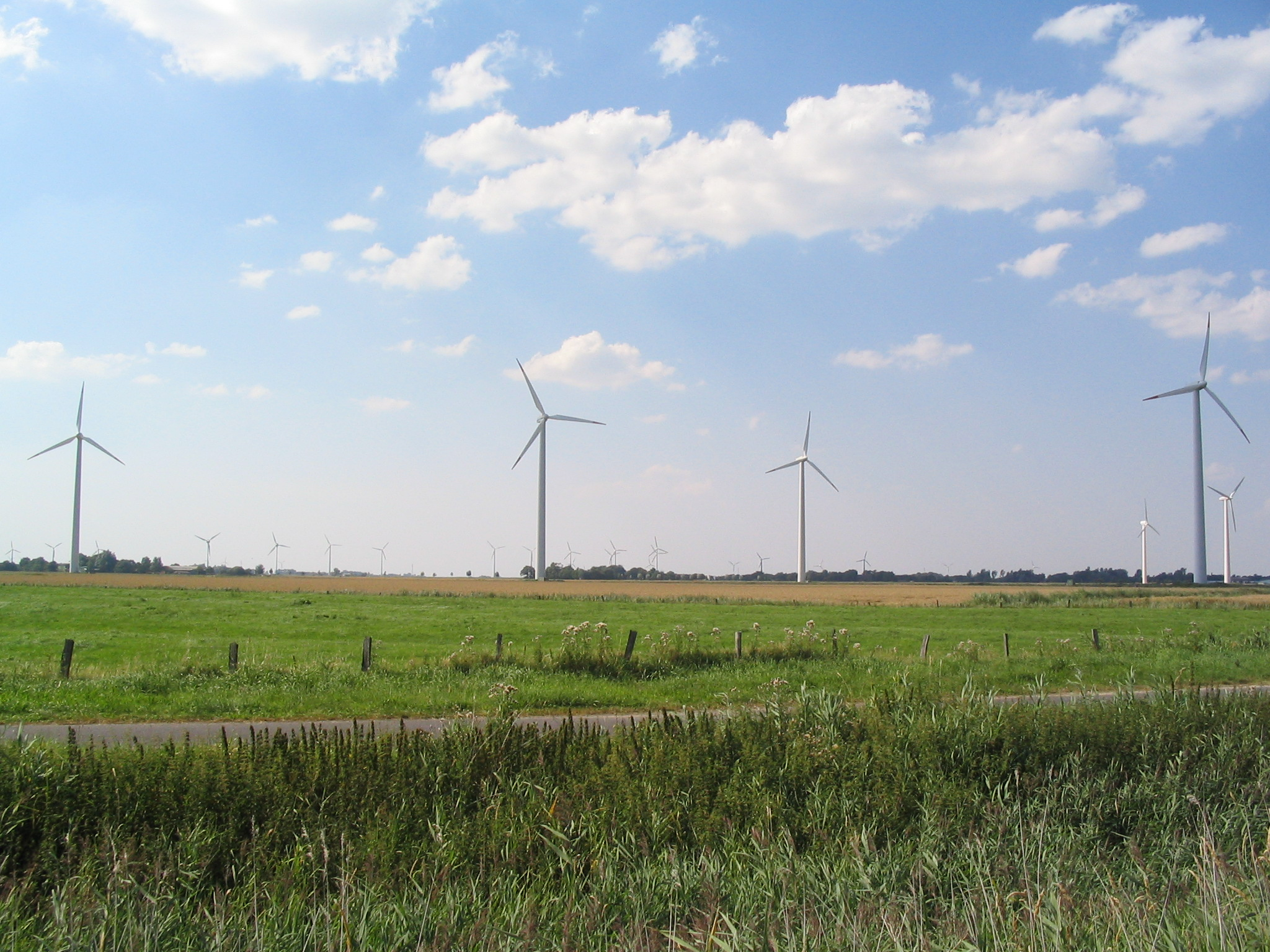
Wind power is a common renewable energy source

Mark Diesendorf, formerly Professor of Environmental Science at the University of Technology, Sydney and a principal research scientist with CSIRO has summarised some of the benefits of onshore wind farms as follows.

A wind farm, when installed on agricultural land, has one of the lowest environmental impacts of all energy sources:

- It occupies less land area per kilowatt-hour (kWh) of electricity generated than any other energy conversion system, apart from rooftop solar energy, and is compatible with grazing and crops.
- It generates the energy used in its construction in just 3 months of operation, yet its operational lifetime is 20–25 years.
- Greenhouse gas emissions and air pollution produced by its construction are very tiny and declining. There are no emissions or pollution produced by its operation.
- In substituting for load following natural gas plants [...] wind power produces a net decrease in greenhouse gas emissions and air pollution, and a net increase in biodiversity.
- Large wind turbines are almost silent and rotate so slowly (in terms of revolutions per minute) that they are rarely a bird strike hazard.

— Dissent, no. 13, Summer 2003/04, pp.43–48

Onshore wind farms can have a significant visual impact and impact on the landscape. Their network of turbines, access roads, transmission lines, and substations can result in "energy sprawl". Due to a very low surface power density and spacing requirements, wind farms typically need to be spread over more land than other power stations. They also need to be built away from urban areas, which can lead to "industrialization of the countryside". A report by the Mountaineering Council of Scotland concluded that wind farms harmed tourism in areas known for natural landscapes and panoramic views.

Onshore wind farms can cause habitat loss and habitat fragmentation for some wildlife. Some offshore wind farms in Europe are in areas heavily used by seabirds, and studies have found very few bird collisions. Improvements in wind turbine design, including a much slower rate of rotation of the blades and a smooth tower base instead of perchable lattice towers, have helped reduce bird deaths at wind farms. However older smaller wind turbines may be hazardous to birds. Birds are severely impacted by fossil fuel energy; examples include birds dying from exposure to oil spills, habitat loss from acid rain and mountaintop removal coal mining, and mercury poisoning.

In several cases, wind farm construction near wetlands has been linked to bog landslides that have polluted rivers, such as at Derrybrien and Meenbog in Ireland.

==== Community debate about wind farms ====
Acceptance of wind and solar facilities in one's community is stronger among Democrats (blue), while acceptance of nuclear power plants is stronger among Republicans (red).

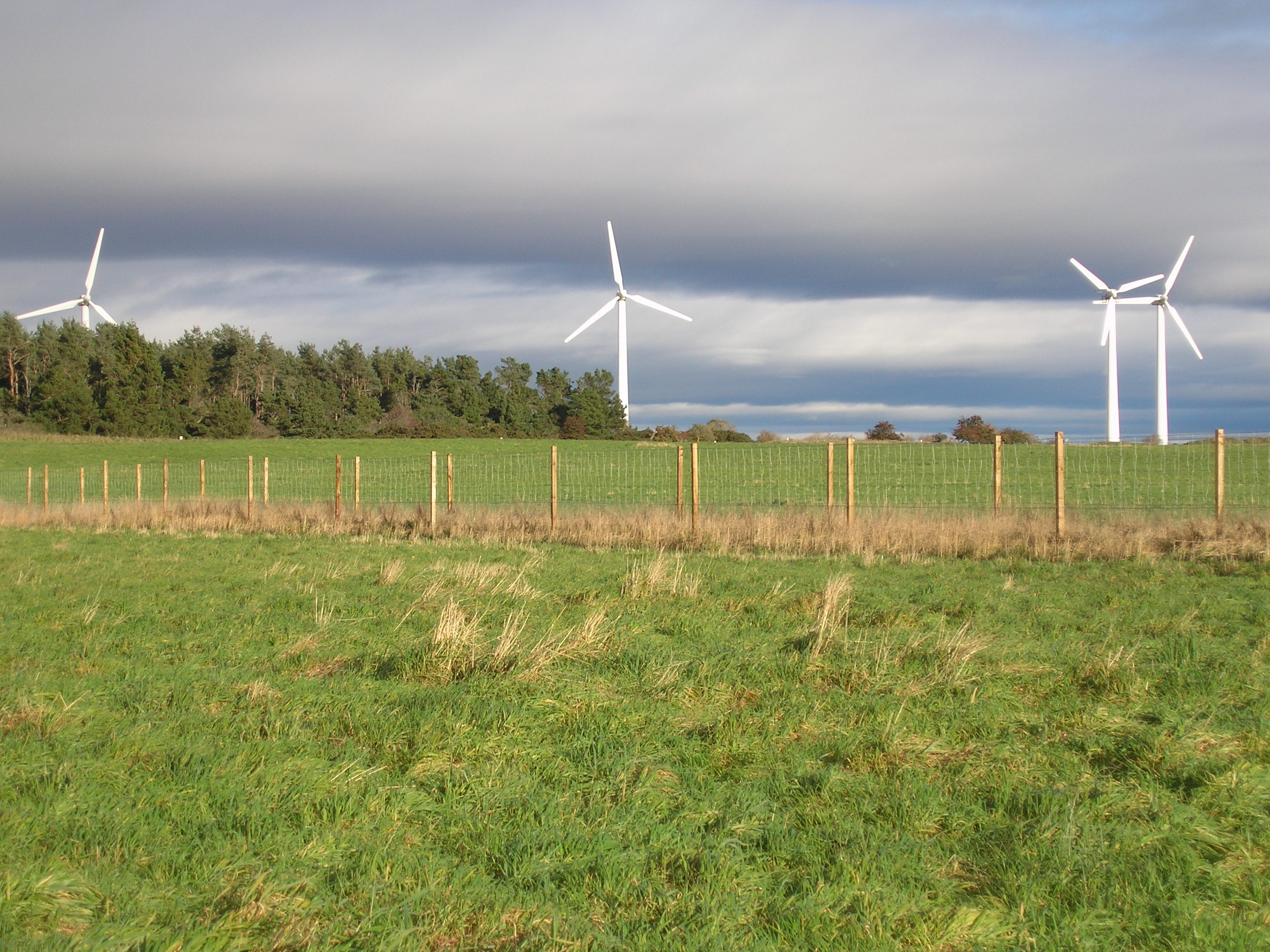
The wind turbines at Findhorn Ecovillage, which make the community a net exporter of electricity

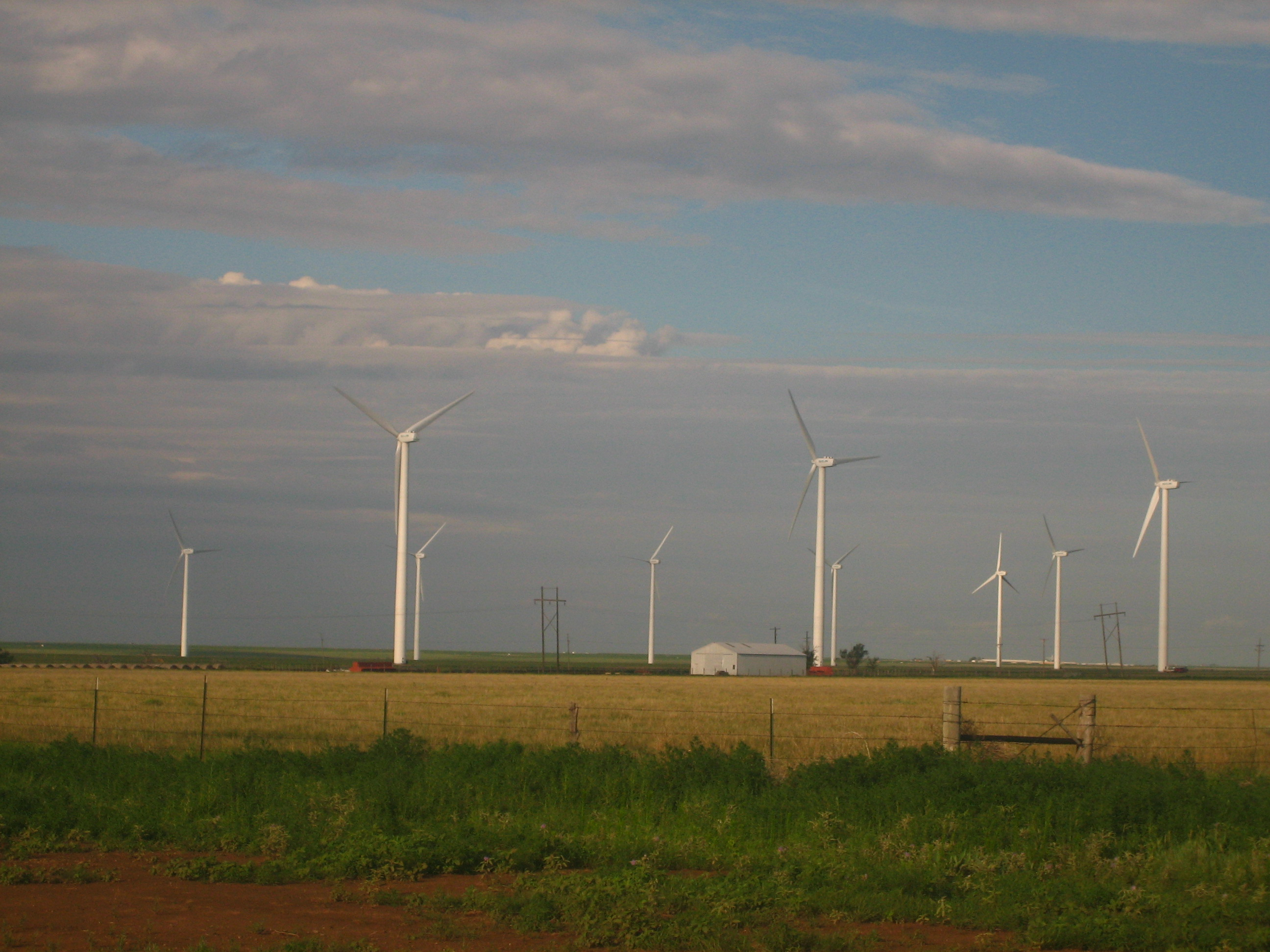
U.S. landowners typically receive $3,000 to $5,000 per year in rental income from each wind turbine, while farmers continue to grow crops or graze cattle up to the foot of the turbines.

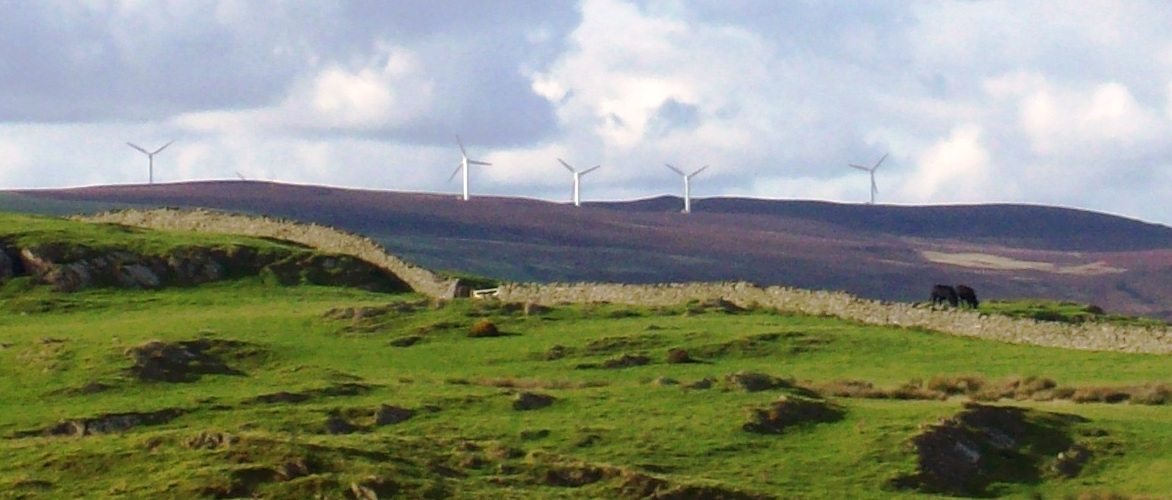
Wind turbines such as these, in Cumbria, England, have been opposed for a number of reasons, including aesthetics, by some sectors of the population.

There have been concerns relating to the visual and other impacts of some wind farms, with local residents sometimes fighting or blocking construction. Some of these concerns have been dismissed as "not in my back yard" (NIMBY) opposition. Certain wind farms have been opposed by residents, local councils and national trusts for their potential harmful impact on protected scenic areas, archaeological landscapes, tourism and cultural heritage. In the US, the Massachusetts Cape Wind project was delayed for years partly because of aesthetic concerns. Elsewhere, there are concerns that some installations can negatively affect TV and radio reception and Doppler weather radar, as well as produce excessive sound and vibration levels leading to a decrease in property values. Potential broadcast-reception solutions include predictive interference modeling as a component of site selection.

Residents in other areas have been more positive and there are community wind farm developments. According to a town councillor, the overwhelming majority of locals believe that the Ardrossan Wind Farm in Scotland has enhanced the area.

A starting point for better understanding community concerns about wind farms is often through public outreach initiatives (e.g., surveys, town hall meetings) to clarify the nature of concerns. Scott Victor Valentine (2011) said that community concerns over wind power projects have been shown to be based more on people's perception rather than fact. According to Valentine, in tourist areas, there is a perception that the siting of wind farms will adversely affect tourism, but surveys conducted in tourist areas in Germany, Belgium and Scotland showed this is not the case. Similarly, according to Valentine, concerns over wind turbine noise, shadow flicker, and bird life threats are not supported by data. He says the difficulty is that the general public often does not have ready access to information needed to assess the pros and cons of wind power developments. However, even where the general public supports wind power in principle and is well informed, there are often important qualifications around the building of wind farms (i.e. providing mitigation of development impacts on local ecology and assets).

According to Valentine, the media often fails to give all the information the public needs to effectively evaluate the merits of a wind farm. Moreover, misinformation about wind power may be propagated by the fossil fuel industry, or other special interest groups. He says planners and policymakers can mitigate some public opposition by providing the community with comprehensive information, which may also lead to enhanced support for a project.

Valentine says public perceptions generally improve after wind farms become operational. Surveys within communities that host wind farms in the United Kingdom, France, the United States and Finland showed wind farms which are properly planned and sited can gain support. He says wind farms that have been well-planned to reduce social and environmental problems, have been shown to positively influence wind power perceptions. Support is enhanced when the community is offered investment opportunities and involvement in the wind power development. Many wind power companies work with local communities to reduce environmental and other concerns associated with particular wind farms. Appropriate government consultation, planning and approval procedures also help to minimize environmental risks. Some people may still object to wind farms. The Australia Institute says their concerns should be weighed against the need to address the threats posed by climate change and the opinions of the broader community.

In other cases there is direct community ownership of wind farms. In Germany, hundreds of thousands of people have invested in citizens' wind farms and thousands of small and medium-sized enterprises are running successful businesses in a sector that in 2008 employed 90,000 people and generated 8 percent of Germany's electricity. Wind power has gained very high social acceptance in Germany. Surveys of public attitudes across Europe and in many other countries show strong public support for wind power.

Opinion on increase in number of wind farms, 2010 Harris Poll
	U.S.	Great Britain	France	Italy	Spain	Germany
	%	%	%	%	%	%
Strongly oppose	3	6	6	2	2	4
Oppose more than favour	9	12	16	11	9	14
Favour more than oppose	37	44	44	38	37	42
Strongly favour	50	38	33	49	53	40

In America, wind projects are reported to boost local tax bases, helping to pay for schools, roads and hospitals. Wind projects also revitalize the economy of rural communities by providing steady income to farmers and other landowners.

The Intrepid Wind Farm, in Iowa, is an example of one wind farm where the environmental impact of the project has been minimized through consultation and co-operation:

"Making sure the wind farm made as gentle an environmental impact as possible was an important consideration. Therefore, when MidAmerican first began planning the Intrepid site, they worked closely with a number of state and national environmental groups. Using input from such diverse groups as the Iowa Department of Natural Resources, the Nature Conservancy, Iowa State University, the U.S. Fish and Wildlife Service, the Iowa Natural Heritage Foundation, and the Iowa Chapter of the Sierra Club, MidAmerican created a statewide map of areas in the proposed region that contained specific bird populations or habitats. Those areas were then avoided as site planning got underway in earnest. In order to minimize the wind farm's environmental impact even further, MidAmerican also worked in conjunction with the United States Army Corps of Engineers, to secure all necessary permits related to any potential risk to wetlands in the area. Regular inspections are also conducted to make certain that the wind farm is causing no adverse environmental impact to the region."

Other examples include:

- On 12 January 2004, it was reported that the Center for Biological Diversity filed a lawsuit against wind farm owners for killing tens of thousands of birds at the Altamonte Pass Wind Resource Area near San Francisco, California. In February 2008, a state appeals court upheld an earlier ruling that rejected the lawsuit.
- 21 January 2005: Three wind turbines on the island of Gigha in Scotland generate up to 675 kW of power. Revenue is produced by selling the electricity to the grid via an intermediary called Green Energy UK. Gigha residents control the whole project and profits are reinvested in the community. Local residents call the turbines "The Three Dancing Ladies".
- On 7 December 2007, it was reported that some environmentalists opposed a plan to build a wind farm in western Maryland But other local environmentalists say that the environmental effects of wind farms "pale in comparison to coal-burning generators, which add to global warming and lead to acid rain" that is killing trees in the same area.
- On 4 February 2008, according to British Ministry of Defence turbines create a hole in radar coverage so that aircraft flying overhead are not detectable. In written evidence, Squadron Leader Chris Breedon said: "This obscuration occurs regardless of the height of the aircraft, of the radar and of the turbine."
- A 16 April 2008 article in the Pittsburgh Post-Gazette said that three different environmental organizations had raised objections to a proposed wind farm at Shaffer Mountain in northeastern Somerset County, Pennsylvania, because the wind farm would be a threat to the Indiana bat, which is listed as an endangered species.
- 25 July 2008: The Australian Hepburn Wind Project is a proposed wind farm, which will be the first Australian community-owned wind farm. The initiative emerged because the community felt that the state and federal governments were not doing enough to address climate change.
- 12 August 2008: The Ardrossan Wind Farm in Scotland has been "overwhelmingly accepted by local people". Instead of spoiling the landscape, they believe it has enhanced the area: "The turbines are impressive looking, bring a calming effect to the town and, contrary to the belief that they would be noisy, we have found them to be silent workhorses".
- 22 March 2009: Some rural communities in Alberta, Canada, want wind power companies to be allowed to develop wind farms on leased Crown land.
- 28 April 2009: After the McGuinty government opposed calls for a moratorium on the construction of new turbines in Ontario, several protests took place around the province, especially at Queen's Park in Toronto. Residents insist that more studies take place before continuing construction of the devices in their communities.
- In March 2010, the Toronto Renewable Energy Co-operative (TREC), incorporated in 1998, began organizing a new co-operative called "The Lakewind Project". Its initial project, WindShare, completed in 2002 on the grounds of Exhibition Place in central downtown Toronto, was the first wind turbine installed in a major North American urban city centre, and the first community-owned wind power project in Ontario.
- 20 July 2023 Nick Cater released a documentary showing how wind turbine blades are left abandoned in the forests of Chalumbin in Queensland on the site of a proposed large scale wind farm, and discussed the difficulty of recycling them and the pollution caused as a result.

== Longevity issues ==
Even though a source of renewable energy may last for billions of years, renewable energy infrastructure, like hydroelectric dams, will not last forever, and must be removed and replaced at some point. Events like the shifting of riverbeds, or changing weather patterns could potentially alter or even halt the function of hydroelectric dams, lowering the amount of time they are available to generate electricity. A reservoirs capacity may also be affected by silting which may not be cost-effective to remove.

Decommissioning hydroelectric dams is increasingly being recognized as necessary where maintenance becomes too costly or ecological damage is severe, as seen in recent projects like the removal of the Klamath River dams in the United States.

Wind turbines suffer from wear and fatigue and are typically scheduled to last about 20–25 years before being replaced, often by much taller, more efficient units. Turbine blades, primarily made of fiberglass, currently pose recycling challenges, with many ending up in landfills, though efforts are underway to improve blade recycling technologies.

Some have claimed that geothermal being a renewable energy source depends on the rate of extraction being slow enough such that depletion does not occur. If depletion does occur, the temperature can regenerate if given a long period of non-use.

The government of Iceland states: "It should be stressed that the geothermal resource is not strictly renewable in the same sense as the hydro resource." It estimates that Iceland's geothermal energy could provide 1700 MW for over 100 years, compared to the current production of 140 MW. Radioactive elements in the Earth's crust continuously decay, replenishing the heat. The International Energy Agency classifies geothermal power as renewable. Geothermal power in Iceland is developed in a stepwise development method to ensure that it is sustainable instead of excessive, which would deplete the resource.

== Diversification ==
The U.S. electric power industry now relies on large, central power stations, including coal, natural gas, nuclear, and hydropower plants that together generate more than 95% of the nation's electricity. Over the next few decades uses of renewable energy could help to diversify the nation's bulk power supply. In 2016 renewable hydro, solar, wind, geothermal and biomass produced 39% of California's electricity.

Although most of today's electricity comes from large, central-station power plants, renewable energy technologies offer a range of options for generating electricity nearer to where it is needed, saving on the cost of transmitting and distributing power and improving the overall efficiency and reliability of the system.

Improving energy efficiency represents the most immediate and often the most cost-effective way to reduce oil dependence, improve energy security, and reduce the health and environmental impact of the energy system. By reducing the total energy requirements of the economy, improved energy efficiency could make increased reliance on renewable energy sources more practical and affordable.

== Institutionalized barriers and choice awareness theory ==
Existing organizations and conservative political groups are disposed to keep renewable energy proposals out of the agenda at many levels. Most Republicans do not support renewable energy investment because their framework is built on staying with current energy sources while promoting national drilling to reduce dependence on imports. In contrast, progressives and libertarians tend to support renewable energy by encouraging job growth, national investment and tax incentives. Thus, polarized organizational frameworks that shape industrial and governmental policies for renewable energy tend to create barriers for implementing renewable energy.

According to an article by Henrik Lund, the theory of Choice Awareness seeks to understand and explain why the descriptions of the best alternatives do not develop independently and what can be done about it. The theory argues that public participation, and hence the awareness of choices, has been an important factor in successful decision-making processes Choice Awareness theory emphasizes the fact that different organizations see things differently and that current organizational interests hinder passing renewable energy policies. Given these conditions leaves the public with a situation of no choice. Consequently, this leaves the general public in a state to abide by conventional energy sources such as coal and oil.

In a broad sense most individuals, especially those that do not engage in public discourse of current economic policies, have little to no awareness of renewable energy. Enlightening communities on the socioeconomic implications of fossil fuel use is a potent mode of rhetoric that can promote the implementation of renewable energy sources. Transparent local planning also proves useful in public discourse when used to determine the location of wind farms in communities supporting renewable energy. According to an article by John Barry et al., a crucial factor communities need to engage discourse on is the principle of "assumption of and imperative towards consensus." This principle claims that a community cannot neglect its energy or climate change responsibilities, and that it must do its part in helping to decrease carbon emissions through renewable energy reformation. Hence, communities that continually engage in mutual learning and discourse by conflict resolution will help progress renewable energy.

== Nuclear power proposed as renewable energy ==
Legislative definitions of renewable energy, used when determining energy projects eligible for subsidies or tax breaks, usually exclude conventional nuclear reactor designs. Physicist Bernard Cohen elucidated in 1983 that uranium dissolved in seawater, when used in Breeder reactors (which are reactors that "breed" more fissile nuclear fuel than they consume from base fertile material) is effectively inexhaustible, with the seawater bearing uranium constantly replenished by river erosion carrying more uranium into the sea, and could therefore be considered a renewable source of energy.

In 1987, the World Commission on Environment and Development (WCED), an organization independent from, but created by, the United Nations, published Our Common Future, in which breeder reactors, and, when it is developed, fusion power are both classified within the same category as conventional renewable energy sources, such as solar and falling water.

== See also ==
- Environmental impact of renewable energy
- Environmental effects of wind power
- Fossil fuel phase-out – Gradual reduction of the use and production of fossil fuels
- Nuclear power debate – Controversy over the use of nuclear power
- Renewable energy commercialization – Deployment of technologies harnessing easily replenished natural resources
- Energy transition – Significant structural change in an energy system
- International Renewable Energy Agency – International organization
- Lists about renewable energy
- Renewable energy in the European Union
- Renewable energy power station – Energy collected from renewable resources
- Sustainable energy – Energy that responsibly meets social, economic, and environmental needs
- Low-carbon power – Power produced with lower carbon dioxide emissions
