= Sustainable community energy system =

A sustainable community energy system is an integrated approach to supplying a local community with its energy requirements from renewable energy or high-efficiency co-generation energy sources. The approach can be seen as a development of the distributed generation concept.

Such systems are based on a combination of district heating, district cooling, plus 'electricity generation islands' that are interlinked via a private wire electricity system (largely bypassing the normal power grid to cut transmission losses and charges, as well as increasing the robustness of the system). The surplus from one generating island can therefore be used to make up the deficit at another.

== Energy communities ==
Energy communities represent a promising approach designed to encourage localized generation and utilization of energy resources, crucial for achieving the objectives of the ongoing energy transition. This emerging concept not only facilitates the transition towards sustainable energy but also encourages active engagement from community members. They are recognized as an integral part of creating a sustainable energy system by the European Union, which also included them in the Clean Energy Package and other energy regulations, such as the Renewable Energy Directive.

Energy communities are any collaboration of citizens and other entities, such as municipalities, companies, energy providers, network operators, NGOs, etc., with the joint aim to contribute to energy system transformation by involving multiple actors in a participatory manner, and by aiming to create benefits for all involved parties (and potentially for society at large).

The benefits of energy communities vary. Most commonly, they are associated with the environmental benefits and benefits for their members, which are often linked to financial savings. Additionally, they also benefit the larger society with the promotion of sustainable energy practices and active citizen participation. Local communities also benefit from energy communities, for example by creation of jobs.

In 2023, the number of energy community sites in Europe alone reached approximately 3,500. This trend has also gained momentum globally, with similar initiatives emerging in other regions. For instance, the United States has seen the establishment of around 100 sites, while New Zealand has initiated approximately 9 sites.

== United Kingdom ==
In the United Kingdom, the first sustainable community energy system was pioneered by Woking Borough Council, starting in 1991. The system uses traditional and phosphoric acid fuel cell co-generation plants, thermal storage, heat fired absorption cooling and photovoltaics, to supply both residential and non-residential customers, as well as the Council's own facilities. By end of 2005 there were over 60 generating islands in the borough.

Despite the investment in the plant, the system delivers cheaper energy than can be supplied from the traditional brown energy suppliers, helping to tackle fuel poverty. It is part of a plan to cut local carbon dioxide emissions by 80% by 2050. Their initiatives won the Council the Queen's Award for Enterprise in 2001.

== Germany ==
In 1997, people of Wildpoldsried, in some cases acting as individuals, began a series of projects that produce renewable energy. The first efforts were wind turbines and biomass digesters for cogeneration of heat and power. In the time since, new work has included a number of energy conservation projects, more wind and biomass use, small hydro plants, photovoltaic panels on private houses, and district heating. Tied to this are ecological flood control and wastewater systems.

Today, the effects of this are an unforeseen level of prosperity resulting in construction of nine new community buildings, including a school, gymnasium, and community hall, complete with solar panels. There are three companies operating four biogas digesters with a fifth under construction. There are seven windmills with two more on the way. One hundred and ninety private households are equipped with solar, which pays them dividends. The district heating network has 42 connections. There are three small hydro power plants. Wildpoldsried now produces 321 percent more energy than it needs and is generating 4.0 million Euro in annual revenue. At the same time, there has been a 65% reduction in the town's carbon footprint.

A further example is the Danish island of Samsø, which in 1997 won a national competition launched by the Danish Energy Agency to become the country's model renewable energy community within a decade. The island's 4,000 residents financed the project through a cooperative ownership structure, purchasing shares in 11 onshore and 10 offshore wind turbines and investing in four biomass fuelled district heating plants supplied by locally grown straw. By 2007, Samsø had become the first territory in the world certified as 100% self sufficient in renewable energy, producing more electricity than it consumed and supplying three quarters of its heating needs from biomass. The Samsø Energy Academy, established to coordinate the transition, continues to advise other communities internationally, and the island has set a further target of becoming entirely fossil-fuel-free, including transport, by 2030.

== See also ==
- Energy in the United Kingdom
- Soft energy path
- The Fourth Revolution: Energy
- 100% renewable energy
- Energiewende
