= Harvest Power =

American organics management company

- Type: Private
- Industry: Recycling, alternative energy, soil, mulch
- Founded: 2008
- Defunct: 2021
- Headquarters: Waltham, Massachusetts
- Area served: Canada and the United States
- Key people: Mark Weidman, CEO; Paul Sellew, founder
- Website: harvestpower.com

Harvest Power, Inc. was a privately held organics management company headquartered in Waltham, Massachusetts, United States that specializes in converting food waste and yard waste into biofuel, compost, mulch and fertilizer. In 2014 Fast Company named it one of the most innovative companies in the world. In August of 2020 Harvest Power Orlando ceased operations for unknown reasons and all assets were put up for sale; the company was dissolved in April 2021.

== History ==
The company was founded by Paul Sellew in 2008. It initially received venture funding from Kleiner Perkins Caufield & Byers and Waste Management, Inc., and later from True North Venture Partners, Industry Ventures, Generation Investment Management, DAG Ventures and others. As of February 2014, the company operated 40 facilities in North America including bioenergy facilities, yard waste drop-off and soil- and-mulch pick-up depots for landscapers, contractors and homeowners, and bagging facilities. In 2014 Kathleen Ligocki took the position of CEO of the company. Its revenue in 2013 was, according to Ligocki, $130 million. In 2015, the company was ranked by Waste360 as the 29th largest waste and recycling firm based on 2014 revenues.

== Approach ==
Harvest Power's services are cited as a model for a circular economy of converting food waste into energy and nutrient-rich soil products. Food waste specifically has been identified by cities and businesses as an untapped resource that – if diverted from landfills – can be used for clean energy and soil revitalization. As examples, New York City's strategy to build more digesters has been called the "brown energy movement", the Massachusetts Department of Energy Resources (DOER) set the goal to divert 450,000 tons of food waste a year from landfills and incinerators, and California and other states are co-digesting food waste at sewage treatment plants.

== Facilities ==
In 2013, Harvest Power began operations of three anaerobic digesters in North America. First, in Reedy Creek Improvement District of Orlando, Florida, food waste from Walt Disney World was an early input. As of September 2015, the facility was accepting 100 tons of food waste daily. The biogas produced by the facility fuels a 7-megawatt combined heat and power plant helping reduce waste going to landfills and reduce greenhouse gas emissions. In British Columbia, the company opened the largest commercial scale high-solids anaerobic digester in North America that processes food scraps mixed with yard trimmings from the lower mainland. The facility recycles food waste that the regional government Metro Vancouver ultimately banned from landfills in January 2015. Third, in London, Ontario, the company opened a food waste digester to serve food waste processors, supermarkets, restaurants, and other commercial generators.

In addition to bioenergy facilities, the company sold soils, mulches, and fertilizers at retail outlets such as Lowe's, The Home Depot, Walmart and independent garden centers.
