= 100Green =

British sustainable energy company

- Type: Utility company
- Industry: Sustainable energy
- Founded: 2001
- Headquarters: Ware, Hertfordshire
- Key people: Doug Stewart, CEO
- Products: Gas; Electricity
- Website: www.greenenergyuk.com

Green Energy (UK) Ltd, operating as 100Green, is a British independent-energy company based in Ware, Hertfordshire. It was established in 2001 by CEO Douglas Stewart. The company provides Ofgem-certified renewable electricity and green gas to domestic and business customers throughout Great Britain. It is currently the only energy supplier in the UK to offer 100% green gas.

100Green is distinct from Green Supplier Limited and Green Network Energy, which ceased trading in 2021.

== About ==
100Green offers 100% green gas to both domestic and business customers. It has a special exemption from Ofgem's price cap due to its commitment to renewable energy, which incurs higher operational costs. 100Green was the first private UK company to distribute free shares to its customers, a program that has since ended, but some customers remain as shareholders.

== Fuel mix ==
The EKO Tariff offered by 100Green has received independent certification from EKOenergy, a global non-profit ecolabel focused on renewable energy. This ecolabel signifies that the consumed energy meets extra sustainability and quality standards set by a network of environmental NGOs.

In January 2017, 100Green introduced the UK's first time-of-use tariff, TIDE (Time-of-Use, Interval, Dynamic, and Environmental). TIDE encourages customers to optimize their electricity consumption by utilizing electricity during periods of reduced demand when prices are more cost-effective, facilitated by using smart meters for electricity consumption.

== Generators ==
Before the formation of 100Green, a limited number of its 650 generators were active. These generators, approved by Ofgem, utilize diverse energy sources including waste, biomass, solar, small hydro, wind, combined heat and power (CHP), and anaerobic digestion. The gas supplied by 100Green is certified under the Green Gas Certification Scheme. The company focuses on purchasing only UK-sourced renewable electricity and green gas, excluding brown energy and nuclear from its offerings.

== Awards ==
- 100Green was awarded the Which? Eco Provider badge in 2021, 2022, and 2023, though not in 2024.
- 100Green was ranked No.1 'Best Buy' by Ethical Consumer Magazine, 2021 and continues to be ranked a top 'Best Buy' in 2023–2024.
- 100Green tops the Good Shopping Guide ratings table of ethical energy suppliers as of 2023, being just one of two suppliers to achieve the full ethical accreditation in 2023.
- 100Green was crowned 'Winner of Winners' in the Cisco Customer Kings competition, 2010
