= Environmental impact of wind power =

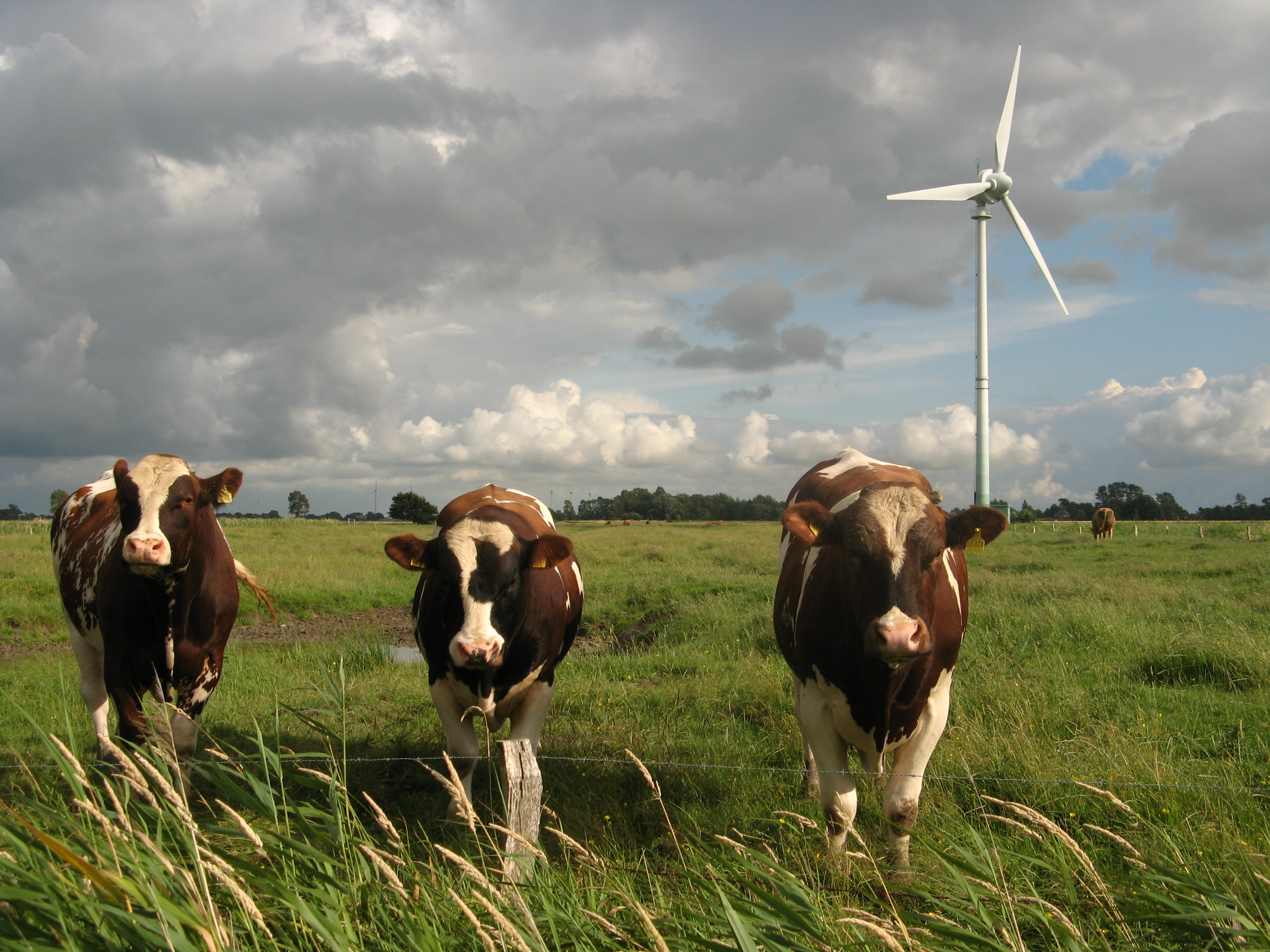
Livestock grazing near a wind turbine

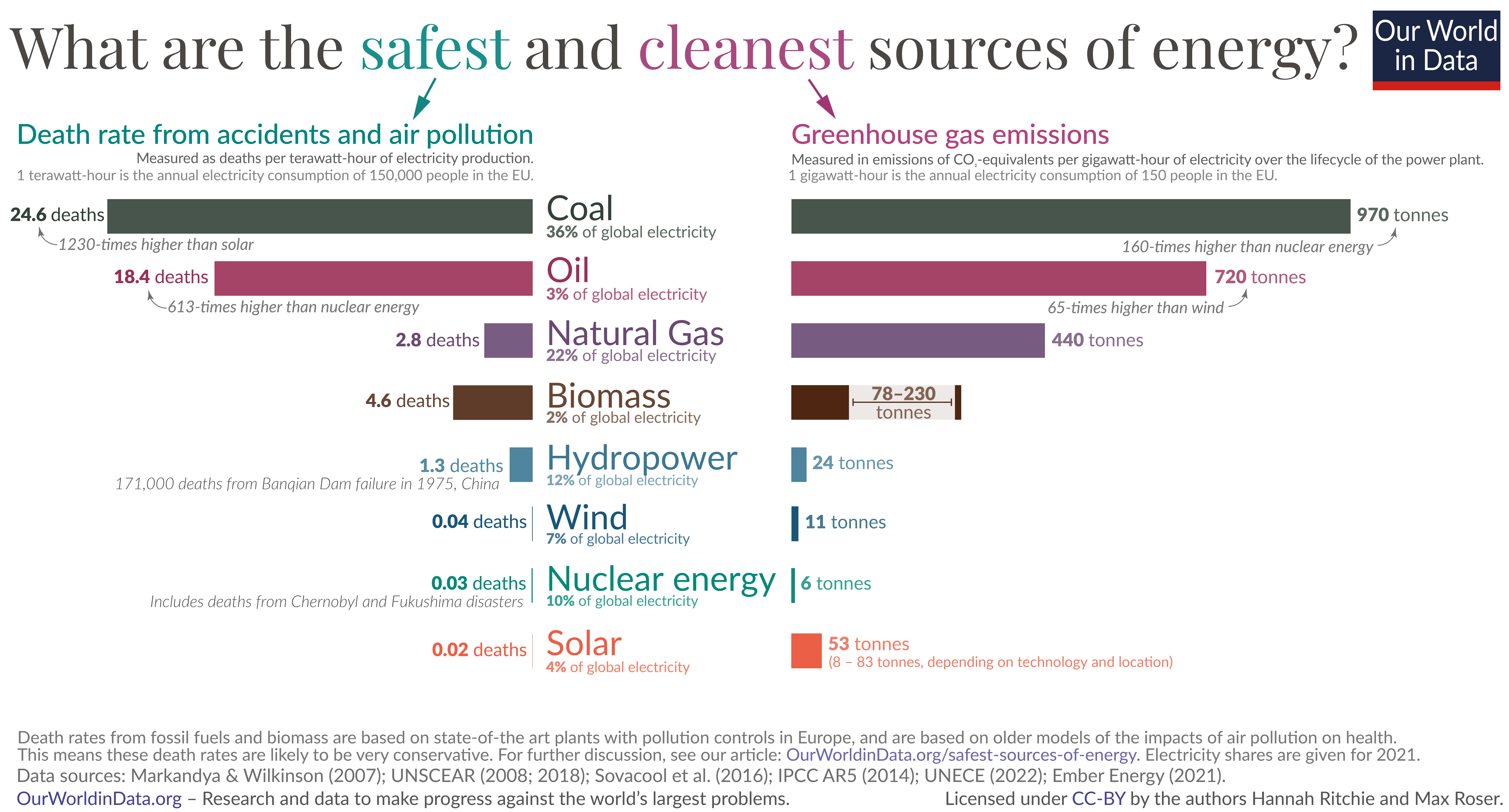
Per unit of energy, nuclear and wind power have minimal greenhouse emissions, and together with solar are the least deadly sources of energy.

The environmental impact of electricity generation from wind power is minor when compared to that of fossil fuel power. Wind power consumes no fuel, and emits no air pollution, unlike fossil fuels. Wind turbines have some of the lowest global warming potential per unit of electricity generated: far less greenhouse gas is emitted than for the average unit of electricity, so wind power helps limit climate change. Emissions from production of a turbine are recouped in less than a year of operation, as it replaces gas or coal power.

Onshore (on-land) wind farms can have a significant visual impact and impact on the landscape. Due to a very low surface power density and spacing requirements, wind farms typically need to be spread over more land than other power stations. Conflicts arise especially in scenic and culturally-important landscapes. Siting restrictions, such as setbacks, may be implemented to limit the impact. The land between the turbines and access roads can still be used for farming and grazing. Some wind farms are opposed for potentially spoiling protected scenic areas, archaeological landscapes and heritage sites.

Many wind turbine blades are made of fiberglass and some only had a lifetime of 10 to 20 years. Previously, there was no market for recycling these old blades, and they were commonly disposed of in landfills. Because blades are hollow, they take up a large volume compared to their mass. Since 2019, some landfill operators have begun requiring blades to be crushed before being landfilled. Blade end-of-life is complicated, and blades manufactured in the 2020s are more likely to be designed to be completely recyclable.

Wind turbines also generate noise. At a distance of 300 metres (980 ft) this may be around 45 dB, which is slightly louder than a refrigerator. At 1.5 km (1 mi) distance they become inaudible. Some people who live very close to wind turbines have reported negative health effects, but peer-reviewed research has generally not supported these claims. Pile-driving to construct non-floating wind farms is noisy underwater, but in operation offshore wind is much quieter than ships.

Habitat loss and fragmentation are the greatest potential impacts on wildlife of onshore wind farms, but the worldwide ecological impact is minimal. Thousands of birds and bats, including rare species, have been killed by wind turbine blades, though wind turbines are responsible for far fewer bird deaths than fossil-fueled power stations when climate change effects are included. The effects of wind turbines on birds can be mitigated with proper wildlife monitoring.

== Basic operational considerations ==
=== Pollution and effects on the electric grid ===
==== Pollution costs ====
Compared with other low-carbon power sources, wind turbines have one of the lowest global warming potentials per unit of electrical energy generated by any power source. According to the IPCC, in assessments of the life-cycle global warming potential of energy sources, wind turbines have a median value of between 15 and 11 (gCO_{2}eq/kWh) depending on whether offshore or onshore turbines are being assessed.

Wind power does not consume water for continuous operation and has near negligible emissions directly related to its electricity production. Wind turbines when isolated from the electric grid, produce negligible amounts of carbon dioxide, carbon monoxide, sulfur dioxide, nitrogen dioxide, mercury and radioactive waste when in operation, unlike fossil fuel sources and nuclear energy station fuel production, respectively.

Wind power externality costs are negligible compared to the cost of electricity generation.

=== Microplastic emissions ===
Wind turbine blades can emit microplastic particles due to erosion of protective coatings, as well as during maintenance and repair procedures. These emissions are relatively small compared to major resources of microplastics, such as tyre wear, textiles and paints. Improved protective coatings for wind turbine blades and optimized maintenance procedures can reduce the microparticle emission.

=== Rare-earth use ===
The production of powerful permanent magnets used in some wind turbines makes use of neodymium. Neodymium is used for two main reasons. The first is it reduces the total weight of turbines, and the second is reducing the usage and extraction of other raw materials. Pollution concerns associated with the extraction of this rare-earth element, which is primarily exported by China, have prompted government action in recent years, and international research attempts to refine the extraction process. Research is currently underway to reduce the amount of neodymium mining worldwide. There are several different proposed solutions, including extracting dymium from devices to be reclaimed, or replacing it with more abundant and environmentally friendly metals such as Cerium. Additionally, the large wind turbine manufacturer Enercon GmbH chose very early not to use permanent magnets for its direct drive turbines, to avoid responsibility for the adverse environmental impact of rare-earth mining.

The Kleinman Center for Energy Policy at the University of Pennsylvania (May 2021) reports that neodymium, a critical rare-earth element, is used in manufacturing permanent magnets for wind turbines, which helps improve their efficiency and reduce maintenance needs. With China holding over 95% of global Rare Earth Element (REE) production, there are significant environmental and geopolitical concerns. The extraction of REEs, expected to double in demand by 2035 due to renewable energy needs, presents environmental risks, including radioactive waste. Sustainable mining practices, supply diversification, and recycling innovations are being considered to manage the increased demand and environmental risks associated with REE production.

=== Material inputs ===
An International Energy Agency study projects the demand for mined resources such as lithium, graphite, cobalt, copper, nickel and rare earths will rise by four times by 2040 and notes insufficient supply of these materials to match demand imposed by expected large-scale deployments of decentralized technologies solar and wind power, and required grid upgrades. According to a 2018 study, significant increase of wind power would require 1000% increase in supply of these metals by 2060, requiring significant increase in mining operations.

=== Waste, recycling, repurposing ===
Modern wind turbine blades are made from plastic/fiberglass composite designs that provide a service lifetime of less than about 20 years. As of February 2018, there was no economical technology and market for recycling these old blades, and the most common disposal procedure is to truck them to landfills. Other options for disposing of the blades includes incinerating the material or grinding it up into powder, but both of these methods are not only expensive, but also inefficient and involves additional energy usage. Blade incineration can emit greenhouse gases if not recycled. A study of wind turbine blades in Canada found that "Incineration of blade waste increases GHG emissions in all provinces". Due to their hollow design for less weight, blades can take up an enormous volume compared to their mass, making road transport difficult, expensive, and dangerous due to wide turning berths, extra safety vehicles, and longer flatbed trucks.

Since many blades are still trashed, landfill operators have started requiring blades to be cut to pieces and sometimes crushed before they can be landfilled, which consumes further energy. However, as they can take a lot of weight they can be made into long lasting small bridges for walkers or cyclists. Along with ongoing development work to extend the generating efficiency and service life of newer turbines, blade recycling solutions continue to be pursued that are economical, energy efficient, and market scalable.

There may be as much as 45% additional waste resulting from processes that occur during the lifecycle of the turbine blades, and it is estimated that total annual blade waste of all countries may reach 2.9 million tons by 2050. In comparison, global solar photovoltaic cell waste is expected to reach about 78 million tons by 2050, and 750 million tons of fly ash waste was produced by coal power in 2022.

==== Recycling and repurposing ====
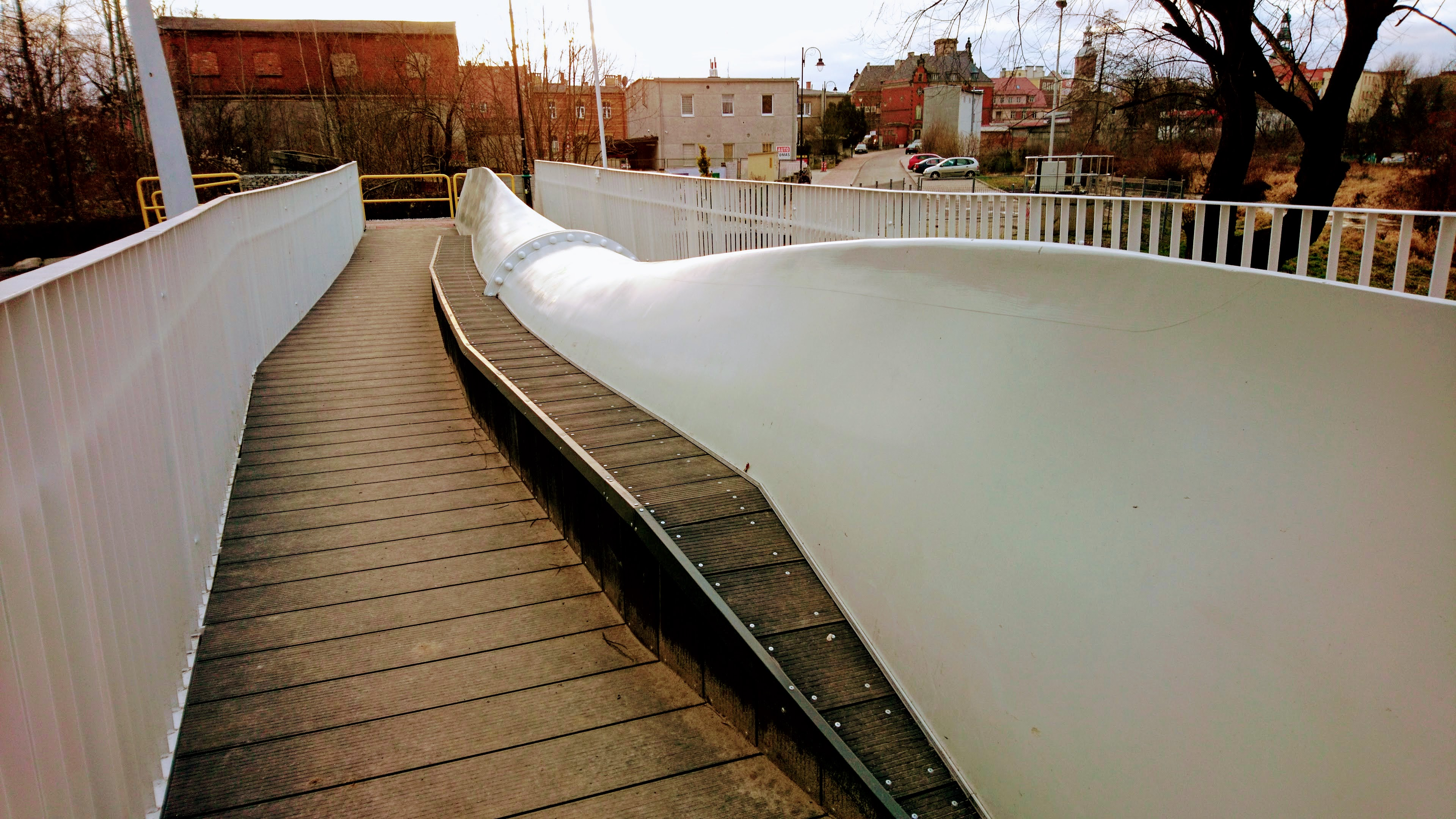
Footbridge in Poland made from a turbine blade

As much as 80% of the wind turbine structure can be recycled, though this does not include the foundation of the structure, which is typically made from reinforced concrete, or the blades. Alternatively, these components of the turbine structure that are not easily recycled into new turbines can still be repurposed and used in other ways.

The large volume of the turbine blades, while difficult to handle, is advantageous in repurposing the blades as playground structures, bike shelters and footbridges. Other recycling methods include creating pellets for waterproof boards and injectable plastics, as well as pyrolysis for producing paints, glues, and both cement and concrete. Carbon fiber blades can now be recycled, the fiber first being separated from the epoxy resin binder, then chopped into small particles. After the separation, the resin is used as a fuel source for the next materials to be processed. After pyrolysis, the resulting material can be further separated and the glass fibers extracted to be used in insulation or fiber reinforcement.

The blades may also be repurposed into building materials and structural components. Research indicates that turbine blades could successfully be repurposed as electrical transmission poles as their strength and structural stability was found to be comparable to the materials that are typically used. Sections of the blades have been adapted to create roofs for small houses and these structures meet the requirements of building codes and may prove to be a viable way to reuse blade materials without extensive processes needed to make the material usable. Components of the turbine could be reused by implementing segmentation, where the object is divided into different elements. Research on segmentation suggests that the resulting materials are better than conventional construction materials when measuring specific flexural stiffness and flexural strength.

Overall, there are several different avenues through which wind turbine components can be recycled, reused, or repurposed, all with their advantages and disadvantages, and there continues to be research conducted to determine more ways that the materials can be economically used. While various methods for recycling or repurposing the turbine blades have been proven effective, they have not been implemented on a large enough scale to adequately address the rapidly rising amounts of turbine blade waste being produced.

=== Alternative building materials ===
In addition to carbon fiber blades sometimes being installed due to lower weight and higher strength and durability compared to fiberglass-epoxy composites, there are wind turbines with a modular wooden structural support trunk, which is stronger, lighter, easier to recycle and transport, and more carbon-neutral than steel. These wooden towers would not need to be recycled as often as steel due to their fire-resistance and higher tolerance of metal-oxidizing chemicals. Other alternative building materials include recyclable polymers (thermoplastic, recyclable thermosets, polyurethane), bamboo, natural fiber composites, biodegradable resins, and bio-based carbon fibers.

Research on wind turbine materials also focuses on how to make the turbine blades more resistant to damage as this would extend their lifespan and reduce the replacement turnover (frequency of replacements). In addition to adapting the materials used in the blades to increase their resistance to damage, there are also potential methods of altering the turbine's activity during certain weather events in order to decrease any damage caused by wind or rain.

== Ecology ==
=== Land use ===
Wind power has low life-cycle surface power density of 1.84 W/m^{2} which is three orders of magnitude (10^{3} times, which is equivalent to 1,000x) less than nuclear or fossil fuel power and three times less than Photovoltaics.

Wind farms are often built on land that has already been impacted by land clearing. The vegetation clearing and ground disturbance required for wind farms are minimal compared with coal mines and coal-fired power stations. If wind farms are decommissioned, the landscape can be returned to its previous condition.

A study by the US National Renewable Energy Laboratory of US wind farms built between 2000 and 2009 found that, on average, 1.1 percent of the total wind farm area suffered surface disturbance, and 0.43 percent was permanently disturbed by wind power installations. On average, there were 63 hectares (160 acres) of total wind farm area per MW of capacity, but only 0.27 hectares (0.67 acres) of permanently disturbed area per MW of wind power capacity.

In the UK many prime wind farm sites – locations with the best average wind speeds – are in upland areas that are frequently covered by blanket bog. This type of habitat exists in areas of relatively high rainfall where large areas of land remain permanently sodden. Construction work may create a risk of disruption to peatland hydrology which could cause localised areas of peat within the area of a wind farm to dry out, disintegrate, and so release their stored carbon. At the same time, the warming climate which renewable energy schemes seek to mitigate could itself pose an existential threat to peatlands throughout the UK. A Scottish MEP campaigned for a moratorium on wind developments on peatlands saying that "Damaging the peat causes the release of more carbon dioxide than wind farms save". A 2014 report for the Northern Ireland Environment Agency noted that siting wind turbines on peatland could release considerable carbon dioxide from the peat, and also damage the peatland contributions to flood control and water quality: "The potential knock-on effects of using the peatland resource for wind turbines are considerable and it is arguable that the impacts on this facet of biodiversity will have the most noticeable and greatest financial implications for Northern Ireland." Wind farm construction near wetlands has been linked to several bog landslides in Ireland that have polluted rivers, such as at Derrybrien (2003) and Meenbog (2020). Such incidents could be prevented with stricter planning procedures and siting guidelines.

Wind-energy advocates contend that less than 1% of the land is used for foundations and access roads, the other 99% can still be used for farming. A wind turbine needs about 200–400 m^{2} for the foundation. With the increasing size of the wind turbine the relative size of the foundation decreases. Critics point out that on some locations in forests, the clearing of trees around tower bases may be necessary for installation sites on mountain ridges, such as in the northeastern U.S. This usually takes the clearing of 5,000 m^{2} per wind turbine.

During construction of wind farms in Scotland in 2007–2008, over 3.4 million trees were removed on 6202 acres of forest, out of which 31.5% have been replanted.

Turbines are not generally installed in urban areas. Buildings interfere with the wind, turbines must be sited a safe distance ("setback") from residences in case of failure, and the value of land is high. There are a few notable exceptions to this. The WindShare ExPlace wind turbine was erected in December 2002, on the grounds of Exhibition Place, in Toronto, Ontario, Canada. It was the first wind turbine installed in a major North American urban city centre. Steel Winds also has a 20 MW urban project south of Buffalo, New York. Both of these projects are in urban locations, but benefit from being on uninhabited lakeshore property.

In Greece, wind turbine sites have been installed "on mountain peaks, in forests, near archaeological sites, on islands, in protected habitats" and in highly populated tourist areas, causing disruption to hospitality business and protests of residents.

==== Livestock ====
The land can still be used for farming and cattle grazing. Livestock is unaffected by the presence of wind farms. International experience shows that livestock will "graze right up to the base of wind turbines and often use them as rubbing posts or for shade".

In 2014, a first of its kind veterinary study attempted to determine the effects of rearing livestock near a wind turbine, the study compared the health effects of a wind turbine on the development of two groups of growing geese, preliminary results found that geese raised within 50 meters of a wind turbine gained less weight and had a higher concentration of the stress hormone cortisol in their blood than geese at a distance of 500 meters.

Semi-domestic reindeer avoid the construction activity, but seem unaffected when the turbines are operating.

=== Impact on wildlife ===
Environmental assessments are routinely carried out for wind farm proposals, and potential impacts on the local environment (e.g. plants, animals, soils) are evaluated. Turbine locations and operations are often modified as part of the approval process to avoid or minimise impacts on threatened species and their habitats. Unavoidable impacts can be offset with conservation improvements of similar ecosystems which are unaffected by the proposal.

A research agenda from a coalition of researchers from universities, industry, and government, supported by the Atkinson Center for a Sustainable Future, suggests modeling the spatiotemporal patterns of migratory and residential wildlife with respect to geographic features and weather, to provide a basis for science-based decisions about where to site new wind projects. More specifically, it suggests:

- Use existing data on migratory and other movements of wildlife to develop predictive models of risk.
- Use new and emerging technologies, including radar, acoustics, and thermal imaging, to fill gaps in knowledge of wildlife movements.
- Identify specific species or sets of species most at risk in areas of high potential wind resources.

Wind turbines, like many other human activities and buildings, also increase the death rate of avian creatures such as birds and bats. A summary of the existing field studies compiled in 2010 from the National Wind Coordinating Collaborative identified fewer than 14 and typically less than four bird deaths per installed megawatt per year, but a wider variation in the number of bat deaths. Like other investigations, it concluded that some species (e.g. migrating bats and songbirds) are known to be harmed more than others and that factors such as turbine siting can be important. The National Renewable Energy Laboratory maintains a database of the scientific literature on the subject.

==== Birds ====
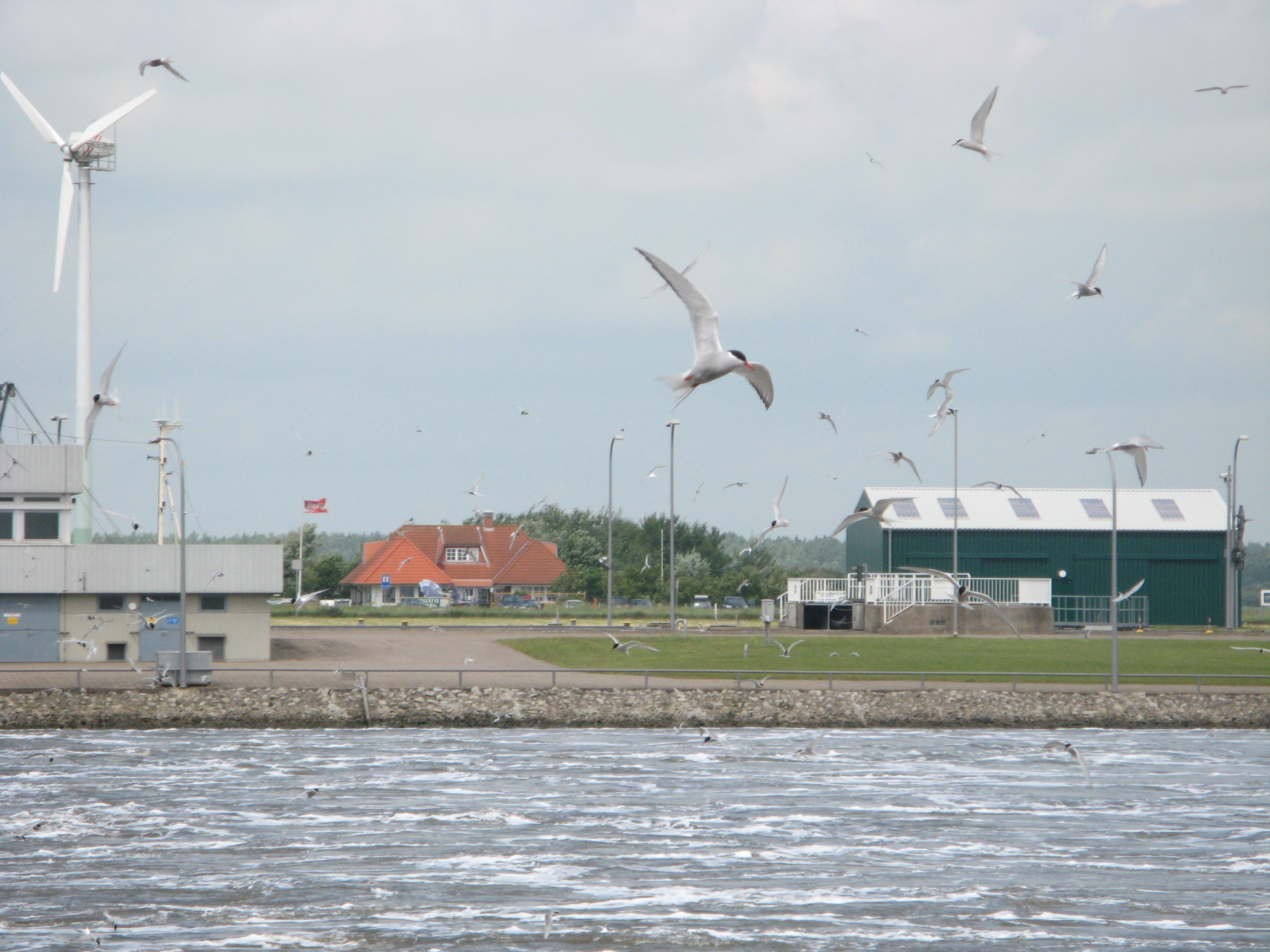
Arctic terns and a wind turbine at the Eider Barrage in Germany

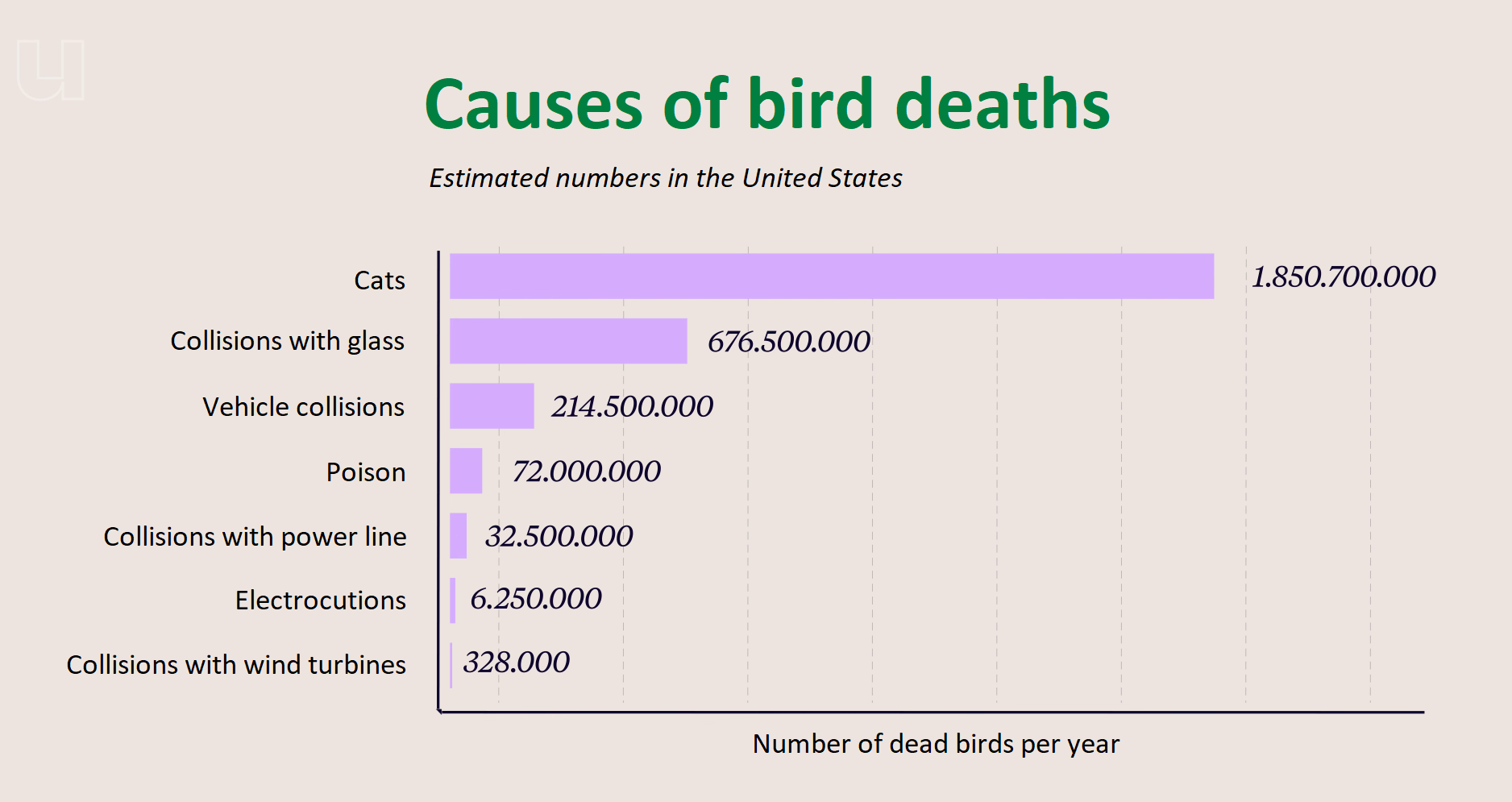
Collisions with wind turbines are a minor source of bird mortality compared to other human causes.

The impact of wind energy on birds, which can fly into turbines, or have their habitats degraded by wind development, is complex. Displacement is thought to be more of a threat to species than collisions. Habitat loss is highly variable among species.

Hundreds of thousands of birds, including raptors and migrants, are killed each year because of wind turbines and their power lines, but this is less than the number killed (or not born) because of fossil fuel (coal and gas) infrastructure. Wind farms are estimated to be responsible for losing less than 0.4 birds per gigawatt-hour (GWh) of electricity generated, compared to over 5 birds per GWh for fossil fueled power stations. As well as threatening extinction, one of the effects of climate change is to already cause a decline in bird population, and this is the main cause of bird loss from fossil power. A study comparing annually recorded bird populations in the United States from 2000 to 2020 to the spread of wind power infrastructure, found the presence of wind turbines had no significant effect on bird population numbers. This was directly compared to fracking infrastructure, whose presence causes a 15% decrease in the local bird populations.

On some important migration routes turbines are banned, or birds may alter their flight paths to avoid them. Biological surveys beforehand and correctly siting turbines is important, especially for birds of prey as they are slow to breed. Methods to help birds avoid turbines include painting of one of the turbine blades black, and making ultrasonic noise. Some approaching birds can be spotted, for example by avian radar, in time for turbines to be slowed to a speed which is safe for them. Wind farms may need more power lines, and lines may be made less damaging to compensate. Making permits for the number of birds (such as eagles) killed tradeable has been suggested, in order to save the most birds at the least cost.

==== Bats ====
Ecological surveys beforehand with full-spectrum detectors can ensure onshore wind turbines are sited to minimize the impact on bats, however as of 2024 more offshore bat research is needed. Bats may be injured by direct impact with turbine blades, towers, or transmission lines. Bats may also be killed when suddenly passing through a low air pressure region surrounding the turbine blade tips. The numbers of bats killed by existing onshore and near-shore facilities have troubled bat enthusiasts. Studies by the Bats and Wind Energy Cooperative show that bat fatalities can be reduced by stopping wind farm operations when wind speed is low during certain months, at times when bats are most active, and illuminating turbines with UV light is also a deterrent. Bats avoid radar transmitters, and placing microwave transmitters on wind turbine towers may reduce the number of bat collisions.

It is hypothesized that a portion of bat fatalities are attributed to the wind displacement caused by the wind turbine blades as they move through the air causing insects in the area to become disoriented making it a dense area of prey – an attractive hunting ground for bats. To combat this phenomenon, ultrasonic deterrents have been tested on select wind turbines and has been shown to reduce bat fatalities from collision and barotrauma. Testing of the ultrasonic deterrents has shown significantly reduced bat activity around wind turbines.

The types of wind turbines that tend to kill more bats are located near rivers or caves. Additionally, turbines with large, wide blades or blades that have less ground clearance tend to cause more fatalities. Wind turbines in the Appalachian ridgelines are noted to be particularly dangerous.

Each wind turbine is estimated to kill 6 to 20 bats per year. Bat deaths have increased significantly over the years as wind power expands, with 100,000 annual bat deaths occurring two decades ago in the United States. After 2021, this number has risen to 1.5 million annual deaths in the USA. Mortality, specifically in migratory birds and bats, seems to be increased in locations where wind patterns seem to facilitate both migration paths and energy production. As of 2024 many countries lack laws to protect bats.

==== Marine life ====
Wind farms designed to be more efficient from lack of airflow-impeding obstacles, offshore wind farms, have altered marine ecosystems by providing refuge from humans in the form of fishing-restricted areas due to safety concerns of moving blades. Interestingly, the regions of refuge are not directly at the location of the wind turbines but rather slightly closer to shore. As an example, new colonies of Blue Mussels in the North Sea fed by phytoplankton are a food source for other predators, namely fish and crabs, and further up the food chain, seals. Blue Mussels also reduce turbidity in the ocean water, making for greater underwater visibility, and leave behind their shells as shelter, further altering possible inhabitants of their coastal domain.

=== Weather and climate change ===
Wind farms may affect weather in their immediate vicinity. Turbulence from spinning wind turbine rotors increases vertical mixing of heat and water vapor that affects the meteorological conditions downwind, including rainfall. Overall, wind farms lead to a slight warming at night and a slight cooling during the day time. This effect can be reduced by using more efficient rotors or placing wind farms in regions with high natural turbulence. Warming at night could "benefit agriculture by decreasing frost damage and extending the growing season. Many farmers already do this with air circulators".

Another study by David Keith and Lee Miller on climactic impacts of wind power, which predicted warming when considering the area of the United States, has been criticized by Mark Z. Jacobson on the grounds of its limited geographical scope, with the argument that large-scale wind energy extraction would significantly lower global temperatures.

== Impacts on people ==
Acceptance of wind and solar facilities in one's community is stronger among U.S. Democrats (blue), while acceptance of nuclear power plants is stronger among U.S. Republicans (red).

=== Aesthetics ===
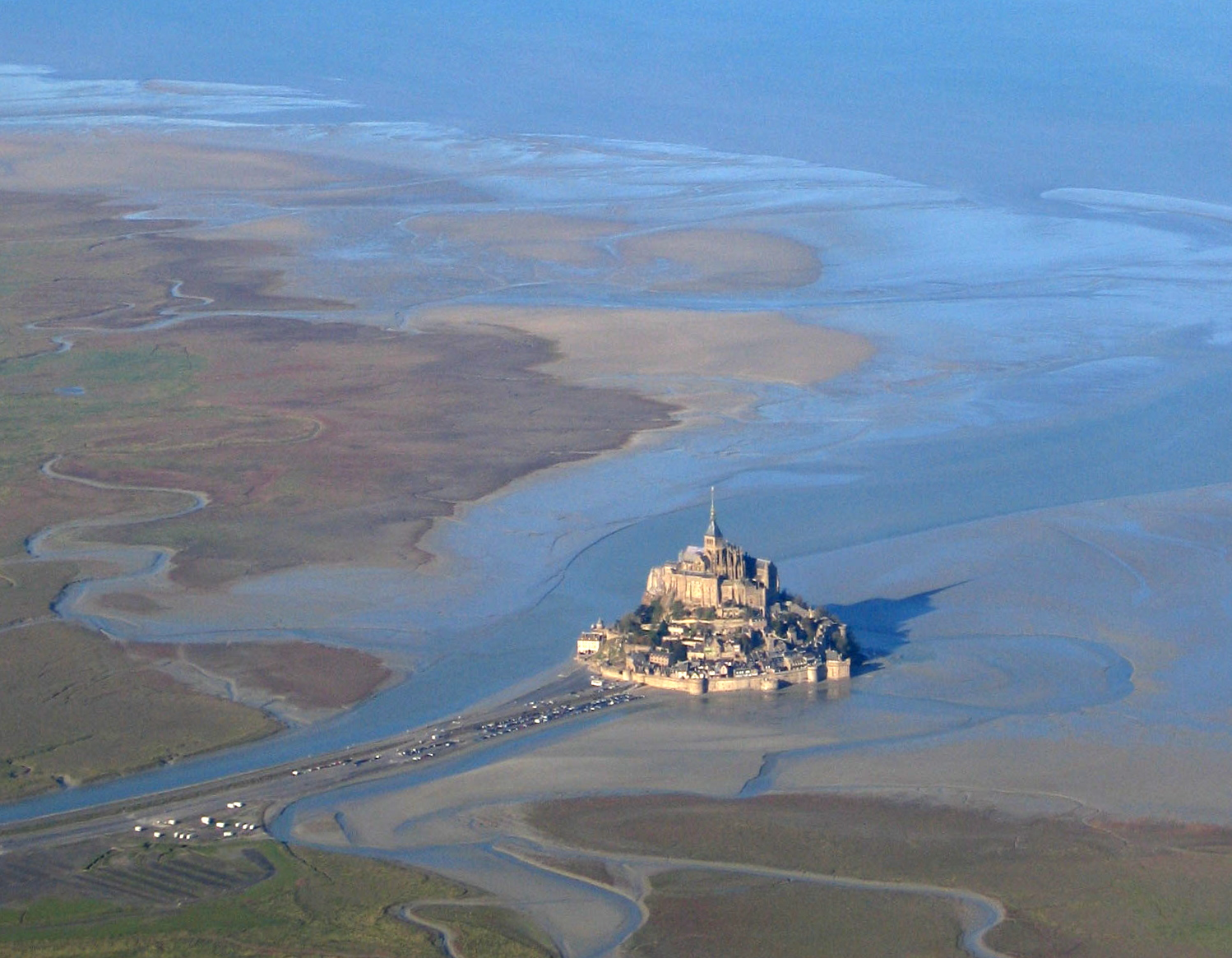
The surroundings of Mont Saint-Michel at low tide. While windy coasts are good locations for wind farms, aesthetic considerations may preclude such developments in order to preserve historic views of cultural sites.

Aesthetic considerations of wind power stations often have a significant role in their evaluation process. To some, the perceived aesthetic aspects of wind power stations may conflict with the protection of historical sites. They can lead to "industrialization of the countryside". Wind power stations are less likely to be perceived negatively in urbanized and industrial regions. Aesthetic issues are subjective and some people find wind farms pleasant or see them as symbols of energy independence and local prosperity. A report by the Mountaineering Council of Scotland concluded that wind farms harmed tourism in areas known for natural landscapes and panoramic views. While studies in Scotland predict wind farms will damage tourism, in other countries some wind farms have themselves become tourist attractions, with several having visitor centers at ground level or even observation decks atop turbine towers. Onshore wind farm’s network of turbines, access roads, transmission lines, and substations can result in "energy sprawl"; although land between the turbines and roads can still be used for agriculture.

In the 1980s, wind energy was being discussed as part of a soft energy path. Renewable energy commercialization led to an increasing industrial image of wind power, which is being criticized by various stakeholders in the planning process, including nature protection associations. Newer wind farms have larger, more widely spaced turbines, and have a less cluttered appearance than older installations. Wind farms are often built on land that has already been impacted by land clearing and they coexist easily with other land uses.

Coastal areas and areas of higher altitude such as ridgelines are considered prime for wind farms, due to constant wind speeds. However, both locations tend to be areas of high visual impact and can be a contributing factor in local communities' resistance to some projects. Both the proximity to densely populated areas and the necessary wind speeds make coastal locations ideal for wind farms.

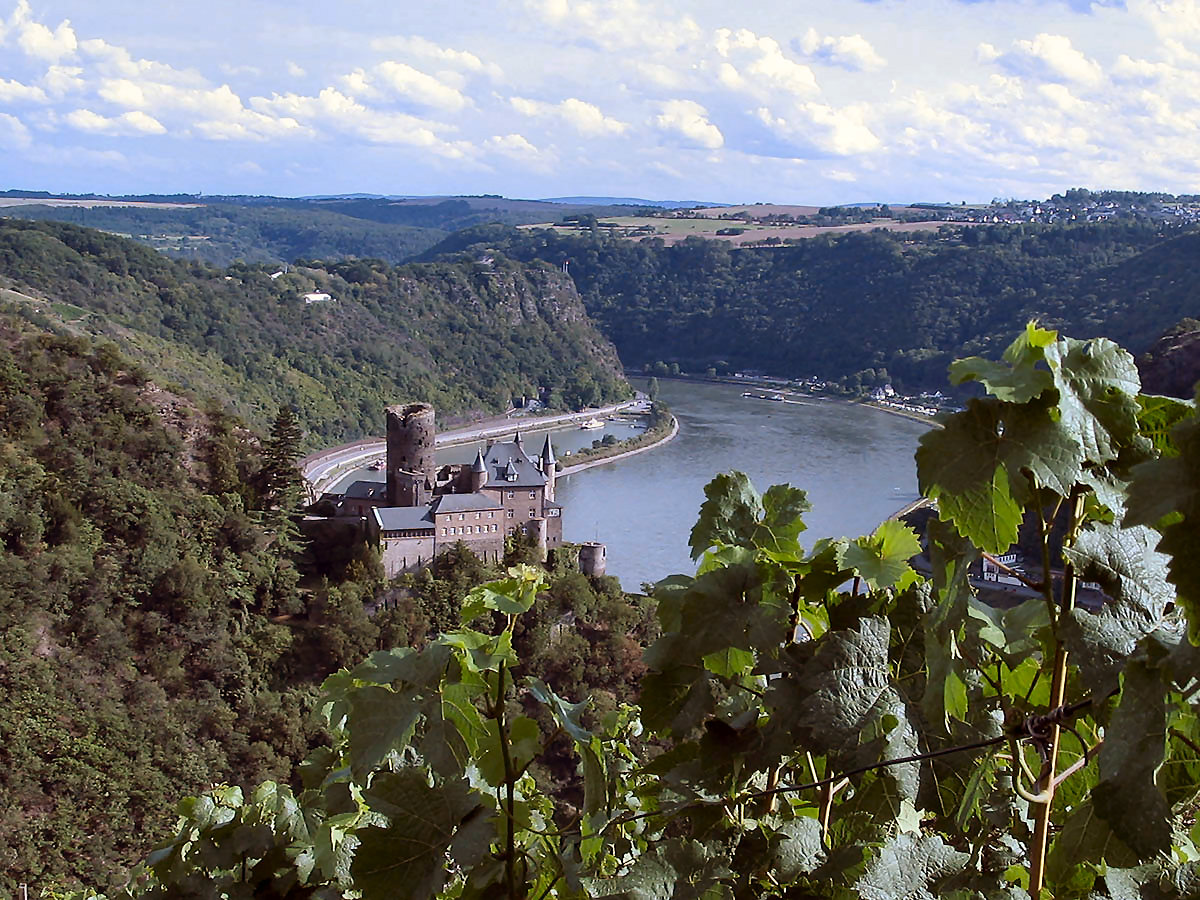
Loreley rock in Rhineland-Palatinate, part of UNESCO World heritage site Rhine Gorge

Wind power stations can impact on important sight relations which are a key part of culturally important landscapes, such as in the Rhine Gorge or Moselle valley. Conflicts between the heritage status of certain areas and wind power projects have arisen in various countries. In 2011 UNESCO raised concerns regarding a proposed wind farm 17 kilometres away from the French island abbey of Mont-Saint-Michel. In Germany, the impact of wind farms on valuable cultural landscapes has implications on zoning and land-use planning. For example, sensitive parts of the Moselle valley and the background of the Hambach Castle, according to the plans of the state government, will be kept free of wind turbines.

Wind turbines require aircraft warning lights, which may create light pollution. Complaints about these lights have caused the US FAA to consider allowing fewer lights per turbine in certain areas. Residents near turbines may complain of "shadow flicker" caused by rotating turbine blades, when the sun passes behind the turbine. This can be avoided by locating the wind farm to avoid unacceptable shadow flicker, or by turning the turbine off for the time of the day when the sun is at the angle that causes flicker. If a turbine is poorly sited and adjacent to many homes, the duration of shadow flicker on a neighbourhood can last hours.

=== Noise ===
Loud or persistent noise increases stress which could then lead to diseases, and wind turbines do generate noise, though at typical setback distances, it is extremely low. For example, at a distance of 300 metres (980 ft) the sound generated may be around 45 dB; however, at a distance of 1.5 km (1 mi), most wind turbines become inaudible. Thus the noise generated by wind turbines does not affect human health when the turbines are properly placed.

A 2014 study by Health Canada involving 1238 households (representing 79 percent of the households in the geographic area studied) and 4000 hours of testing in Ontario and on Prince Edward Island includes the following supportive statements of wind turbine low frequency noise annoyance in its summary:

"Wind turbines emit low frequency noise, which can enter the home with little or no reduction in energy, potentially resulting in... annoyance."

Regarding the comparison of low frequency wind turbine noise annoyance to transportation noise annoyance, the Health Canada study summary states: "Studies have consistently shown.. that, in comparison to the scientific literature on noise annoyance to transportation noise sources such as rail or road traffic, community annoyance with (low frequency) wind turbine noise begins at a lower sound level and increases more rapidly with increasing wind turbine noise."

The summary also includes the following three findings of its own study:

- "Statistically significant exposure-response relationships were found between increasing wind turbine noise levels and the prevalence of reporting high annoyance. These associations were found with annoyance due to noise, vibrations, blinking lights, shadow and visual impacts from wind turbines. In all cases, annoyance increased with increasing exposure to wind turbine noise levels."
- "Community annoyance was observed to drop at distances between 1–2 kilometers (0.6 to 1.2 miles) in Ontario." (It dropped at 550 meters (1/3 mile) on Prince Edward Island.)
- "Annoyance was significantly lower among the 110 participants who received personal benefit, which could include rent, payments or other indirect benefits of having wind turbines in the area e.g., community improvements."

The above Health Canada summary states that "no statistically significant association was observed between measured blood pressure, resting heart rate, (hair cortisol concentrations) and wind turbine noise exposure."

Wind turbine syndrome, a psychosomatic disorder, refers to the belief that low-frequency wind turbine noise, either directly or through annoyance, causes or contributes to various measurable health effects related to anxiety, for which there is little general evidence.

== Offshore ==
Many offshore wind farms have contributed to electricity needs in Europe and Asia for years, and as of 2014 the first offshore wind farms were under development in U.S. waters. The offshore wind industry has grown dramatically over the last several decades, especially in Europe and China.

Traditional offshore wind turbines are attached to the seabed in shallower waters near the shore. As offshore wind technologies become more advanced, floating structures have begun to be used in deeper waters where more wind resources exist.

Common environmental concerns associated with offshore wind developments include:

- The risk to seabirds being struck by wind turbine blades or being displaced from critical habitats;
- The physical presence of offshore wind farms altering the behavior of marine mammals, fish, and seabirds by reasons of either attraction or avoidance;
- Physical changes of the marine environments from large offshore wind projects
- Underwater vibration and noise during construction impacts marine life.

=== Physical concerns ===
Research has shown that large off shore wind fams can impact wind velocities, ocean temperatures, turbidity, and oxygen levels. Turbines create a wind wake, that can reduce wind speed on the leeward side of turbines. A 2022 study on offshore wind farms in the North Sea, aimed to assess how these changes impact marine ecosystems. The research found that while wind turbines do not cause significant surface impacts, they do influence ocean stratification by reducing vertical mixing which could affect nutrient distribution. In addition, wind turbine wakes can extend as far as 70 km from the turbine hub. These wind wakes have the ability to change local wind patterns and overall energy dynamics, which could contribute to rising sea surface temperatures.

Offshore wind farms also have contributed to changing the amount of phytoplankton on the surface. Researchers have found that these turbines increase concentrations of these species, leading to the potential to impact primary productivity in surrounding ecosystems

Installation traditional offshore wind farm pilings changes the substrate of the ocean floor nearby. These areas change from sandy/muddy ocean floors to concrete hard surfaces. While there are some negatives to this, research has found that these new substrates can be the perfect home to help endangered species repopulate and expand. A study of blue mussels in Denmark found that these pilings were perfect artificial reefs to allow the population to rebound. Articial reefs could also potentially lead to the doubling of species, helping endangered and threatened species in the area.

=== Noise concerns ===
Germany restricts underwater noise during pile driving to less than 160 dB. During construction, heavy equipment generates noise and vibrations that are very well conducted through water and impacting marine life, such as harbour porpoise which rely on sound for navigation underwater. Attempts to partially mitigate the impact involve e.g. building air bubble curtains around the towers.

=== Current status ===
Due to the landscape protection status of large areas of the Wadden Sea, a major World Heritage Site with various national parks (e.g. Lower Saxon Wadden Sea National Park), German offshore installations are mostly restricted on areas outside the territorial waters. Offshore capacity in Germany is therefore way behind the British or Danish near coast installments, which face much lower restrictions.

In 2009, a comprehensive government environmental study of coastal waters in the United Kingdom concluded that there is scope for between 5,000 and 7,000 offshore wind turbines to be installed without an adverse impact on the marine environment. The study – which forms part of the Department of Energy and Climate Change's Offshore Energy Strategic Environmental Assessment – is based on more than a year's research. It included analysis of seabed geology, as well as surveys of sea birds and marine mammals.

A study published in 2014 suggests that some seals prefer to hunt near turbines, likely due to the laid stones functioning as artificial reefs which attract invertebrates and fish.

The turbines are often scaled-up versions of existing land technologies. However, the foundations are unique to offshore wind and are listed below:

=== Monopile foundation ===
Monopile foundations are used in shallow depth applications (0–30 m) and consist of a pile being driven to varying depths into the seabed (10–40 m) depending on the soil conditions. The pile-driving construction process is an environmental concern as the noise produced is loud and propagates far in the water, even after mitigation strategies such as bubble shields, slow start, and acoustic cladding. These foundations still create artificial reefs and "are vulnerable to the erosive process of scour, which can impact turbine operations"

=== Tripod fixed bottom ===
Tripod fixed bottom foundations are used in transitional depth applications (20–80 m) and consist of three legs connecting to a central shaft that supports the turbine base. Each leg has a pile driven into the seabed, though less depth is necessary because of the wide foundation. This option is ideal for conditions that areas that have medium - stiff soils, and environmental effects are a combination of those for monopile and gravity foundations still requiring " Scour protection around the base of the tripod in areas with high bottom currents or easily erodible sediment"

=== Gravity foundation ===
Gravity foundations are used in shallow depth applications (0–30 m) and consist of a large and heavy base constructed of steel or concrete to rest on the seabed. The footprint is relatively large and may cause scouring, artificial reefs, or physical destruction of habitat upon introduction, as "the installation site must be flat and level, so the seabed is often dredged in preparation for foundation placement

=== Gravity tripod ===
Gravity tripod foundations are used in transitional depth applications (10–40 m) and consist of two heavy concrete structures connected by three legs, one structure sitting on the seabed while the other is above the water. As of 2013, no offshore windfarms were using this foundation. The environmental concerns are identical to those of gravity foundations, though the scouring effect may be less significant depending on the design.

=== Floating structure ===
Floating structure foundations are used in deep depth applications (40–900 m) and consist of a balanced floating structure moored to the seabed with fixed cables. The floating structure may be stabilized using buoyancy, the mooring lines, or a ballast. The mooring lines may cause minor scouring or a potential for collision.

== See also ==
- Environmental movement
- Environmental effects of coal
- Environmental effects of nuclear power
- Environmental issues with energy
- Low-carbon economy
- Renewable energy debate
