= Paul Sellew =

CEO Of Little Leaf Farms

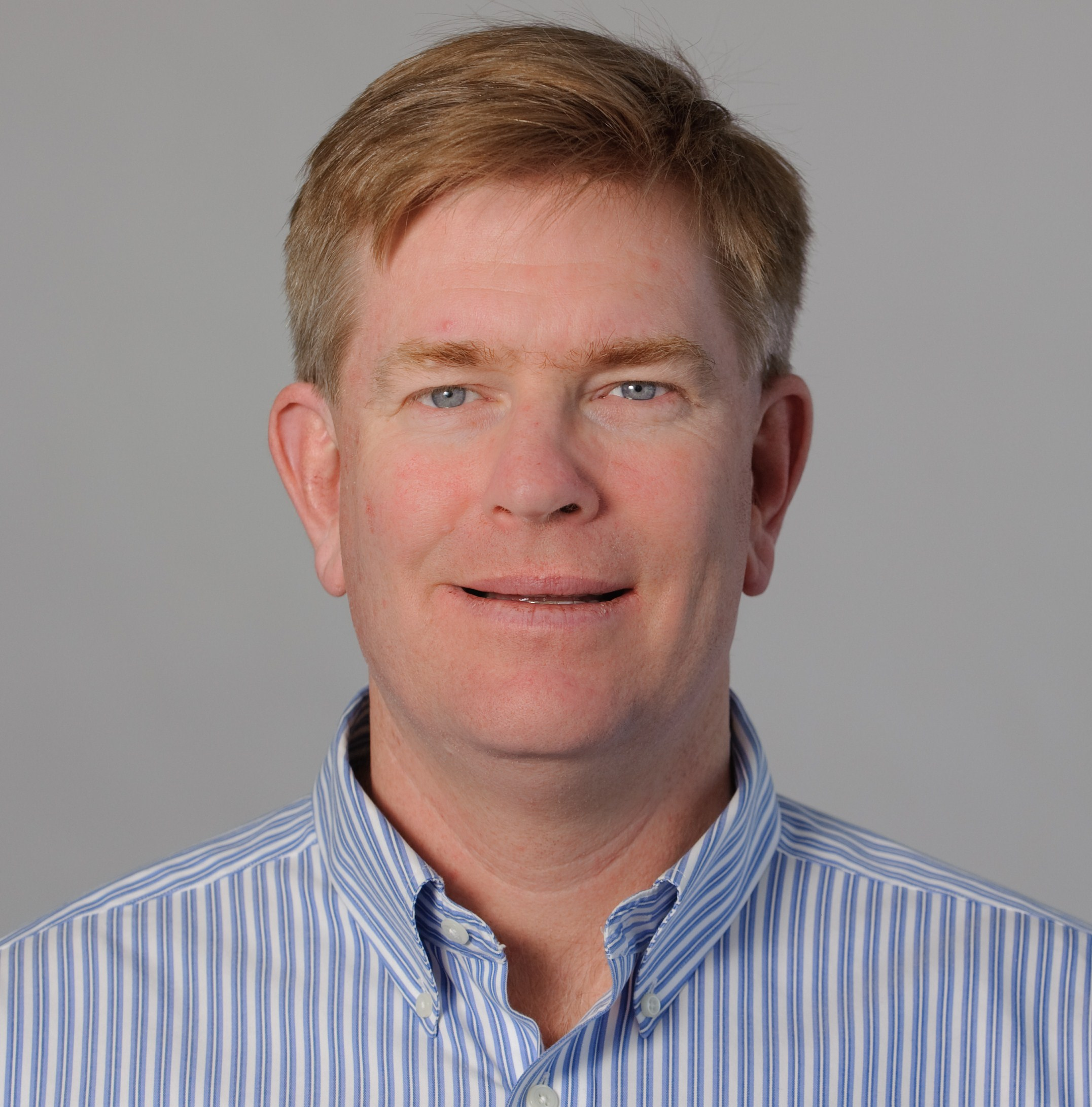
- Paul Sellew headshot
- Born: 1957 (age 67–68)
- Known for: Founder and CEO of Little Leaf Farms

Paul Sellew (born 1957) is an American entrepreneur working in sustainable agriculture. He is the founder and CEO of Little Leaf Farms.

== Early life ==
His first job on his family’s nursery paved the way for Sellew’s later career path in greenhouse horticulture. While working on the farm, Sellew’s first company Earthgro was inspired by an abundance of organic waste from nearby farms and turning these resources into high quality growing media. He also played professional basketball in Europe and South America for three years.

== Career ==
Three years after graduating from the Cornell University College of Agriculture and Life Sciences, Sellew founded Earthgro, Inc. in 1983. Sellew has also founded and led environmentally conscious companies such as International Process Systems, Environmental Credit Corp., Backyard Farms, and Harvest Power. Sellew has served on the Board of Directors for the US Composting Council.

In 2015, Sellew founded Little Leaf Farms in Devens, Massachusetts. Built around employing high tech hydroponic greenhouse technology Little Leaf Farms grows millions of pounds of leafy greens each year using rainwater for irrigation, natural sunlight, and producing a product free of chemical pesticides, herbicides and fungicides. Little Leaf Farms now operates greenhouses in both Devens, Massachusetts and McAdoo, Pennsylvania
