= Brown energy =

Brown energy or brown power are terms that have been coined to describe energy produced from polluting sources as a contrast to green energy from renewable, non-polluting sources. The term "grey energy" or "gray energy" has been used instead, including by the United Nations.

== See also ==
- Brownout (electricity)
