= Low-carbon electricity =

Power produced with lower carbon dioxide emissions

Electricity from low-carbon sources by source, World

Share of primary energy from low-carbon sources, 2018

Low-carbon electricity or low-carbon power is electricity produced with substantially lower greenhouse gas emissions over the entire lifecycle than power generation using fossil fuels. The energy transition to low-carbon power is one of the most important actions required to limit climate change.

Low carbon power generation sources include wind power, solar power, nuclear power and most hydropower. The term largely excludes conventional fossil fuel plant sources, and is only used to describe a particular subset of operating fossil fuel power systems, specifically, those that are successfully coupled with a flue gas carbon capture and storage (CCS) system. Globally almost 40% of electricity generation came from low-carbon sources in 2020: about 10% being nuclear power, almost 10% wind and solar, and around 20% hydropower and other renewables. Very little low-carbon power comes from fossil sources, mostly due to the cost of CCS technology.

== History ==
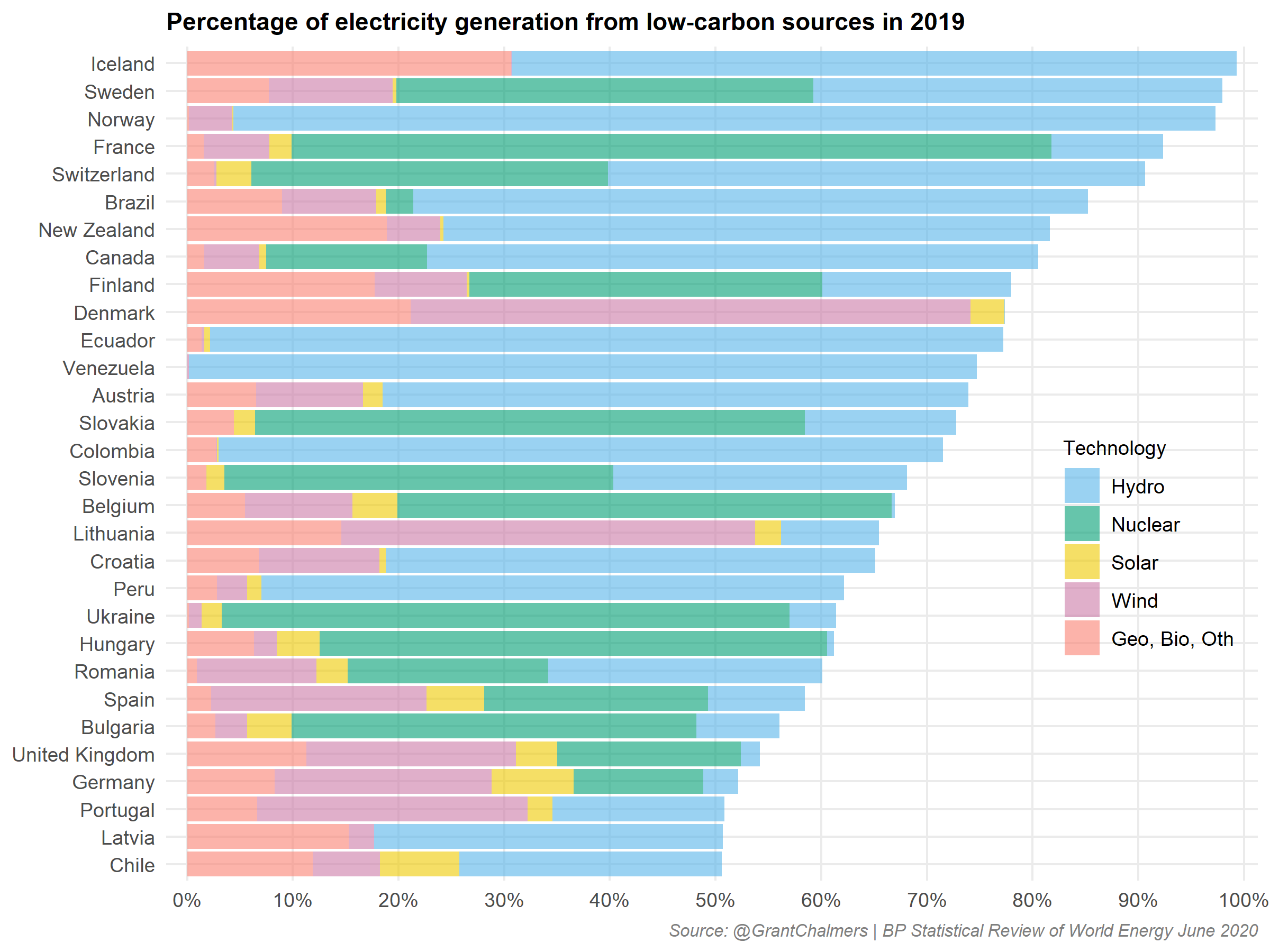
Percentage of electricity generation from low-carbon sources in 2019.

During the late 20th and early 21st century significant findings regarding global warming highlighted the need to curb carbon emissions. From this, the idea for low-carbon power was born. The Intergovernmental Panel on Climate Change (IPCC), established by the World Meteorological Organization (WMO) and the United Nations Environment Program (UNEP) in 1988, set the scientific precedence for the introduction of low-carbon power. The IPCC has continued to provide scientific, technical and socio-economic advice to the world community, through its periodic assessment reports and special reports.

Internationally, the most prominent early step in the direction of low carbon power was the signing of the Kyoto Protocol, which came into force on 16 February 2005, under which most industrialized countries committed to reduce their carbon emissions. The historical event set the political precedence for introduction of low-carbon power technology.

== Power sources by greenhouse gas emissions ==
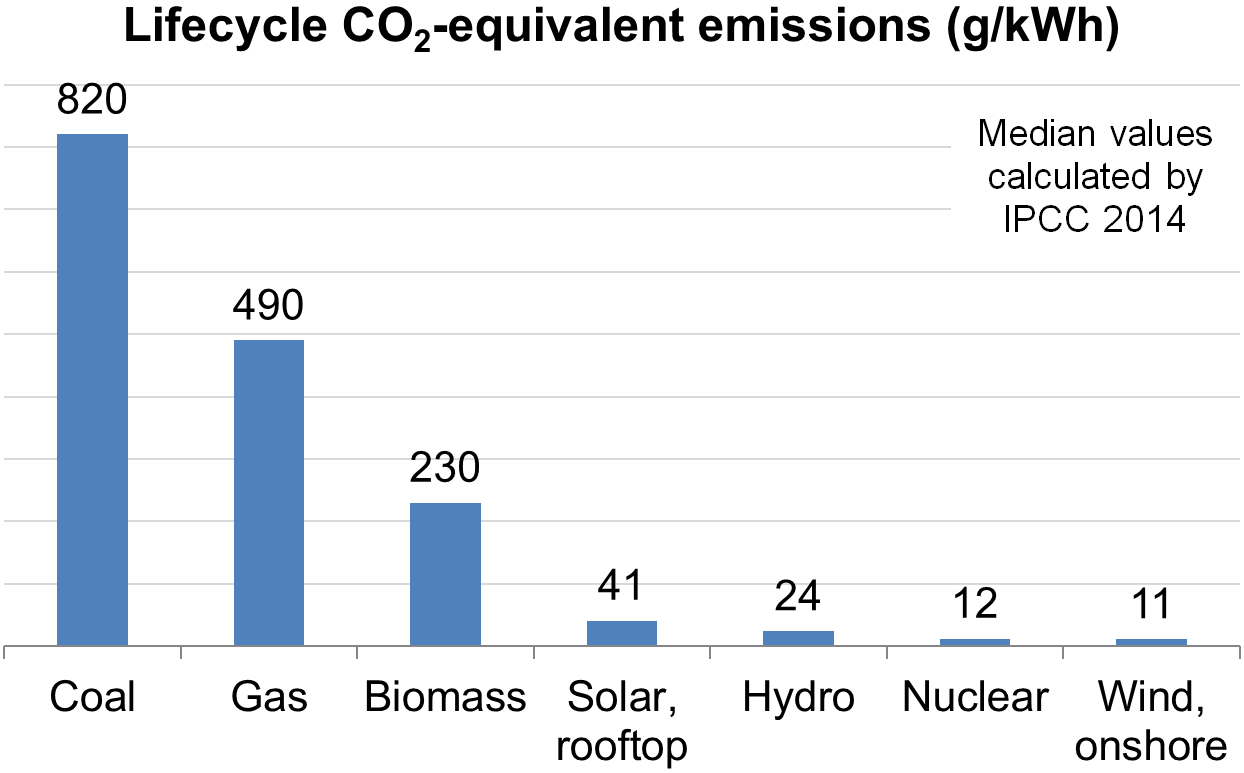
Life-cycle greenhouse gas emissions of electricity supply technologies, median values calculated by IPCC

Life cycle CO_{2} equivalent (including albedo effect) from selected electricity supply technologies according to IPCC 2014. Arranged by decreasing median (g/kWh CO_{2}eq) values.
Technology	Min.	Median	Max.
Currently commercially available technologies
Coal – PC	740	820	910
Gas – combined cycle	410	490	650
Biomass – Dedicated	130	230	420
Solar PV – Utility scale	18	48	180
Solar PV – rooftop	26	41	60
Geothermal	6.0	38	79
Concentrated solar power	8.8	27	63
Hydropower	1.0	24	2200^{1}
Wind Offshore	8.0	12	35
Nuclear	3.7	12	110
Wind Onshore	7.0	11	56
Pre‐commercial technologies
Ocean (Tidal and wave)	5.6	17	28

^{1} see also environmental impact of reservoirs#Greenhouse gases.

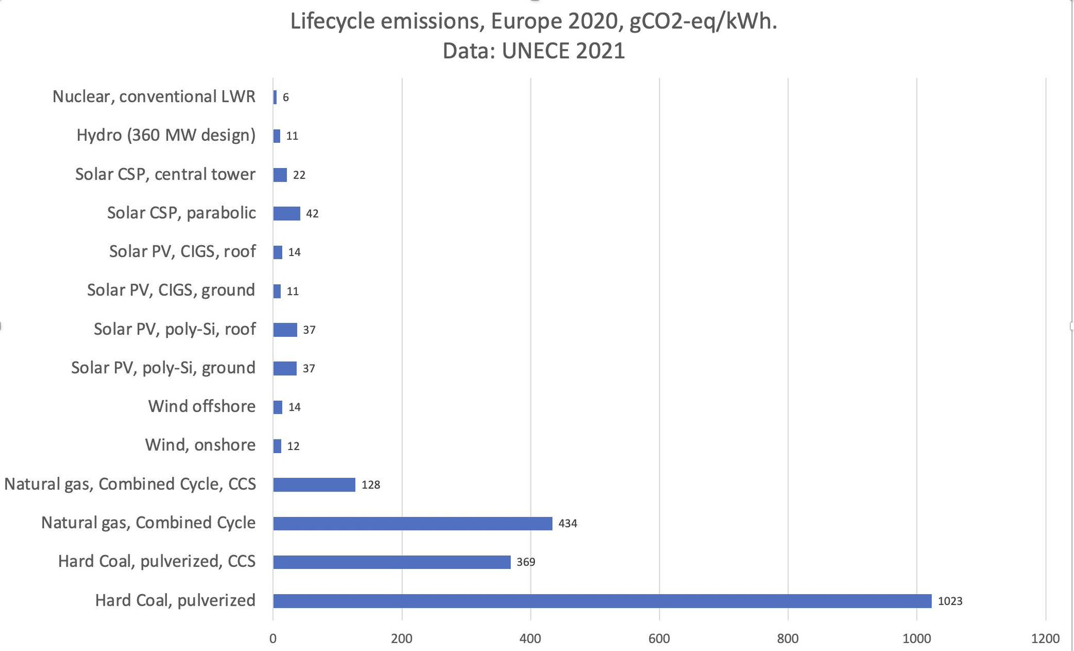
Lifecycle GHG emissions, in g CO_{2} eq. per kWh, UNECE 2020

Lifecycle CO_{2} emissions per kWh, EU28 countries, according to UNECE 2020.
Technology		g/kWh CO_{2}eq
Hard coal	PC, without CCS	1000
Hard coal	IGCC, without CCS	850
Hard coal	SC, without CCS	950
Hard coal	PC, with CCS	370
Hard coal	IGCC, with CCS	280
Hard coal	SC, with CCS	330
Natural gas	NGCC, without CCS	430
Natural gas	NGCC, with CCS	130
Hydro	660 MW	150
Hydro	360 MW	11
Nuclear	average	5.1
CSP	tower	22
CSP	trough	42
PV	poly-Si, ground-mounted	37
PV	poly-Si, roof-mounted	37
PV	CdTe, ground-mounted	12
PV	CdTe, roof-mounted	15
PV	CIGS, ground-mounted	11
PV	CIGS, roof-mounted	14
Wind	onshore	12
Wind	offshore, concrete foundation	14
Wind	offshore, steel foundation	13

List of acronyms:

- PC — pulverized coal
- CCS — carbon capture and storage
- IGCC — integrated gasification combined cycle
- SC — supercritical
- NGCC — natural gas combined cycle
- CSP — concentrated solar power
- PV — photovoltaic power

== Differentiating attributes of low-carbon power sources ==
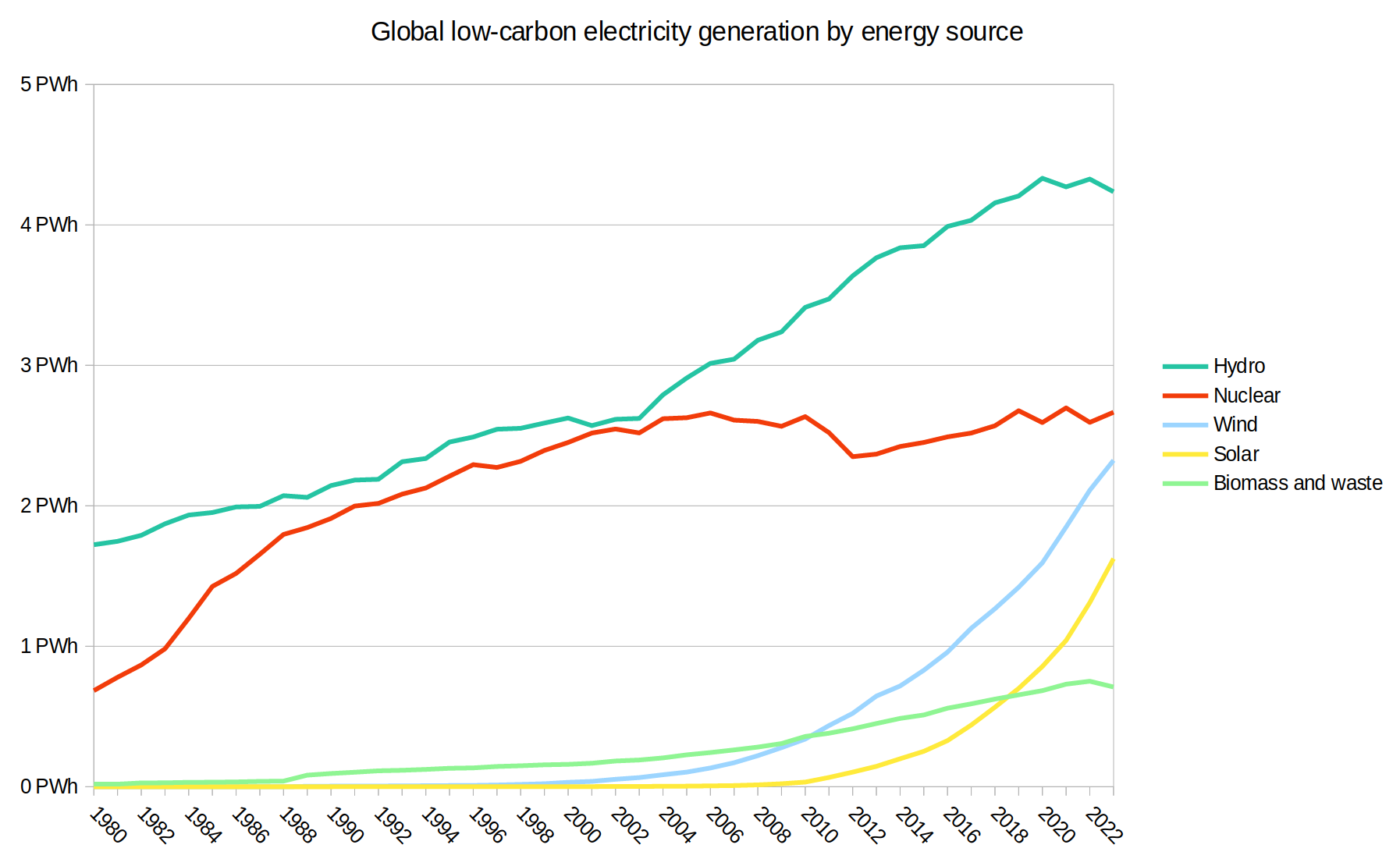
Worldwide low-carbon electricity generation by source

There are many options for lowering current levels of carbon emissions. Some options, such as wind power and solar power, produce low quantities of total life cycle carbon emissions, using entirely renewable sources. Other options, such as nuclear power, produce a comparable amount of carbon dioxide emissions as renewable technologies in total life cycle emissions, but consume non-renewable, but sustainable materials (uranium). The term low-carbon power can also include power that continues to utilize the world's natural resources, such as natural gas and coal, but only when they employ techniques that reduce carbon dioxide emissions from these sources when burning them for fuel, such as the, as of 2012, pilot plants performing Carbon capture and storage.

Because the cost of reducing emissions in the electricity sector appears to be lower than in other sectors such as transportation, the electricity sector may deliver the largest proportional carbon reductions under an economically efficient climate policy.

Technologies to produce electric power with low-carbon emissions are in use at various scales. Together, they accounted for almost 40% of global electricity in 2020, with wind and solar almost 10%.

== Technologies ==
The 2014 Intergovernmental Panel on Climate Change report identifies nuclear, wind, solar and hydroelectricity in suitable locations as technologies that can provide electricity with less than 5% of the lifecycle greenhouse gas emissions of coal power.

=== Hydroelectric power ===
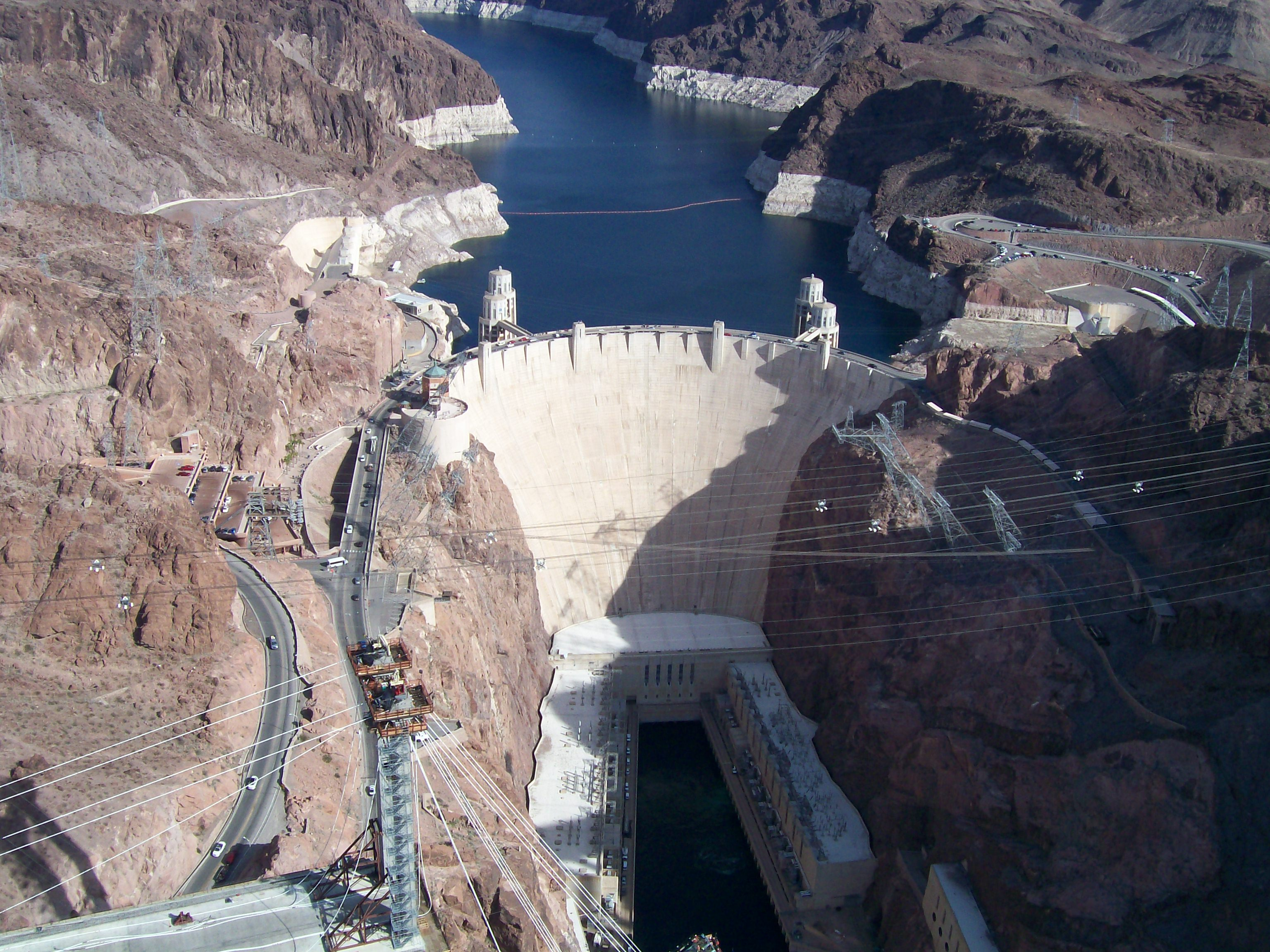
The Hoover Dam when completed in 1936 was both the world's largest electric-power generating station and the world's largest concrete structure.

Hydroelectric plants have the advantage of being long-lived and many existing plants have operated for more than 100 years. Hydropower is also an extremely flexible technology from the perspective of power grid operation. Large hydropower provides one of the lowest cost options in today's energy market, even compared to fossil fuels and there are no harmful emissions associated with plant operation. However, there are typically low greenhouse gas emissions with reservoirs, and possibly high emissions in the tropics.

Hydroelectric power is the world's largest low carbon source of electricity, supplying 15.6% of total electricity in 2019. China is by far the world's largest producer of hydroelectricity in the world, followed by Brazil and Canada.

However, there are several significant social and environmental disadvantages of large-scale hydroelectric power systems: dislocation, if people are living where the reservoirs are planned, release of significant amounts of carbon dioxide and methane during construction and flooding of the reservoir, and disruption of aquatic ecosystems and birdlife. There is a strong consensus now that countries should adopt an integrated approach towards managing water resources, which would involve planning hydropower development in co-operation with other water-using sectors.

=== Nuclear power ===
Nuclear power, with a 9% share of world electricity production from 440 power reactors as of 2025.

Nuclear power, in 2010, also provided two thirds of the twenty seven nation European Union's low-carbon energy, with some EU nations sourcing a large fraction of their electricity from nuclear power; for example France derives 79% of its electricity from nuclear. As of 2020 nuclear power provided 47% low-carbon power in the EU with countries largely based on nuclear power routinely achieving carbon intensity of 30-60 gCO2eq/kWh.

In 2021 United Nations Economic Commission for Europe (UNECE) described nuclear power as important tool to mitigate climate change that has prevented 74 Gt of CO_{2} emissions over the last half century, providing 20% of energy in Europe and 43% of low-carbon energy.

Since 1985, the proportion of electricity generated from low-carbon sources has increased only slightly. Advances in deploying renewables have been mostly offset by declining shares of nuclear power.

Nuclear power has been used since the 1950s as a low-carbon source of baseload electricity. Nuclear power plants in over 30 countries generate about 10% of global electricity. As of 2019, nuclear generated over a quarter of all low-carbon energy, making it the second largest source after hydropower.

Nuclear power's lifecycle greenhouse gas emissions—including the mining and processing of uranium—are similar to the emissions from renewable energy sources. Nuclear power uses little land per unit of energy produced, compared to the major renewables. Additionally, nuclear power does not create local air pollution. Although the uranium ore used to fuel nuclear power plants is a non-renewable resource, enough exists to provide a supply for hundreds to thousands of years. However, uranium resources that can be accessed in an economically feasible manner, at the present state, are limited and uranium production could hardly keep up during the expansion phase. Climate change mitigation pathways consistent with ambitious goals typically see an increase in power supply from nuclear.

There is controversy over whether nuclear power is sustainable, in part due to concerns around nuclear waste, nuclear weapon proliferation, and accidents. Radioactive nuclear waste must be managed for thousands of years. For each unit of energy produced, nuclear energy has caused far fewer accidental and pollution-related deaths than fossil fuels, and the historic fatality rate of nuclear is comparable to renewable sources. Public opposition to nuclear energy often makes nuclear plants politically difficult to implement.

Reducing the time and the cost of building new nuclear plants have been goals for decades but costs remain high and timescales long. Various new forms of nuclear energy are in development, hoping to address the drawbacks of conventional plants. Fast breeder reactors are capable of recycling nuclear waste and therefore can significantly reduce the amount of waste that requires geological disposal, but have not yet been deployed on a large-scale commercial basis. Nuclear power based on thorium (rather than uranium) may be able to provide higher energy security for countries that do not have a large supply of uranium. Small modular reactors may have several advantages over current large reactors: It should be possible to build them faster and their modularization would allow for cost reductions via learning-by-doing. They are also considered safer to use than traditional power plants.

Several countries are attempting to develop nuclear fusion reactors, which would generate small amounts of waste and no risk of explosions. Although fusion power has taken steps forward in the lab, the multi-decade timescale needed to bring it to commercialization and then scale means it will not contribute to a 2050 net zero goal for climate change mitigation.

=== Wind power ===
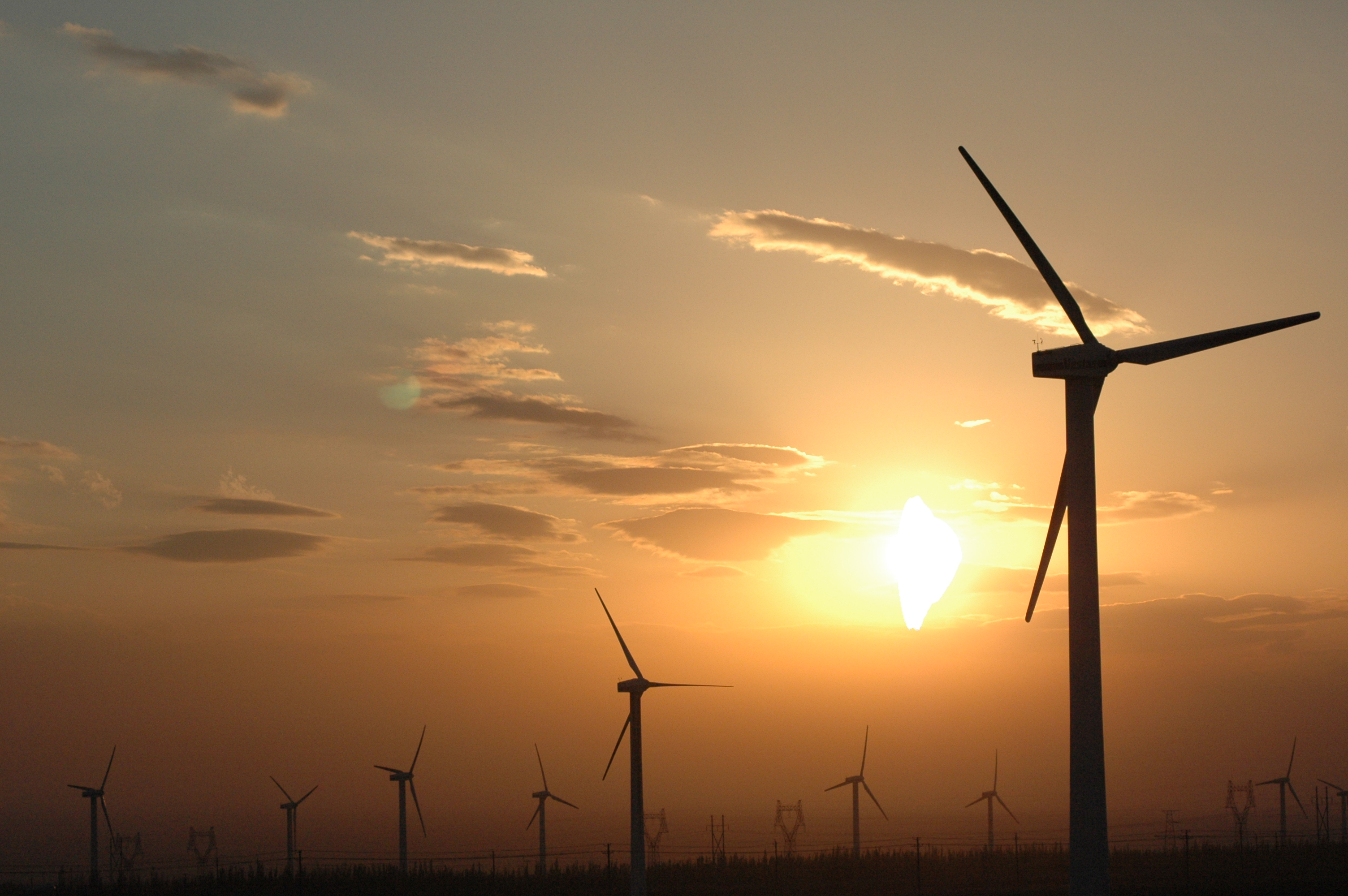
Wind power stations in Xinjiang, China

Wind power is the use of wind energy to generate useful work. Historically, wind power was used by sails, windmills and windpumps, but today it is mostly used to generate electricity. This article deals only with wind power for electricity generation. Today, wind power is generated almost completely using wind turbines, generally grouped into wind farms and connected to the electrical grid.

In 2025, wind supplied about 2,700 TWh of electricity, which was over 8% of world electricity. With about 100 GW added during 2021, mostly in China and the United States, global installed wind power capacity exceeded 800 GW. 30 countries generated more than a tenth of their electricity from wind power in 2024 and wind generation has nearly tripled since 2015. To help meet the Paris Agreement goals to limit climate change, analysts say it should expand much faster – by over 1% of electricity generation per year.

Wind power is a sustainable, renewable energy source, and has a much smaller impact on the environment than burning fossil fuels. Wind power is variable, so it needs energy storage or other dispatchable generation energy sources to attain a reliable supply of electricity. Land-based (onshore) wind farms have a greater visual impact on the landscape than most other power stations per energy produced. Wind farms sited offshore have less visual impact and have higher capacity factors, although they are generally more expensive. Offshore wind power currently has a share of about 10% of new installations.

Wind power is one of the lowest-cost electricity sources per unit of energy produced. In many locations, new onshore wind farms are cheaper than new coal or gas plants.

Regions in the higher northern and southern latitudes have the highest potential for wind power. In most regions, wind power generation is higher in nighttime, and in winter when solar power output is low. So combinations of wind and solar power are suitable in many countries.

=== Solar power ===
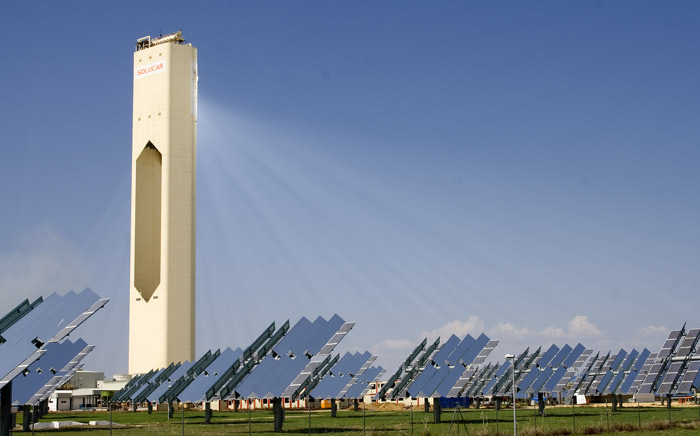
The PS10 concentrates sunlight from a field of heliostats on a central tower.

Solar power is the conversion of sunlight into electricity, either directly using photovoltaics (PV), or indirectly using concentrated solar power (CSP). Concentrated solar power systems use lenses or mirrors and tracking systems to focus a large area of sunlight into a small beam. Photovoltaics convert light into electric current using the photoelectric effect.

Commercial concentrated solar power plants were first developed in the 1980s. The 354 MW SEGS CSP installation is the largest solar power plant in the world, located in the Mojave Desert of California. Other large CSP plants include the Solnova Solar Power Station (150 MW) and the Andasol solar power station (150 MW), both in Spain. The over 200 MW Agua Caliente Solar Project in the United States, and the 214 MW Charanka Solar Park in India, are the world's largest photovoltaic plants. Solar power's share of worldwide electricity usage at the end of 2014 was 1%.

=== Geothermal power ===
Geothermal electricity is electricity generated from geothermal energy. Technologies in use include dry steam power plants, flash steam power plants and binary cycle power plants. Geothermal electricity generation is used in 24 countries while geothermal heating is in use in 70 countries.

Current worldwide installed capacity is 10,715 megawatts (MW), with the largest capacity in the United States (3,086 MW), Philippines, and Indonesia. Estimates of the electricity generating potential of geothermal energy vary from 35 to 2000 GW.

Geothermal power is considered to be sustainable because the heat extraction is small compared to the Earth's heat content. The emission intensity of existing geothermal electric plants is on average 122 kg of CO_{2} per megawatt-hour (MW·h) of electricity, a small fraction of that of conventional fossil fuel plants.

=== Tidal power ===
Tidal power is a form of hydropower that converts the energy of tides into electricity or other useful forms of power. The first large-scale tidal power plant (the Rance Tidal Power Station) started operation in 1966. Although not yet widely used, tidal power has potential for future electricity generation. Tides are more predictable than wind energy and solar power.

=== Carbon capture and storage ===
Carbon capture and storage (CCS) captures carbon dioxide from the flue gas of power plants or other industry, transporting it to an appropriate location where it can be buried securely in an underground reservoir. Between 1972 and 2017, plans were made to add CCS to enough coal and gas power plants to sequester 171 million tonnes of CO_{2} per year, but by 2021 over 98% of these plans had failed. Cost, the absence of measures to address long-term liability for stored CO_{2}, and limited social acceptability have all contributed to project cancellations. As of 2024, CCS is in operation at only five power plants worldwide.

== Outlook and requirements ==
=== Emissions ===
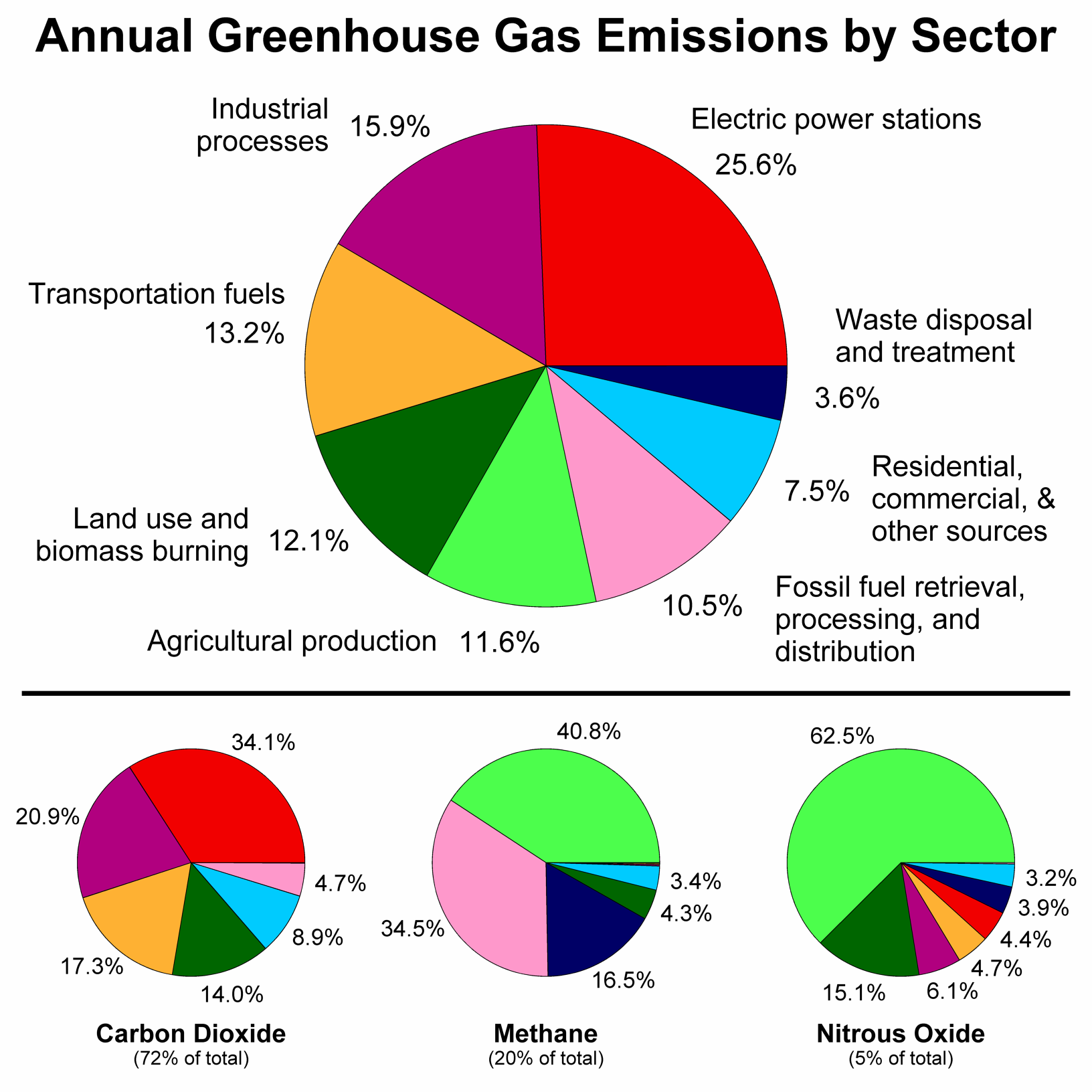
Greenhouse gas emissions by sector. See World Resources Institute for detailed breakdown

The Intergovernmental Panel on Climate Change stated in its first working group report that "most of the observed increase in globally averaged temperatures since the mid-20th century is very likely due to the observed increase in anthropogenic greenhouse gas concentrations, contribute to climate change.

As a percentage of all anthropogenic greenhouse gas emissions, carbon dioxide (CO_{2}) accounts for 72 percent (see Greenhouse gas), and has increased in concentration in the atmosphere from 315 parts per million (ppm) in 1958 to more than 375 ppm in 2005.

Emissions from energy make up more than 61.4 percent of all greenhouse gas emissions. Power generation from traditional coal fuel sources accounts for 18.8 percent of all world greenhouse gas emissions, nearly double that emitted by road transportation.

Estimates state that by 2020 the world will be producing around twice as much carbon emissions as it was in 2000.

The European Union hopes to sign a law mandating net-zero greenhouse gas emissions in the coming year for all 27 countries in the union.

=== Electricity usage ===
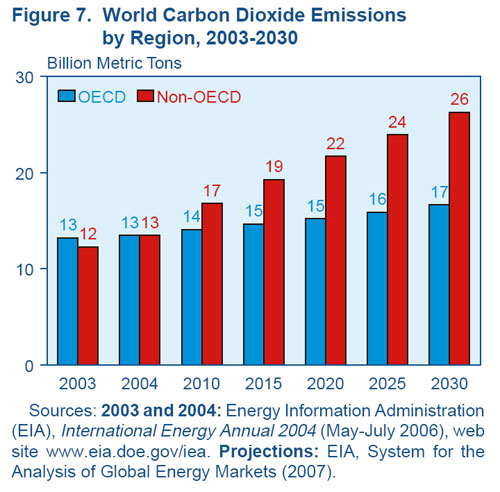
World CO_{2} emissions by region

World energy consumption is predicted to increase from 123,000 TWh (421 quadrillion BTU) in 2003 to 212,000 TWh (722 quadrillion BTU) in 2030. Coal consumption is predicted to nearly double in that same time. The fastest growth is seen in non-OECD Asian countries, especially China and India, where economic growth drives increased energy use. By implementing low-carbon power options, world electricity demand could continue to grow while maintaining stable carbon emission levels.

In the transportation sector there are moves away from fossil fuels and towards electric vehicles, such as mass transit and the electric car. These trends are small, but may eventually add a large demand to the electrical grid.

Domestic and industrial heat and hot water have largely been supplied by burning fossil fuels such as fuel oil or natural gas at the consumers' premises. Some countries have begun heat pump rebates to encourage switching to electricity, potentially adding a large demand to the grid.

=== Energy infrastructure ===
Coal-fired power plants are losing market share compared to low carbon power, and any built in the 2020s risk becoming stranded assets or stranded costs, partly because their capacity factors will decline.

=== Investment ===
Investment in low-carbon power sources and technologies is increasing at a rapid rate. Zero-carbon power sources produce about 2% of the world's energy, but account for about 18% of world investment in power generation, attracting $100 billion of investment capital in 2006.

== See also ==
- Business action on climate change
- Carbon-neutral fuel
- Climate change mitigation
- Carbon sink
- Emissions trading
- Energy development
- Green hydrogen
- Hydrogen economy
- Renewable energy commercialization
- Sustainable energy
