= Public opinion on nuclear issues =

Share of the public which opposes nuclear energy as a means of electricity production in 2011, following the Fukushima disaster

Survey respondents in the European Union and US considered investment in nuclear energy to be a higher priority than those in China, though all three favored renewable energy much more strongly than nuclear overall.

Global public support for energy sources, based on a survey by Ipsos (2011)

Public opinion on nuclear issue is the aggregate of attitudes or beliefs held by the adult population concerning nuclear power, nuclear weapons and uranium mining. Opinions vary very significantly across countries, and have significantly changed over time, with support declining mostly as result of widely publicized nuclear incidents, often presented in a distorted way, where the debate on climate change has boosted support for nuclear power as low-carbon energy source in many countries.

According to environmentalists Stewart Brand and James Lovelock, the debate on nuclear power is far from being evidence-based and rational, with a number of anti-nuclear organizations trying to pull it into an "absolute evil" category and focusing on risks and boost fear while ignoring the benefits such as zero emissions. Part of the negative attitude towards civilian nuclear power is also derived from opposition to nuclear weapons, though many civilian nuclear power programs have contributed to nuclear disarmament through programs such as Megatons to Megawatts.

== 2005 ==
In 2005, the International Atomic Energy Agency presented the results of a series of public opinion surveys in the Global Public Opinion on Nuclear Issues report. The poll was limited to 18 countries but relatively diverse, with countries on all continents surveyed. The support varied significantly between countries, from 66% in support for new nuclear power plants in South Korea, to only 12% in Morocco. In most countries majority of citizens supported operations of existing nuclear power plants but opinions were divided on construction of new ones, with minority calling for shut down of existing power plants. Across all countries, 38% were in support of expansion of nuclear power and 47% opposed.

A poll in the European Union for Feb-Mar 2005 showed 37% in favor of nuclear energy and 55% opposed, leaving 8% undecided.

== 2006 ==
The same agency ran another poll in Oct-Nov 2006 that showed 14% favoured building new nuclear plants, 34% favored maintaining the same number, and 39% favored reducing the number of operating plants, leaving 13% undecided. This poll showed that the approval of nuclear power rose with the education level of respondents and was lower for women.

== 2007 ==
In the United States, the Nuclear Energy Institute has run polls since the 1980s. A poll in conducted March 30 to April 1, 2007, chose solar as the most likely largest source for electricity in the US in 15 years (27% of those polled) followed by nuclear, 24% and coal, 14%. Those who were favorable of nuclear being used dropped to 63% from a historic high of 70% in 2005 and 68% in September, 2006.

A CBS News/New York Times poll in 2007 showed that a majority of Americans would not like to have a nuclear plant built in their community, although an increasing percentage would like to see more nuclear power.

The two fuel sources that attracted the highest levels of support in the 2007 MIT Energy Survey are solar power and wind power. Outright majorities would choose to "increase a lot" use of these two fuels, and better than three out of four Americans would like to increase these fuels in the U. S. energy portfolio. Fourteen per cent of respondents would like to see nuclear power "increase a lot".

A September 2007 survey conducted by the Center for International and Security Studies at the University of Maryland showed that:

63 percent of Russians favor eliminating all nuclear weapons, 59 percent support removing all nuclear weapons from high alert, and 53 percent support cutting the Russian and U.S. nuclear arsenals to 400 nuclear weapons each. In the United States, 73 percent of the public favors eliminating all nuclear weapons, 64 percent support removing all nuclear weapons from high alert, and 59 percent support reducing Russian and U.S. nuclear arsenals to 400 weapons each. Eighty percent of Russians and Americans want their countries to participate in the Comprehensive Test Ban Treaty.

== 2008 ==
Eurobarometer 2008 poll indicated 44% supporting and 45% opposing nuclear energy in the European Union. Majority (over 62%) also appreciated nuclear power as means to prevent climate change.

== 2010 ==
According to a 2010 Soka Gakkai International survey of youth attitudes in Japan, Korea, the Philippines, New Zealand and the US, 67.3% reject the use of nuclear weapons under any circumstances. Of the respondents 59.1% said that they would feel safer if nuclear weapons no longer existed in the world. Identified as most needed measures toward nuclear abolition were political and diplomatic negotiations (59.9%), peace education (56.3%) and strengthened measures within the UN framework (53.7%). While 37.4% said that nuclear abolition is possible, 40.7% said that nuclear arms reduction not abolition is possible.

Prominent environmentalist Stewart Brand published a Whole Earth Discipline book which was one of the first significant reversals of traditional anti-nuclear policy in the environmental movement. Director of Greenpeace UK (2001-2007) Stephen Tindale also expressed his support for nuclear power as effective means to prevent climate change. A number of polls on environmental websites (Grist.org, Treehugger.com) showed 59% and 54% respectively in "conditional support" for nuclear power.

For younger Greens, cold-war nuclear fears are ancient history, and Chernobyl is not part of their personal experience. The threat of climate change is what dominates their world, along with accelerating technology, with which they are comfortable. From the perspective of the young, nuclear is just another technology, to be judged on how well it works, not on antiquated obsessions of their elders.

— Stewart Brand, Whole Earth Discipline

Both Eurobarometer 2008 and OECD poll (2010) indicated a "clear correlation between knowledge and support", where respondents who were more aware of the greenhouse gas emissions from energy sector were more likely to support low-emission nuclear power.

== 2011 ==
A 2011 poll suggests that skepticism over nuclear power is growing in Sweden following Japan's nuclear crisis. 36 percent of respondents want to phase-out nuclear power, up from 15 percent in a similar survey two years ago.

Both UK market research firm Ipsos MORI and the Japanese Asahi Shimbun newspaper found drops in support for nuclear power technology in most countries, with support continuing in a number including the US. The Ipsos MORI poll found that nuclear had the lowest support of any established technology for generating electricity, with 38%. Coal was at 48% support while solar energy, wind power and hydro all found favor with more than 90% of those surveyed.

In 2011, Deutsche Bank analysts concluded that "the global impact of the Fukushima accident is a fundamental shift in public perception with regard to how a nation prioritizes and values its populations health, safety, security, and natural environment when determining its current and future energy pathways". As a consequence, "renewable energy will be a clear long-term winner in most energy systems, a conclusion supported by many voter surveys conducted over the past few weeks. At the same time, we consider natural gas to be, at the very least, an important transition fuel, especially in those regions where it is considered secure".

The global research agency GlobeScan, commissioned by BBC News, polled 23,231 people in 23 countries from July to September 2011, several months after the Fukushima nuclear disaster. In countries with existing nuclear programs, people are significantly more opposed than they were in 2005, with only the UK and US bucking the trend and being more supportive of nuclear power. Most believe that boosting energy efficiency and renewable energy can meet their needs.

Just 22% agreed that "nuclear power is relatively safe and an important source of electricity, and we should build more nuclear power plants". In contrast, 71% thought their country "could almost entirely replace coal and nuclear energy within 20 years by becoming highly energy-efficient and focusing on generating energy from the Sun and wind". Globally, 39% want to continue using existing reactors without building new ones, while 30% would like to shut everything down now.

The Fukushima incident has been described as subject to "a decade of disinformation" in 2020, with media and environmental organizations incorrectly conflating the earthquake and tsunami devastations with the consequences of the nuclear accident (which were relatively small).

== 2012 ==
According to a 2012 Pew Research Center poll, 44% of Americans favor and 49% oppose the promotion of increased use of nuclear power, while 69% favor increasing federal funding for research on wind power, solar power, and hydrogen energy technology. Gallup poll found that 57% of American still favored nuclear energy.

A meta-analysis also confirmed positive correlation between support for nuclear power and understanding of nuclear power operations, with a significant effect of people living closer to nuclear power plant showing higher levels of support in general.

In June 2012, there were a significant number of Japanese people who wanted to move away from nuclear power due to the shutdown of all nuclear power plants after Fukushima.

== 2013 ==
In 2013, Soka Gakkai International released the results of its international survey in which 91.2% of respondents believe that nuclear arms are inhumane and 80.6% favor a comprehensive treaty banning all weapons of mass destruction. The 2,840 survey respondents were men and women of ages 15 to 45 from Australia, Brazil, Britain, Italy, Japan, Malaysia, Mexico, South Korea and the USA—the official and unofficial nuclear weapon states, states under the US nuclear umbrella and states in nuclear-weapons-free zones (NWFZs). A Roper poll in USA found support for new nuclear power plants at 55%, with 41% opposed, down from the peak level of support in 2010 of 70% in favor versus 27% opposed.

== 2015 ==
A Pew Research Survey conducted in 2015 found that Americans have shifted their view on the use of the atomic bomb to defeat the Japanese — 56% believed that the use of nuclear weapons was justified, with 34% saying it was not. Immediately after the bombings that figure was at 84% in favor of the bombing, according to a Gallup poll. A Gallup poll in the US in March 2015 found support for nuclear power at 51%, with 43% opposed. This was the lowest level of support for nuclear since 2001, and significantly down from the 2010 peak of 62% in favor, versus 33% opposed.

Pew Research also asked about attitudes towards nuclear power among AAAS scientists, where 65% supported construction of new power plants and 33% opposed it.

== 2016 ==
A 2016 Gallup poll of the American public revealed that public support for nuclear energy in the United States was at a record low of 44%, with the majority (54%) of respondents saying that they oppose nuclear energy. This was the first time that public opposition to nuclear power in the United States had achieved a majority in the 23 years of Gallup polling on the subject.

== 2017 ==
According to The Guardian, "A September poll by ReachTel found 73% of Australians support the ban on nuclear weapons and believe nuclear weapons pose a threat to global security."

== 2019 ==
In polls performed as part of preparation for a new nuclear power plant in Poland in the locations designated as possible plant locations 71% of the local residents supported the plan. In the USA support and opposition to nuclear power plants per Gallup survey is split almost equally, 49% opposing and 49% supporting them, while 47% believed they are safe. In Belgium 83% respondents prefer to keep low-carbon nuclear power as the country's energy source.

== 2020 ==
A Carnegie Mellon University study indicated strong "perception barrier and the regulatory cost" which makes it likely that existing nuclear power plants, under the current regulatory framework in the US, are more likely to be replaced by fossil fuel power plants which are perceived as "safer". This is even though an average nuclear power plant prevents emission of 2,000,000 metric tons of CO_{2}, 5,200 metric tons of SO_{2} and 2,200 metric tons of NO_{x} in a year.

Pew Research survey across US population found 55% opposing new nuclear power plants and 43% supporting expansion of nuclear power.

In a poll conducted by the Institution of Mechanical Engineers, only 42% of the people in Britain support the use of nuclear energy for electric power generation. Meanwhile, only 26% of young adults believe that nuclear energy is a carbon-free power generator. Researchers suggest there is a correlation between age and support for nuclear power: as the age group gets older, the support for nuclear power increases.

== 2021 ==
A May 2021 poll in Sweden showed that 46% of those who responded are in support of keeping existing nuclear reactors and building of new nuclear reactors; 31% of those responded are in support of keeping existing nuclear reactors but are not in support building of new nuclear reactors; 14% of those responded are in support of phasing out nuclear reactors; and 10% of those responded are uncertain of their opinions on the poll.

A poll in Australia indicated 72% of Liberal voters, 79% of Nationals Voters, 50% of Labour voters and 52% Green voters support introduction of nuclear power as new low-carbon electricity source. Overall support for nuclear power in Australia was 55% in favour.

The Pew Research survey across the US population found a reversal of the last year's proportion − 50% supported nuclear power, while 47% opposed.

In Germany, Civey poll asked whether nuclear power should continue to be used to meet climate goals, to which 48.2% replied "definitely yes" or "likely yes" and 43.7% replied "definitely no" or "likely no". According to another poll in Germany, 31% respondents would switch to nuclear power for cheaper electricity while 56% support nuclear power and 34% are opposed to it.

In the United Kingdom YouGov poll, 65% surveyed said nuclear power should play a role in the country's climate policy, 12% expressed strong anti-nuclear sentiment, while 46% are aware of the fact it's a low-carbon energy source.

In the USA Bisconti 2021 poll, 76% were in favor of nuclear power, while 24% opposed it.

In Poland a November 2021 poll indicated 74% in favor of building nuclear power plants in general, 58% supporting their location in their neighborhood and 39% opposing the latter. 82% believe nuclear power plants contribute to energy resilience of the country.

A November 2021 poll found 65% of people in the Czech Republic supporting nuclear energy.

== 2022 ==
In March 2022 53% of the people in Japan supported nuclear energy, constituting the first pro-nuclear majority there since the Fukushima disaster.

In an April 2022 poll from the Institute of Public Affairs in Australia, 53% of Australians agreed that Australia should build nuclear power plants, and 23% disagreed.

In the USA in May 2022 a Gallup poll had nuclear support at 51% with 47% opposed.

In an August 2022 survey in Denmark, which has not operated nuclear plants before, 46% of respondents said they would vote for the introduction of nuclear power, while 39% would vote against it.

== 2023 ==
In the USA in April 2023 a Gallup poll had nuclear support at 54%, the highest level since 2012.

In August 2023 Pew Research Center conducted a survey which found that 57% of Americans favor more nuclear power plants. This is up from 43% in 2020. Support for nuclear power has increased among both Democrats and Republicans. However, Americans are still more likely to favor solar and wind power than nuclear power.

In 2023, a question about the usage of nuclear power was asked in Pat's Biggest Survey 2023, a poll where Pat Conaghan, the Australian federal member for the seat of Cowper in New South Wales and a member of the National Party polled residents of Cowper on national issues. When asked about how likely they were to support nuclear power, 47.30% were "very likely", 16.77% were "somewhat likely", 6.57% were "somewhat unlikely", 19.30% were "very unlikely" and 10.06% were unsure. This means that 64.07% of respondents supported the introduction of nuclear power, while 25.87% were opposed.

In Australia in 2023 Essential Report conducted a survey that found 50% of Australians supportive of nuclear energy, 33% against and 18% undecided.

In August 2023, a Gallup poll showed that 55% of Denmark's population is positive for nuclear power compared to 26% against.

In Finland, a survey by Kantar Public commissioned by Finnish Energy collected in March and April 2023 found 68% of respondents are in favour of nuclear power, while only 6% oppose. The majority of supporters of all political parties have a positive attitude towards nuclear power, including the Greens, with 52% support.

== 2024 ==
In Australia the Lowy Institute conducted a poll on various issues and found that 61% of Australians support nuclear energy with 37% against and 2% undecided.

== See also ==
- Public opinion on climate change
- Public opinion on nuclear power in Canada
- Public opinion on nuclear power in the United Kingdom
- Public opinion on nuclear power in the United States
- Nuclear power debate
- Nuclear weapons debate
- Uranium mining debate
