= Surface power density =

Power per area

In physics and engineering, surface power density is power per unit area.

== Applications ==
- The intensity of electromagnetic radiation can be expressed in W/m^{2}. An example of such a quantity is the solar constant.
- Wind turbines are often compared using a specific power measuring watts per square meter of turbine disk area, which is $\pi r^{2}$, where r is the length of a blade. This measure is also commonly used for solar panels, at least for typical applications.
- Radiance is surface power density per unit of solid angle (steradians) in a specific direction. Spectral radiance is radiance per unit of frequency (Hertz) at a specific (or as a function of) frequency, or per unit of wavelength (e.g. nm) at a specific (or as a function of) wavelength.

== Surface power densities of energy sources ==
Surface power density is an important factor in comparison of industrial energy sources. The concept was popularised by geographer Vaclav Smil. The term is usually shortened to "power density" in the relevant literature, which can lead to confusion with homonymous or related terms.

Measured in W/m^{2} it describes the amount of power obtained per unit of Earth surface area used by a specific energy system, including all supporting infrastructure, manufacturing, mining of fuel (if applicable) and decommissioning.^{,} Fossil fuels and nuclear power are characterized by high power density which means large power can be drawn from power plants occupying relatively small area. Renewable energy sources have power density at least three orders of magnitude smaller and for the same energy output they need to occupy accordingly larger area, which has been already highlighted as a limiting factor of renewable energy in German Energiewende.

The following table shows median surface power density of renewable and non-renewable energy sources.

| Energy source | Median PD [W/m^{2}] |
|---|---|
| Fossil gas | 482.10 |
| Nuclear power | 240.81 |
| Oil | 194.61 |
| Coal | 135.10 |
| Solar power | 6.63 |
| Geothermal | 2.24 |
| Wind power | 1.84 |
| Hydropower | 0.14 |
| Biomass | 0.08 |

== Background ==
As an electromagnetic wave travels through space, energy is transferred from the source to other objects (receivers). The rate of this energy transfer depends on the strength of the EM field components. Simply put, the rate of energy transfer per unit area (power density) is the product of the electric field strength (E) times the magnetic field strength (H).

Pd (Watts/meter^{2}) = E × H (Volts/meter × Amperes/meter), where
- Pd = the power density,
- E = the RMS electric field strength in volts per meter,
- H = the RMS magnetic field strength in amperes per meter.

The above equation yields units of W/m^{2} . In the USA the units of mW/cm^{2}, are more often used when making surveys. One mW/cm^{2} is the same power density as 10 W/m^{2}. The following equation can be used to obtain these units directly:

Pd = 0.1 × E × H mW/cm^{2}

The simplified relationships stated above apply at distances of about two or more wavelengths from the radiating source. This distance can be a far distance at low frequencies, and is called the far field. Here the ratio between E and H becomes a fixed constant (377 Ohms) and is called the characteristic impedance of free space. Under these conditions we can determine the power density by measuring only the E field component (or H field component, if you prefer) and calculating the power density from it.

This fixed relationship is useful for measuring radio frequency or microwave (electromagnetic) fields. Since power is the rate of energy transfer, and the squares of E and H are proportional to power, E^{2} and H^{2} are proportional to the energy transfer rate and the energy absorption of a given material. [??? This would imply that with no absorption, E and H are both zero, i.e. light or radio waves cannot travel in a vacuum. The intended meaning of this statement is unclear.]

=== Far field ===
The region extending farther than about 2 wavelengths away from the source is called the far field. As the source emits electromagnetic radiation of a given wavelength, the far-field electric component of the wave E, the far-field magnetic component H, and power density are related by the equations: E = H × 377 and Pd = E × H.

Pd = H^{2} × 377 and Pd = E^{2} ÷ 377

where Pd is the power density in watts per square meter (one W/m^{2} is equal to 0.1 mW/cm^{2}),
H^{2} = the square of the value of the magnetic field in amperes RMS squared per meter squared,
E^{2} = the square of the value of the electric field in volts RMS squared per meter squared.
