= Sustainable energy =

Energy that responsibly meets social, economic, and environmental needs

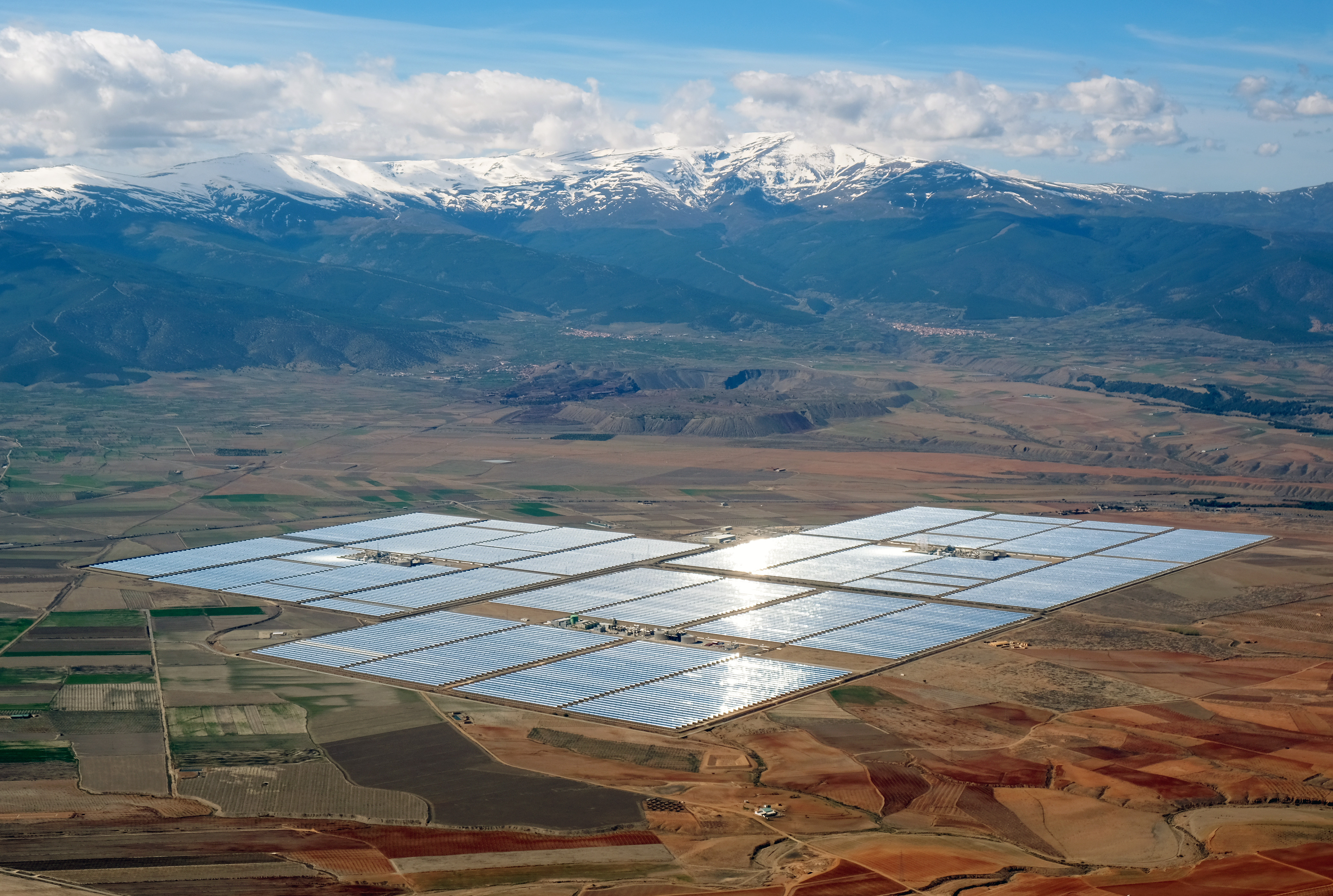
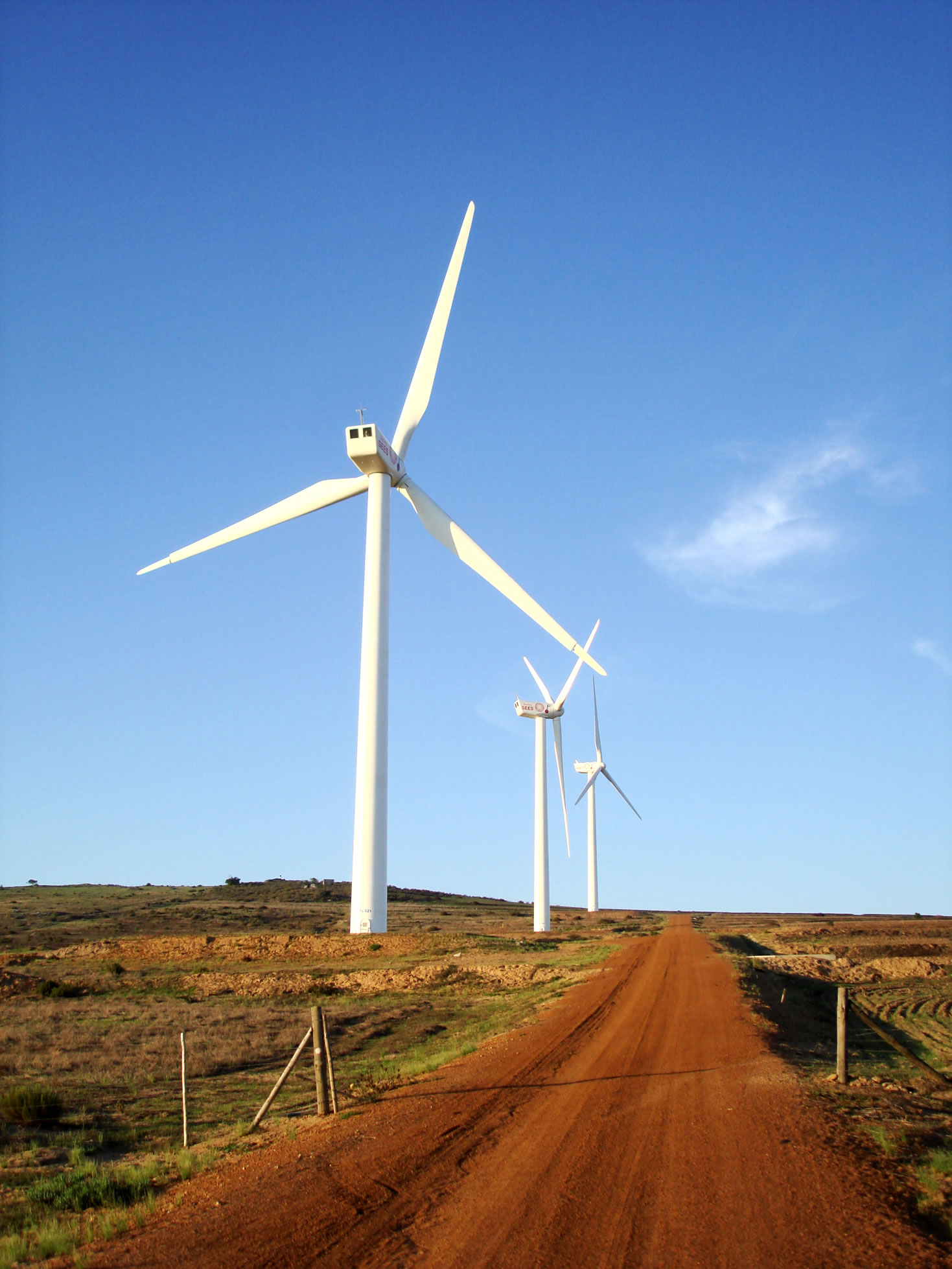
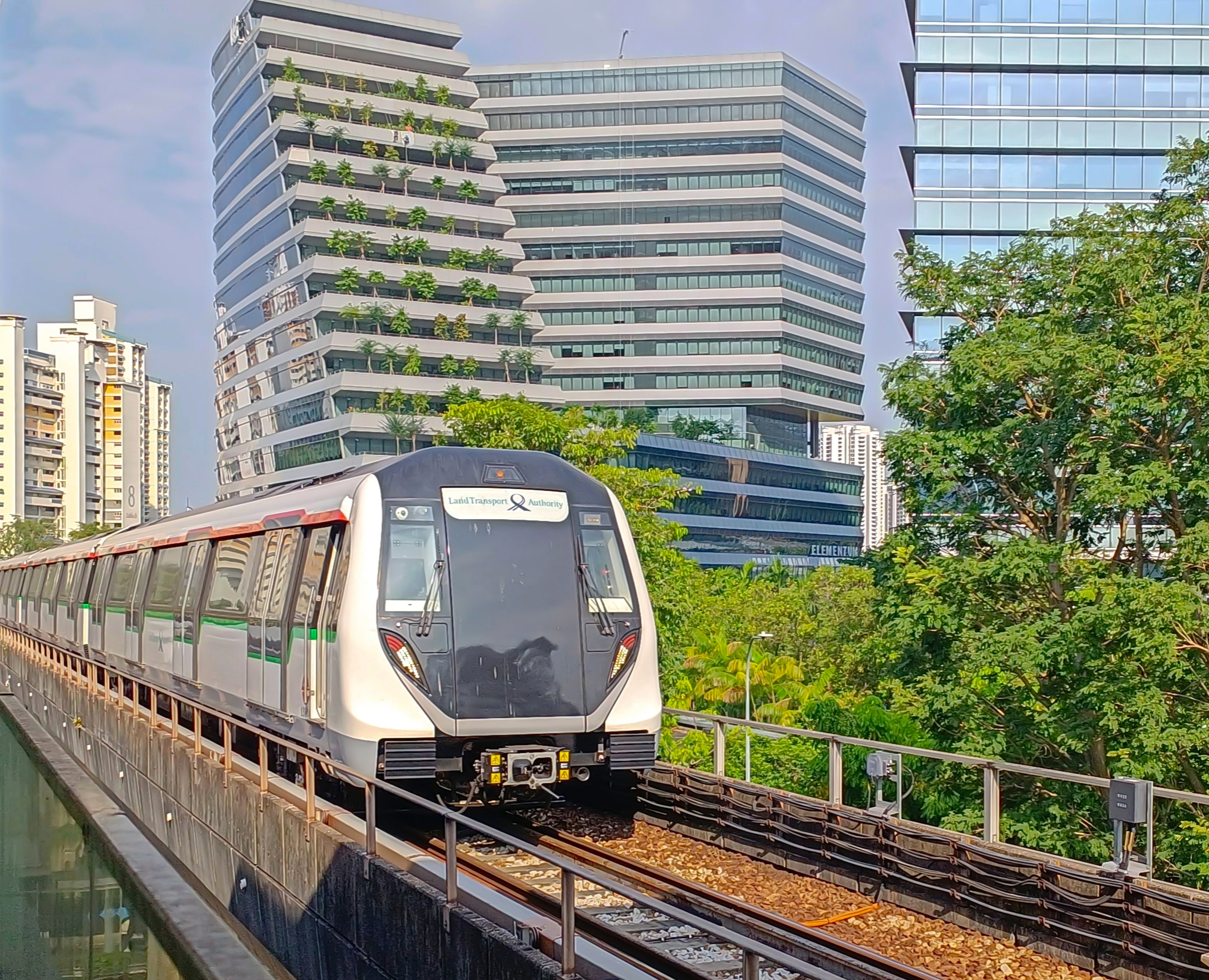
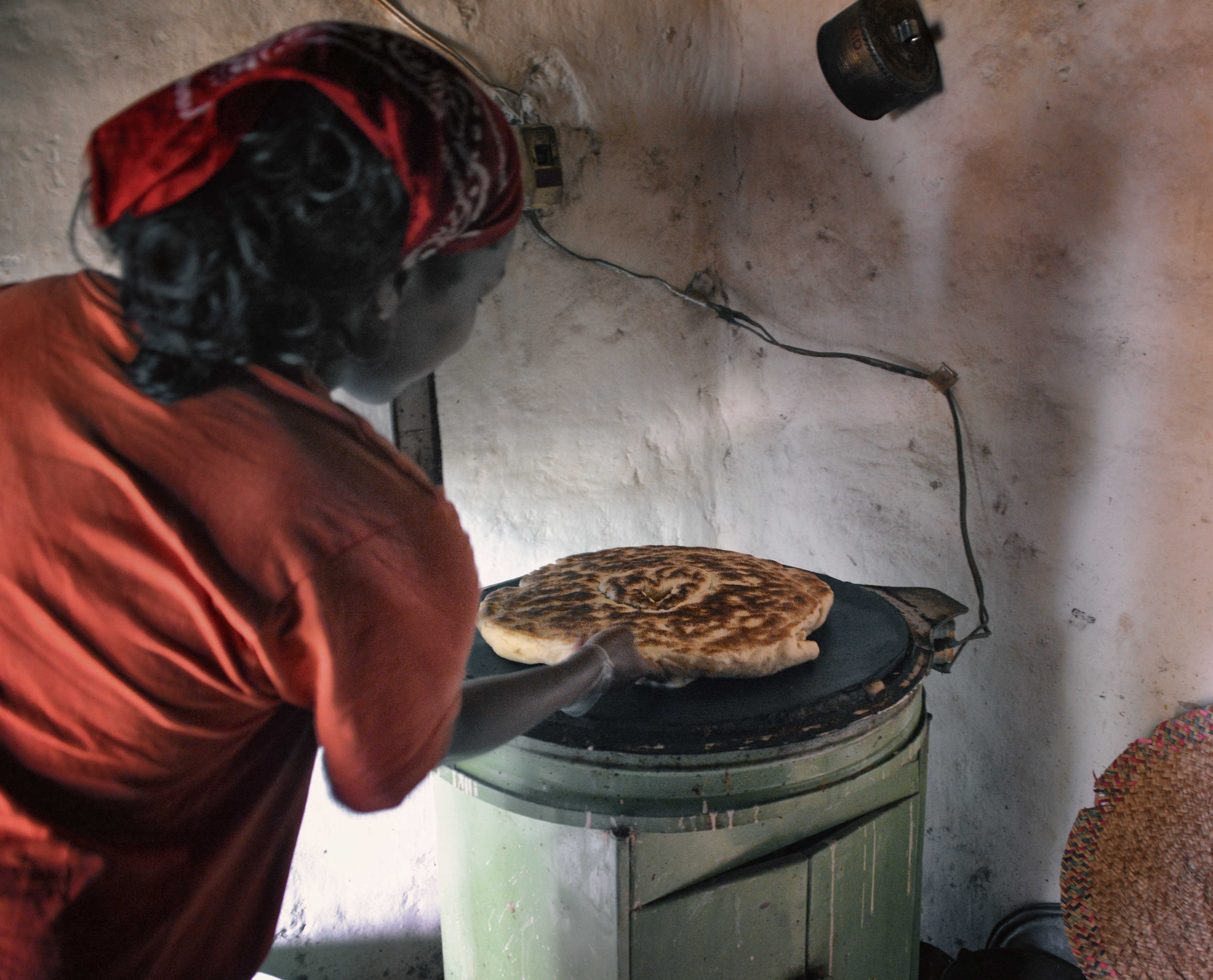
Sustainable energy examples: concentrated solar power with molten salt heat storage in Spain; wind energy in South Africa; electrified public transport in Singapore; and clean cooking in Ethiopia.

Energy is sustainable if it "meets the needs of the present without compromising the ability of future generations to meet their own needs." Definitions of sustainable energy usually look at its effects on the environment, the economy, and society. These impacts range from greenhouse gas emissions and air pollution to energy poverty and toxic waste. Renewable energy sources such as wind, hydro, solar, and geothermal energy can cause environmental damage but are generally far more sustainable than fossil fuel sources.

The role of non-renewable energy sources in sustainable energy is controversial. Nuclear power does not produce carbon pollution or air pollution, but has drawbacks that include radioactive waste, the risk of nuclear proliferation, and the risk of accidents. Switching from coal to natural gas has environmental benefits, including a lower climate impact, but may lead to a delay in switching to more sustainable options, being an example of carbon lock-in. Carbon capture and storage could be built into power plants to reduce their carbon dioxide (CO_{2}) emissions, but this technology is expensive and has rarely been implemented.

Fossil fuels provide 85% of the world's energy consumption, and the energy system is responsible for 76% of global greenhouse gas emissions. Around 790 million people in developing countries lack access to electricity, and 2.6 billion rely on polluting fuels such as wood or charcoal to cook. Cooking with biomass plus fossil fuel pollution causes an estimated 7 million deaths each year. Limiting global warming to 2 °C (3.6 °F) will require transforming energy production, distribution, storage, and consumption. Universal access to clean electricity can have major benefits to the climate, human health, and the economies of developing countries.

Climate change mitigation pathways have been proposed to limit global warming to 2 °C (3.6 °F). These include phasing out coal-fired power plants, conserving energy, producing more electricity from clean sources such as wind and solar, and switching from fossil fuels to electricity for transport and heating buildings. Power output from some renewable energy sources varies depending on when the wind blows and the sun shines. Switching to renewable energy can therefore require electrical grid upgrades, such as the addition of energy storage. Some processes that are difficult to electrify can use hydrogen fuel produced from low-emission energy sources. In the International Energy Agency's proposal for achieving net zero emissions by 2050, about 35% of the reduction in emissions depends on technologies that are still in development as of 2023.

Wind and solar market share grew to 8.5% of worldwide electricity in 2019, and costs continue to fall. The Intergovernmental Panel on Climate Change (IPCC) estimates that 2.5% of world gross domestic product (GDP) would need to be invested in the energy system each year between 2016 and 2035 to limit global warming to 1.5 °C (2.7 °F). Governments can fund the research, development, and demonstration of new clean energy technologies. They can also build infrastructure for electrification and sustainable transport. Finally, governments can encourage clean energy deployment with policies such as carbon pricing, renewable portfolio standards, and phase-outs of fossil fuel subsidies. These policies may also increase energy security.

== Definitions and background ==
Energy is the golden thread that connects economic growth, increased social equity, and an environment that allows the world to thrive. Development is not possible without energy, and sustainable development is not possible without sustainable energy."

— UN Secretary-General Ban Ki-moon

=== Definitions ===
The United Nations Brundtland Commission described the concept of sustainable development, for which energy is a key component, in its 1987 report Our Common Future. It defined sustainable development as meeting "the needs of the present without compromising the ability of future generations to meet their own needs". This description of sustainable development has since been referenced in many definitions and explanations of sustainable energy.

There is no universally accepted interpretation of how the concept of sustainability applies to energy on a global scale. Working definitions of sustainable energy encompass multiple dimensions of sustainability such as environmental, economic, and social dimensions. Historically, the concept of sustainable energy development has focused on emissions and on energy security. Since the early 1990s, the concept has broadened to encompass wider social and economic issues.

The environmental dimension of sustainability includes greenhouse gas emissions, impacts on biodiversity and ecosystems, hazardous waste and toxic emissions, water consumption, and depletion of non-renewable resources. Energy sources with low environmental impact are sometimes called green energy or clean energy. The economic dimension of sustainability covers economic development, efficient use of energy, and energy security to ensure that each country has constant access to sufficient energy. Social issues include access to affordable and reliable energy for all people, workers' rights, and land rights.

=== Environmental impacts ===
Deaths caused as a result of fossil fuel use (areas of rectangles in chart) greatly exceed those resulting from production of sustainable energy (rectangles barely visible in chart).

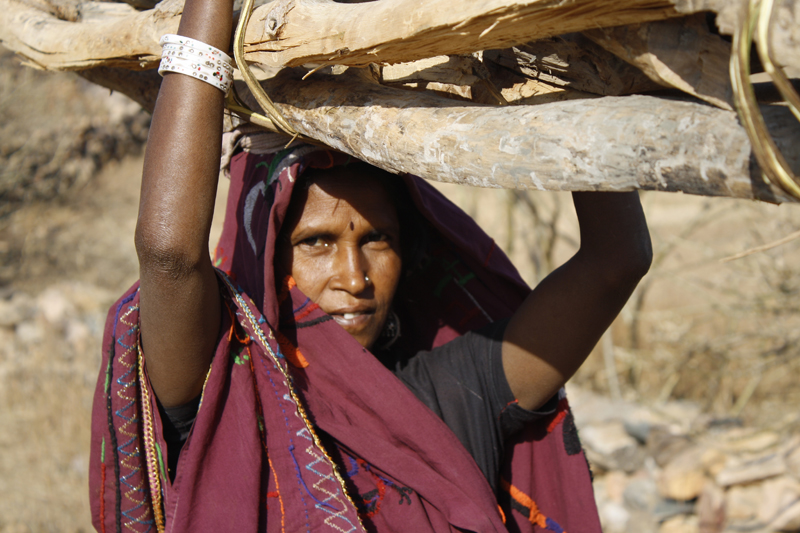
A woman in rural Rajasthan, India, collects firewood. The use of wood and other polluting fuels for cooking causes millions of deaths each year from indoor and outdoor air pollution.

The current energy system contributes to many environmental problems, including climate change, air pollution, biodiversity loss, the release of toxins into the environment, and water scarcity. As of 2019, 85% of the world's energy needs are met by burning fossil fuels. Energy production and consumption are responsible for 76% of annual human-caused greenhouse gas emissions as of 2018. The 2015 international Paris Agreement on climate change aims to limit global warming to well below 2 °C (3.6 °F) and preferably to 1.5 °C (2.7 °F); achieving this goal will require that emissions be reduced as soon as possible and reach net-zero by mid-century.

The burning of fossil fuels and biomass is a major source of air pollution, which causes an estimated 7 million deaths each year, with the greatest attributable disease burden seen in low and middle-income countries. Fossil-fuel burning in power plants, vehicles, and factories is the main source of emissions that combine with oxygen in the atmosphere to cause acid rain. Air pollution is the second-leading cause of death from non-infectious disease. An estimated 99% of the world's population lives with levels of air pollution that exceed the World Health Organization recommended limits.

Cooking with polluting fuels such as wood, animal dung, coal, or kerosene is responsible for nearly all indoor air pollution, which causes an estimated 1.6 to 3.8 million deaths annually, and also contributes significantly to outdoor air pollution. Health effects are concentrated among women, who are likely to be responsible for cooking, and young children.

Environmental impacts extend beyond the by-products of combustion. Oil spills at sea harm marine life and may cause fires which release toxic emissions. Around 10% of global water use goes to energy production, mainly for cooling in thermal energy plants. In dry regions, this contributes to water scarcity. Bioenergy production, coal mining and processing, and oil extraction also require large amounts of water. Excessive harvesting of wood and other combustible material for burning can cause serious local environmental damage, including desertification.

=== Sustainable development goals ===
World map showing where people without access to electricity lived in 2016—mainly in sub-Saharan Africa and the Indian subcontinent

Meeting existing and future energy demands in a sustainable way is a critical challenge for the global goal of limiting climate change while maintaining economic growth and enabling living standards to rise. Reliable and affordable energy, particularly electricity, is essential for health care, education, and economic development. Energy poverty is a multidimensional problem affecting people's ability to meet basic energy needs. Some needs being for lighting, heating, and cooking. As of 2020, 790 million people in developing countries do not have access to electricity, and around 2.6 billion rely on burning polluting fuels for cooking.

Improving energy access in the least-developed countries and making energy cleaner are key to achieving most of the United Nations 2030 Sustainable Development Goals, which cover issues ranging from climate action to gender equality. Sustainable Development Goal 7 calls for "access to affordable, reliable, sustainable and modern energy for all", including universal access to electricity and to clean cooking facilities by 2030.

== Energy conservation ==
Global energy usage is highly unequal. High income countries such as the United States and Canada use 100 times as much energy per capita as some of the least developed countries in Africa.

Energy efficiency—using less energy to deliver the same goods or services, or delivering comparable services with less goods—is a cornerstone of many sustainable energy strategies. The International Energy Agency (IEA) has estimated that increasing energy efficiency could achieve 40% of greenhouse gas emission reductions needed to fulfil the Paris Agreement's goals.

Energy can be conserved by increasing the technical efficiency of appliances, vehicles, industrial processes, and buildings. Another approach is to use fewer materials whose production requires a lot of energy, for example through better building design and recycling. Behavioural changes such as using videoconferencing rather than business flights, or making urban trips by cycling, walking or public transport rather than by car, are another way to conserve energy. Government policies to improve efficiency can include building codes, performance standards, carbon pricing, and the development of energy-efficient infrastructure to encourage changes in transport modes.

The energy intensity of the global economy (the amount of energy consumed per unit of gross domestic product (GDP)) is a rough indicator of the energy efficiency of economic production. In 2010, global energy intensity was 5.6 megajoules (1.6 kWh) per US dollar of GDP. United Nations goals call for energy intensity to decrease by 2.6% each year between 2010 and 2030. In recent years this target has not been met. For instance, between 2017 and 2018, energy intensity decreased by only 1.1%.

Efficiency improvements often lead to a rebound effect in which consumers use the money they save to buy more energy-intensive goods and services. For example, recent technical efficiency improvements in transport and buildings have been largely offset by trends in consumer behaviour, such as selecting larger vehicles and homes.

== Sustainable energy sources ==
=== Renewable energy sources ===
In 2023, electricity generation from wind and solar sources was projected to exceed 30% by 2030.

Renewable energy capacity has steadily grown, led by solar photovoltaic power.

Solar and wind power are scaling up faster than previous sources of electricity. Declining costs, modular design, and improved battery storage help the transition to renewable energy.

Clean energy investment has benefited from post-pandemic economic recovery, a global energy crisis involving high fossil fuel prices, and growing policy support across various nations. By 2025, investment in the energy transition had grown to about twice that for fossil fuels (oil, natural gas and coal).

Renewable energy sources are essential to sustainable energy, as they generally strengthen energy security and emit far fewer greenhouse gases than fossil fuels. Renewable energy projects sometimes raise significant sustainability concerns, such as risks to biodiversity when areas of high ecological value are converted to bioenergy production or wind or solar farms.

Hydropower is the largest source of renewable electricity while solar and wind energy are growing rapidly. Photovoltaic solar and onshore wind are the cheapest forms of new power generation capacity in most countries. For more than half of the 770 million people who currently lack access to electricity, decentralised renewable energy such as solar-powered mini-grids is likely the cheapest method of providing it by 2030. United Nations targets for 2030 include substantially increasing the proportion of renewable energy in the world's energy supply.

According to the International Energy Agency (IEA), renewable energy sources like wind and solar power are now a commonplace source of electricity, making up 70% of all new investments made in the world's power generation. The IEA's World Energy Investment 2025 said that spending on low-emissions power generation almost doubled over the preceding five years, led by solar photovoltaics, and that capital investment in the energy sector would rise to $3.3 trillion in 2025 despite geopolitical tensions and economic uncertainty.

==== Solar ====
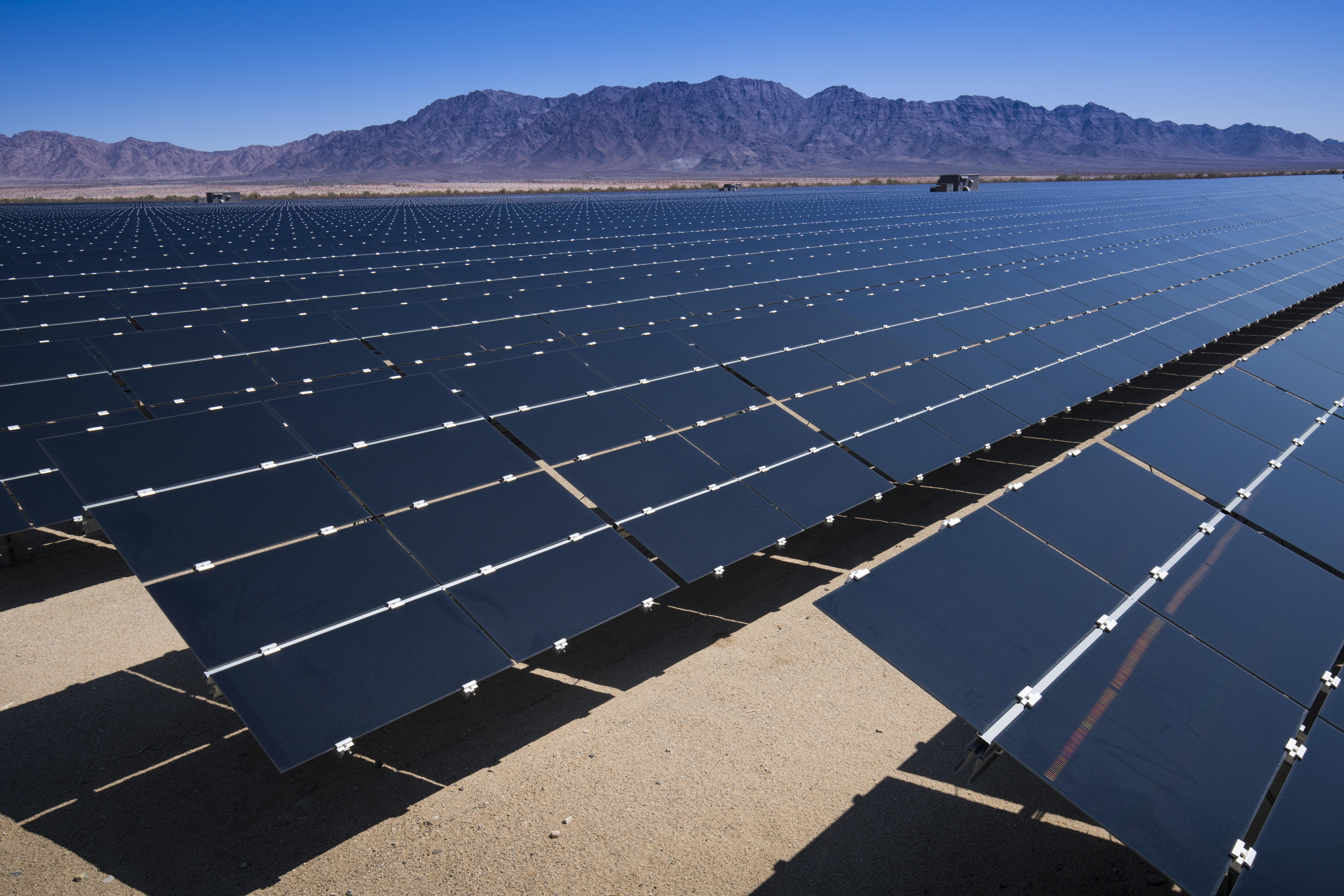
A photovoltaic power station in California, United States

The Sun is Earth's primary source of energy, a clean and abundantly available resource in many regions. In 2019, solar power provided around 3% of global electricity, mostly through solar panels based on photovoltaic cells (PV). Solar PV is expected to be the electricity source with the largest installed capacity worldwide by 2027. The panels are mounted on top of buildings or installed in utility-scale solar parks. Costs of solar photovoltaic cells have dropped rapidly, driving strong growth in worldwide capacity. The cost of electricity from new solar farms is competitive with, or in many places, cheaper than electricity from existing coal plants. Various projections of future energy use identify solar PV as one of the main sources of energy generation in a sustainable mix.

Most components of solar panels can be easily recycled, but this is not always done in the absence of regulation. Panels typically contain heavy metals, so they pose environmental risks if put in landfills. It takes fewer than two years for a solar panel to produce as much energy as was used for its production. Less energy is needed if materials are recycled rather than mined.

In concentrated solar power, solar rays are concentrated by a field of mirrors, heating a fluid. Electricity is produced from the resulting steam with a heat engine. Concentrated solar power can support dispatchable power generation, as some of the heat is typically stored to enable electricity to be generated when needed. In addition to electricity production, solar energy is used more directly; solar thermal heating systems are used for hot water production, heating buildings, drying, and desalination.

==== Wind power ====
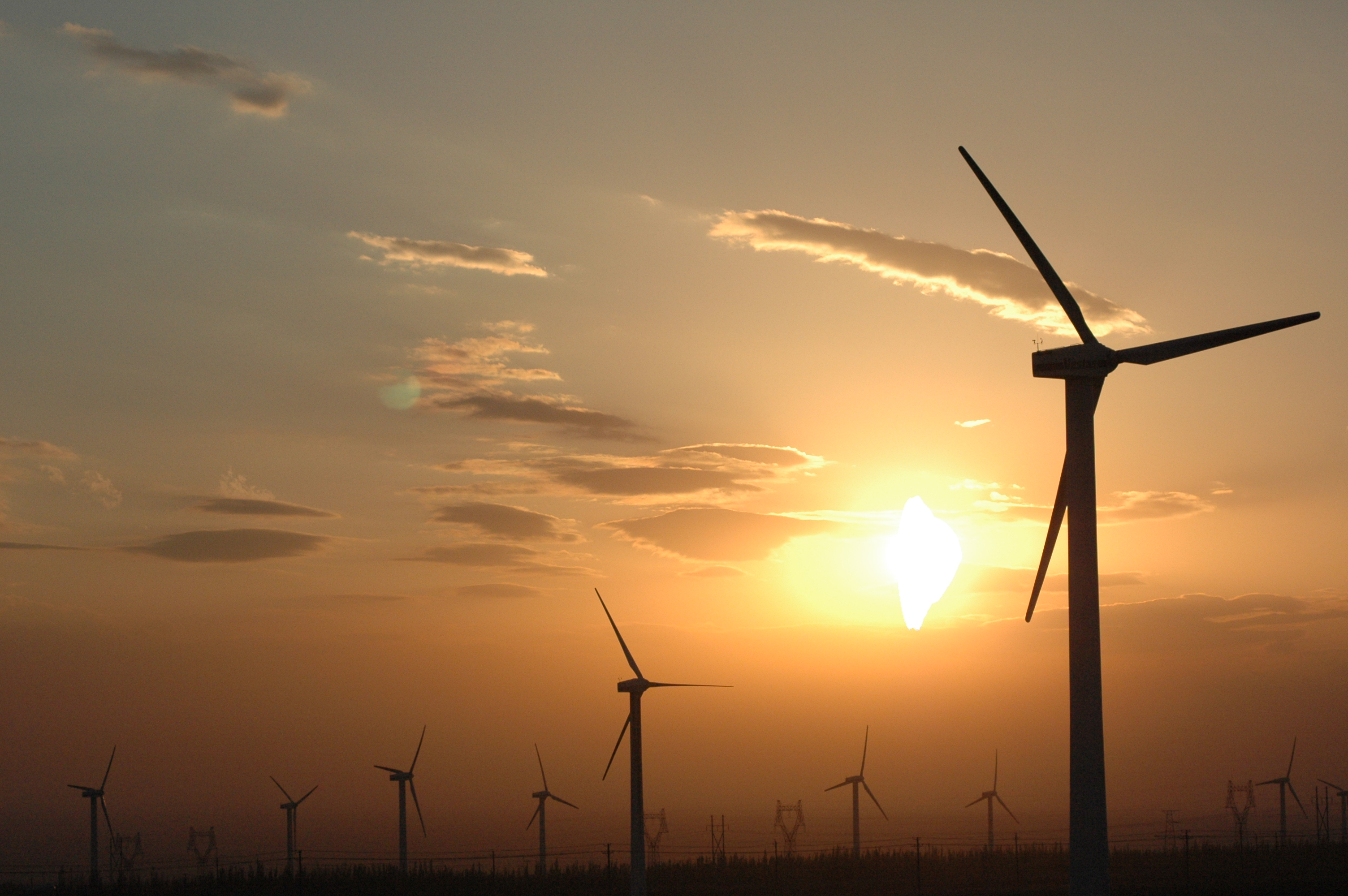
Wind turbines in Xinjiang, China

Wind has been an important driver of development over millennia, providing mechanical energy for industrial processes, water pumps, and sailing ships. Modern wind turbines are used to generate electricity and provided well over 10% of global electricity in 2024. Electricity from onshore wind farms is often cheaper than existing coal plants and competitive with natural gas and nuclear. Wind turbines can also be placed offshore, where winds are steadier and stronger than on land, but construction and maintenance costs are higher.

Onshore wind farms, often built in wild or rural areas, have a visual impact on the landscape. Hundreds of wind turbines are often grouped together create wind farms. Placing them in one location will lower cost of grid connect and location development. While collisions with wind turbines kill both bats and to a lesser extent birds, these impacts are lower than from other infrastructure such as windows and transmission lines. The noise and flickering light created by the turbines can cause annoyance and constrain construction near densely populated areas. Wind power, in contrast to nuclear and fossil fuel plants, does not consume water. Little energy is needed for wind turbine construction compared to the energy produced by the wind power plant itself. Turbine blades are not fully recyclable, and research into methods of manufacturing easier-to-recycle blades is ongoing.

==== Hydropower ====
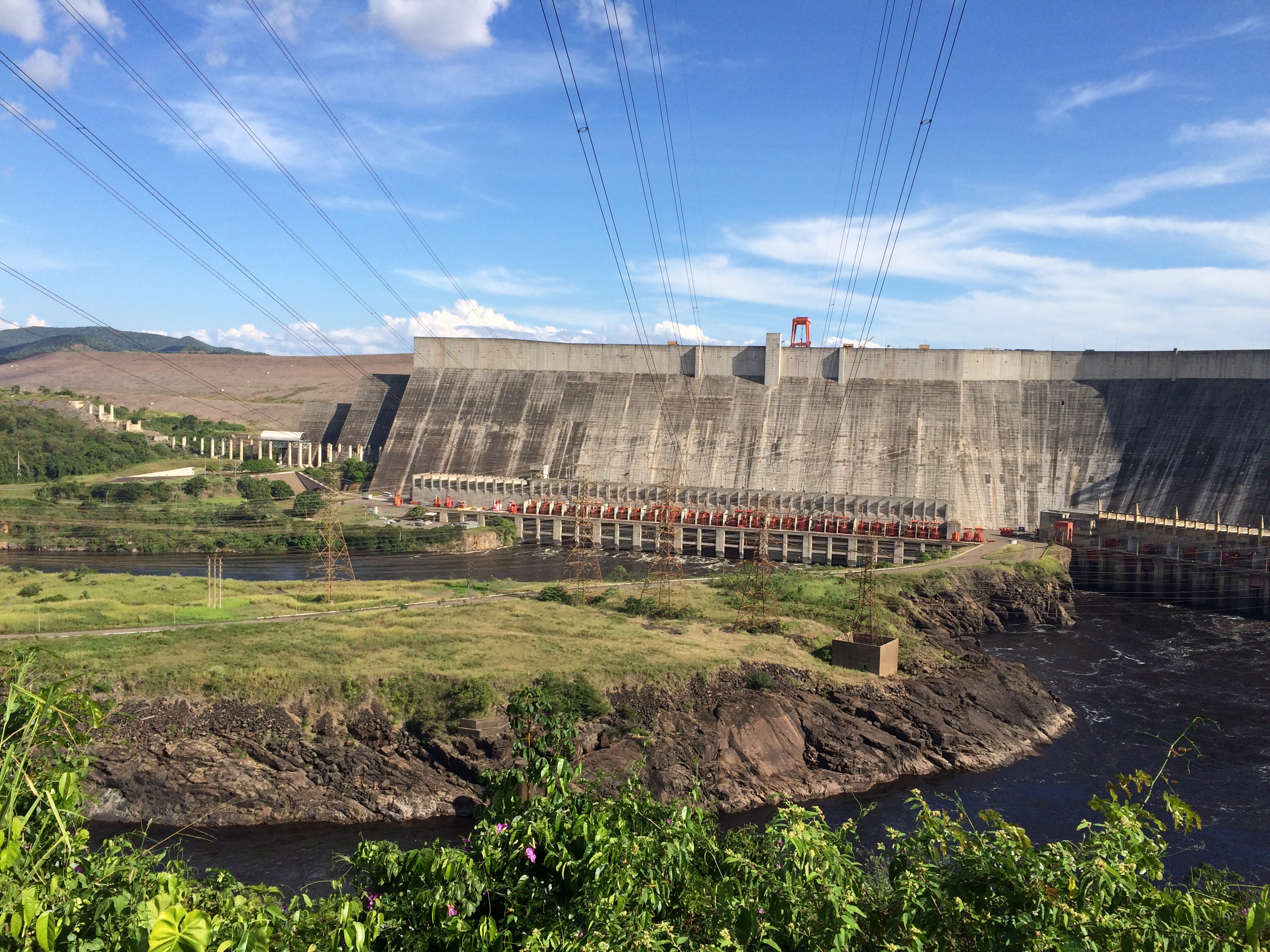
Guri Dam, a hydroelectric dam in Venezuela

Hydroelectric plants convert the energy of moving water into electricity. In 2020, hydropower supplied 17% of the world's electricity, down from a high of nearly 20% in the mid-to-late 20th century.

In conventional hydropower, a reservoir is created behind a dam. Conventional hydropower plants provide a highly flexible, dispatchable electricity supply. They can be combined with wind and solar power to meet peaks in demand and to compensate when wind and sun are less available.

Compared to reservoir-based facilities, run-of-the-river hydroelectricity generally has less environmental impact. However, its ability to generate power depends on river flow, which can vary with daily and seasonal weather. Reservoirs provide water quantity controls that are used for flood control and flexible electricity output while also providing security during drought for drinking water supply and irrigation.

Hydropower ranks among the energy sources with the lowest levels of greenhouse gas emissions per unit of energy produced, but levels of emissions vary enormously between projects. The highest emissions tend to occur with large dams in tropical regions. These emissions are produced when the biological matter that becomes submerged in the reservoir's flooding decomposes and releases carbon dioxide and methane. Deforestation and climate change can reduce energy generation from hydroelectric dams. Depending on location, large dams can displace residents and cause significant local environmental damage; potential dam failure could place the surrounding population at risk.

==== Geothermal ====
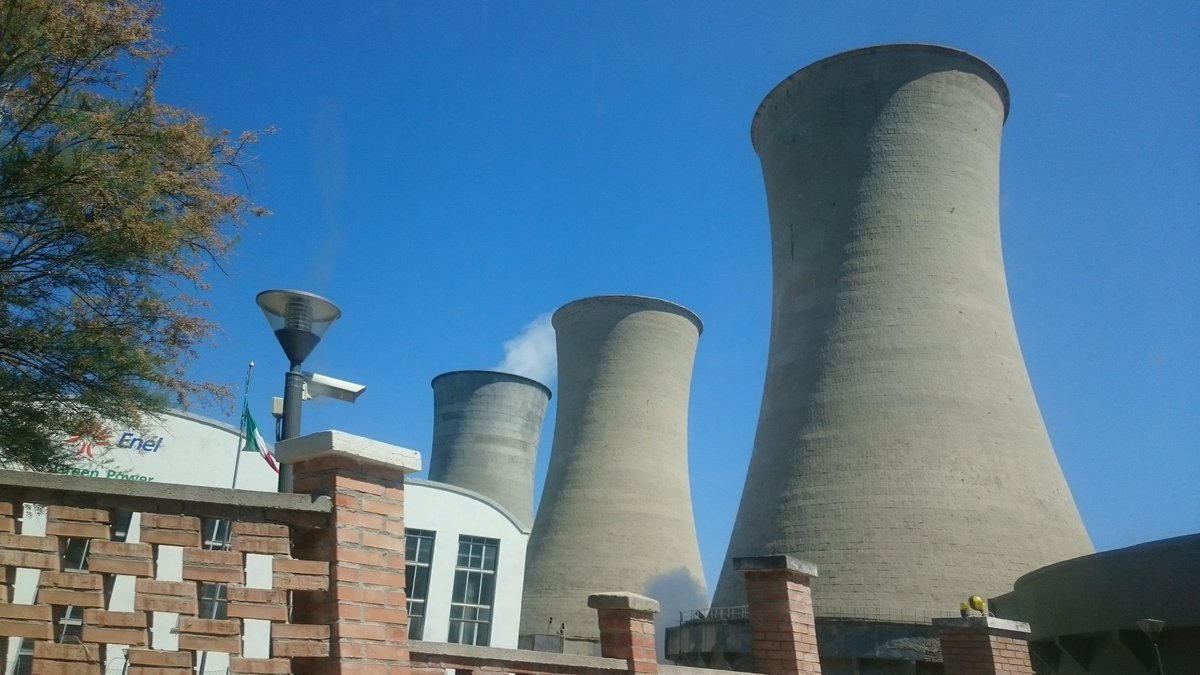
Cooling towers at a geothermal power plant in Larderello, Italy.

Geothermal energy is produced by tapping into deep underground heat and harnessing it to generate electricity or to heat water and buildings. The use of geothermal energy is concentrated in regions where heat extraction is economical: a combination is needed of high temperatures, heat flow, and permeability (the ability of the rock to allow fluids to pass through). Power is produced from the steam created in underground reservoirs. Geothermal energy provided less than 1% of global energy consumption in 2020.

Geothermal energy is a renewable resource because thermal energy is constantly replenished from neighbouring hotter regions and the radioactive decay of naturally occurring isotopes. On average, the greenhouse gas emissions of geothermal-based electricity are less than 5% that of coal-based electricity. Geothermal energy carries a risk of inducing earthquakes, needs effective protection to avoid water pollution, and releases toxic emissions which can be captured.

==== Bioenergy ====
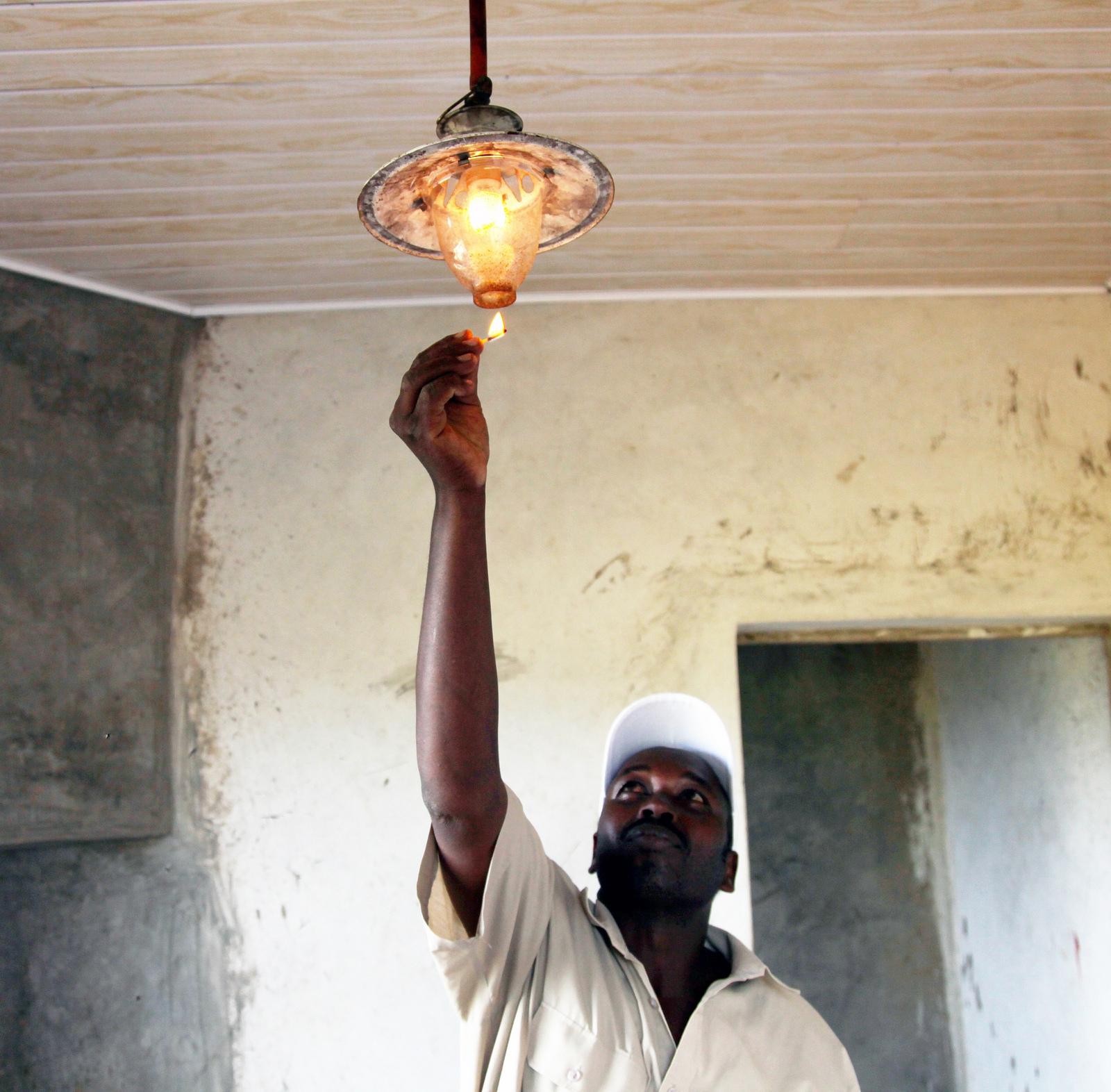
Kenyan dairy farmer lighting a biogas lamp. Biogas produced from biomass is a renewable energy source that can be burned for cooking or light.

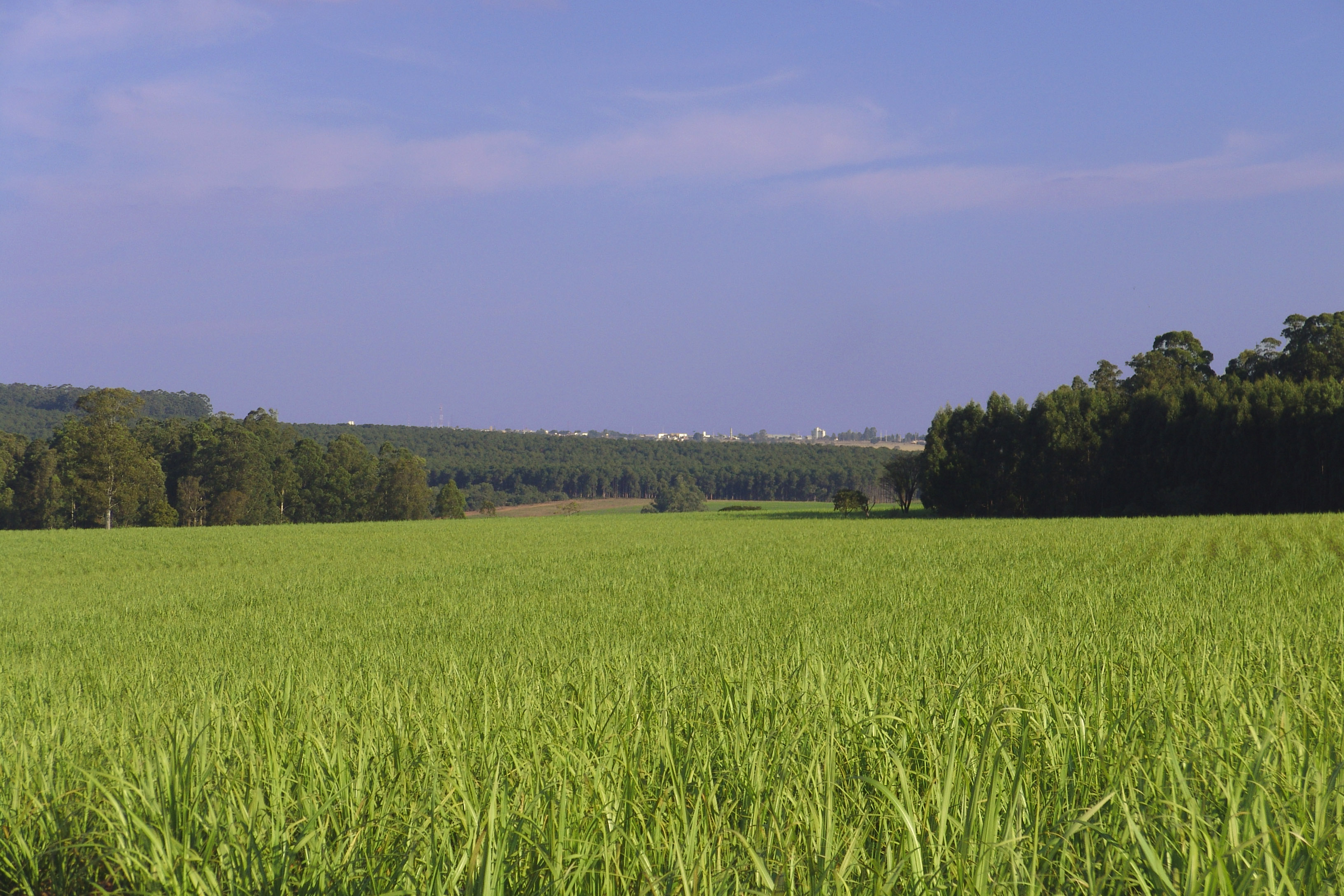
A sugarcane plantation to produce ethanol in Brazil.

Biomass is renewable organic material that comes from plants and animals. It can either be burned to produce heat and electricity or be converted into biofuels such as biodiesel and ethanol, which can be used to power vehicles.

The climate impact of bioenergy varies considerably depending on where biomass feedstocks come from and how they are grown. For example, burning wood for energy releases carbon dioxide; those emissions can be significantly offset if the trees that were harvested are replaced by new trees in a well-managed forest, as the new trees will absorb carbon dioxide from the air as they grow. However, the establishment and cultivation of bioenergy crops can displace natural ecosystems, degrade soils, and consume water resources and synthetic fertilisers.

Approximately one-third of all wood used for traditional heating and cooking in tropical areas is harvested unsustainably. Bioenergy feedstocks typically require significant amounts of energy to harvest, dry, and transport; the energy usage for these processes may emit greenhouse gases. In some cases, the impacts of land-use change, cultivation, and processing can result in higher overall carbon emissions for bioenergy compared to using fossil fuels.

Use of farmland for growing biomass can result in less land being available for growing food. In the United States, around 10% of motor gasoline has been replaced by corn-based ethanol, which requires a significant proportion of the harvest. In Malaysia and Indonesia, clearing forests to produce palm oil for biodiesel has led to serious social and environmental effects, as these forests are critical carbon sinks and habitats for diverse species. Since photosynthesis captures only a small fraction of the energy in sunlight, producing a given amount of bioenergy requires a large amount of land compared to other renewable energy sources.

Second-generation biofuels which are produced from non-food plants or waste reduce competition with food production, but may have other negative effects including trade-offs with conservation areas and local air pollution. Relatively sustainable sources of biomass include algae, waste, and crops grown on soil unsuitable for food production.

Carbon capture and storage technology can be used to capture emissions from bioenergy power plants. This process is known as bioenergy with carbon capture and storage (BECCS) and can result in net carbon dioxide removal from the atmosphere. However, BECCS can also result in net positive emissions depending on how the biomass material is grown, harvested, and transported. Deployment of BECCS at scales described in some climate change mitigation pathways would require converting large amounts of cropland.

==== Marine energy ====
Marine energy has the smallest share of the energy market. It includes OTEC, tidal power, which is approaching maturity, and wave power, which is earlier in its development. Two tidal barrage systems in France and in South Korea make up 90% of global production. While single marine energy devices pose little risk to the environment, the impacts of larger devices are less well known.

=== Non-renewable energy sources ===
==== Fossil fuel switching and mitigation ====
Switching from coal to natural gas has advantages in terms of sustainability. For a given unit of energy produced, the life-cycle greenhouse-gas emissions of natural gas are around 40 times the emissions of wind or nuclear energy but are much less than coal. Burning natural gas produces around half the emissions of coal when used to generate electricity and around two-thirds the emissions of coal when used to produce heat. Natural gas combustion also produces less air pollution than coal. However, natural gas is a potent greenhouse gas in itself, and leaks during extraction and transportation can negate the advantages of switching away from coal. The technology to curb methane leaks is widely available but it is not always used.

Switching from coal to natural gas reduces emissions in the short term and thus contributes to climate change mitigation. However, in the long term it does not provide a path to net-zero emissions. Developing natural gas infrastructure risks carbon lock-in and stranded assets, where new fossil infrastructure either commits to decades of carbon emissions, or has to be written off before it makes a profit.

The greenhouse gas emissions of fossil fuel and biomass power plants can be significantly reduced through carbon capture and storage (CCS). Most studies use a working assumption that CCS can capture 85–90% of the carbon dioxide (CO_{2}) emissions from a power plant. Even if 90% of emitted CO_{2} is captured from a coal-fired power plant, its uncaptured emissions are still many times greater than the emissions of nuclear, solar or wind energy per unit of electricity produced.

Since coal plants using CCS are less efficient, they require more coal and thus increase the pollution associated with mining and transporting coal. CCS is one of the most expensive ways of reducing emissions in the energy sector. Deployment of this technology is very limited. As of 2024, CCS is used in only 5 power plants and in 39 other facilities.

==== Nuclear power ====
Since 1985, the proportion of electricity generated from low-carbon sources has increased only slightly. Advances in deploying renewables have been mostly offset by declining shares of nuclear power.

Nuclear power has been used since the 1950s as a low-carbon source of baseload electricity. Nuclear power plants in over 30 countries generate about 10% of global electricity. As of 2019, nuclear generated over a quarter of all low-carbon energy, making it the second largest source after hydropower.

Nuclear power's lifecycle greenhouse gas emissions—including the mining and processing of uranium—are similar to the emissions from renewable energy sources. Nuclear power uses little land per unit of energy produced, compared to the major renewables. Additionally, nuclear power does not create local air pollution. Although the uranium ore used to fuel nuclear power plants is a non-renewable resource, enough exists to provide a supply for hundreds to thousands of years. However, uranium resources that can be accessed in an economically feasible manner, at the present state, are limited and uranium production could hardly keep up during the expansion phase. Climate change mitigation pathways consistent with ambitious goals typically see an increase in power supply from nuclear.

There is controversy over whether nuclear power is sustainable, in part due to concerns around nuclear waste, nuclear weapon proliferation, and accidents. Radioactive nuclear waste must be managed for thousands of years. For each unit of energy produced, nuclear energy has caused far fewer accidental and pollution-related deaths than fossil fuels, and the historic fatality rate of nuclear is comparable to renewable sources. Public opposition to nuclear energy often makes nuclear plants politically difficult to implement.

Reducing the time and the cost of building new nuclear plants have been goals for decades but costs remain high and timescales long. Various new forms of nuclear energy are in development, hoping to address the drawbacks of conventional plants. Fast breeder reactors are capable of recycling nuclear waste and therefore can significantly reduce the amount of waste that requires geological disposal, but have not yet been deployed on a large-scale commercial basis. Nuclear power based on thorium (rather than uranium) may be able to provide higher energy security for countries that do not have a large supply of uranium. Small modular reactors may have several advantages over current large reactors: It should be possible to build them faster and their modularization would allow for cost reductions via learning-by-doing. They are also considered safer to use than traditional power plants.

Several countries are attempting to develop nuclear fusion reactors, which would generate small amounts of waste and no risk of explosions. Although fusion power has taken steps forward in the lab, the multi-decade timescale needed to bring it to commercialization and then scale means it will not contribute to a 2050 net zero goal for climate change mitigation.

== Energy system transformation ==
Production of technology such as renewable energy sources starts a positive feedback loop to form what has been called a virtuous cycle—the opposite of a vicious cycle. For example, as more and more solar modules are deployed, prices fall because of the economies of scale, allowing the technology to become cost-competitive in new applications that in turn increase demand for more deployment.

By 2025, investment in the energy transition had grown to about twice that for fossil fuels (oil, natural gas and coal).

In 2025, growth in solar, wind and other low-carbon electric power exceeded the overall growth in demand for electricity, reducing reliance on fossil fuels and helping to curb greenhouse gas emissions.

=== Decarbonisation of the global energy system ===
The emissions reductions necessary to keep global warming below 2 °C will require a system-wide transformation of the way energy is produced, distributed, stored, and consumed. For a society to replace one form of energy with another, multiple technologies and behaviours in the energy system must change. For example, transitioning from oil to solar power as the energy source for cars requires the generation of solar electricity, modifications to the electrical grid to accommodate fluctuations in solar panel output or the introduction of variable battery chargers and higher overall demand, adoption of electric cars, and networks of electric vehicle charging facilities and repair shops.

Many climate change mitigation pathways envision three main aspects of a low-carbon energy system:

- The use of low-emission energy sources to produce electricity
- Electrification – that is increased use of electricity instead of directly burning fossil fuels
- Accelerated adoption of energy efficiency measures

Some energy-intensive technologies and processes are difficult to electrify, including aviation, shipping, and steelmaking. There are several options for reducing the emissions from these sectors: biofuels and synthetic carbon-neutral fuels can power many vehicles that are designed to burn fossil fuels, however biofuels cannot be sustainably produced in the quantities needed and synthetic fuels are currently very expensive. For some applications, the most prominent alternative to electrification is to develop a system based on sustainably-produced hydrogen fuel.

Full decarbonisation of the global energy system is expected to take several decades and can mostly be achieved with existing technologies. In the IEA's proposal for achieving net zero emissions by 2050, about 35% of the reduction in emissions depends on technologies that are still in development as of 2023. Technologies that are relatively immature include batteries and processes to create carbon-neutral fuels. Developing new technologies requires research and development, demonstration, and cost reductions via deployment.

The transition to a zero-carbon energy system will bring strong co-benefits for human health: The World Health Organization estimates that efforts to limit global warming to 1.5 °C could save millions of lives each year from reductions to air pollution alone. With good planning and management, pathways exist to provide universal access to electricity and clean cooking by 2030 in ways that are consistent with climate goals. Historically, several countries have made rapid economic gains through coal usage. However, there remains a window of opportunity for many poor countries and regions to "leapfrog" fossil fuel dependency by developing their energy systems based on renewables, given adequate international investment and knowledge transfer.

=== Integrating variable energy sources ===
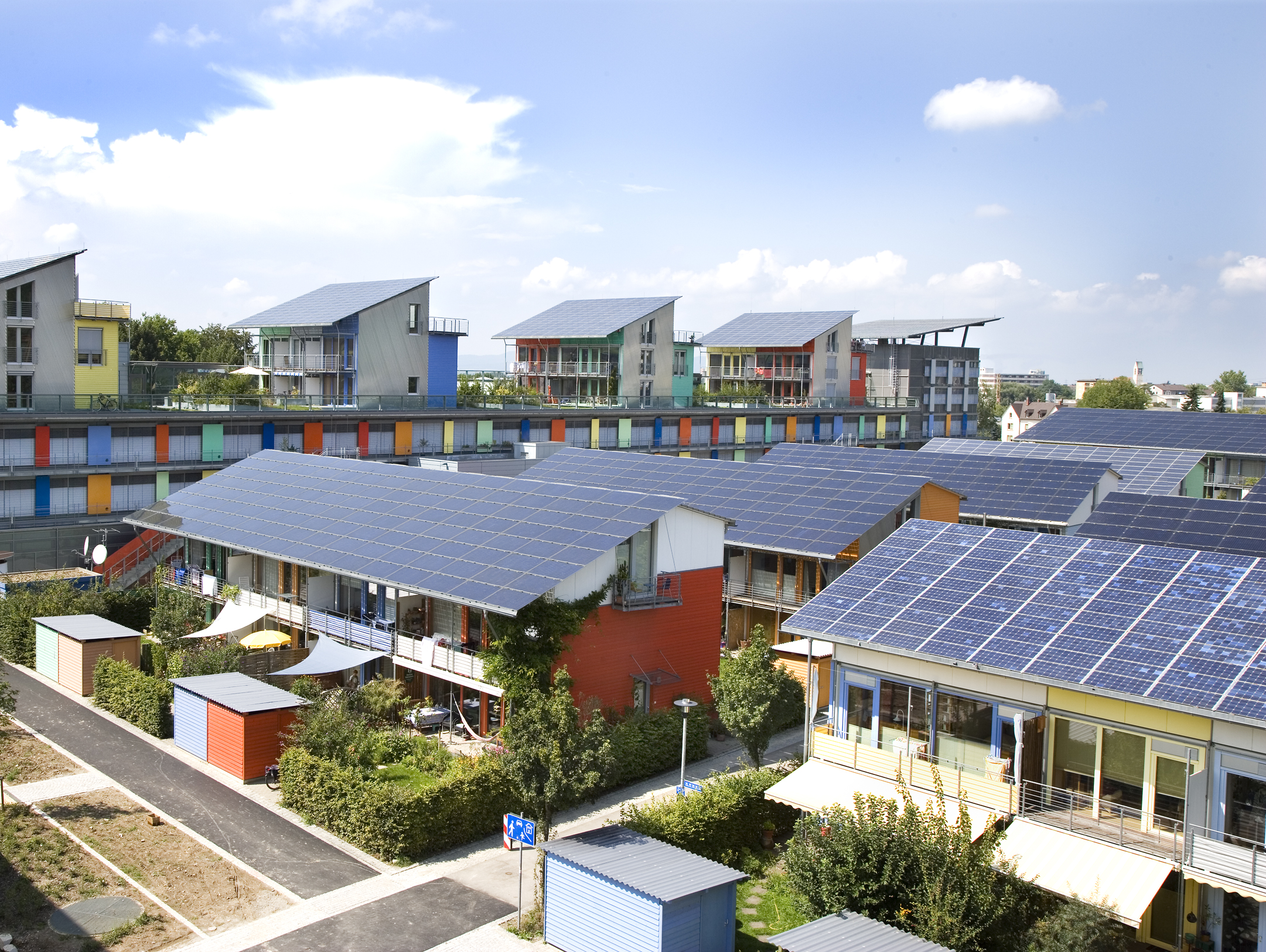
Buildings in the Solar Settlement at Schlierberg, Germany, produce more energy than they consume. They incorporate rooftop solar panels and are built for maximum energy efficiency.

To deliver reliable electricity from variable renewable energy sources such as wind and solar, electrical power systems require flexibility. Most electrical grids were constructed for non-intermittent energy sources such as coal-fired power plants. As larger amounts of solar and wind energy are integrated into the grid, changes have to be made to the energy system to ensure that the supply of electricity is matched to demand. In 2019, these sources generated 8.5% of worldwide electricity, a share that has grown rapidly.

There are various ways to make the electricity system more flexible. In many places, wind and solar generation are complementary on a daily and a seasonal scale: there is more wind during the night and in winter when solar energy production is low. Linking different geographical regions through long-distance transmission lines allows for further cancelling out of variability. Energy demand can be shifted in time through energy demand management and the use of smart grids, matching the times when variable energy production is highest. With grid energy storage, energy produced in excess can be released when needed. Further flexibility could be provided from sector coupling, that is coupling the electricity sector to the heat and mobility sector via power-to-heat-systems and electric vehicles.

Building overcapacity for wind and solar generation can help ensure that enough electricity is produced even during poor weather. In optimal weather, energy generation may have to be curtailed if excess electricity cannot be used or stored. The final demand-supply mismatch may be covered by using dispatchable energy sources such as hydropower, bioenergy, or natural gas.

==== Energy storage ====
Energy from renewable sources is converted to potential energy that is stored in devices such as electric batteries. The stored potential energy is later converted to electricity and added to the power grid, even when the original source is unavailable.

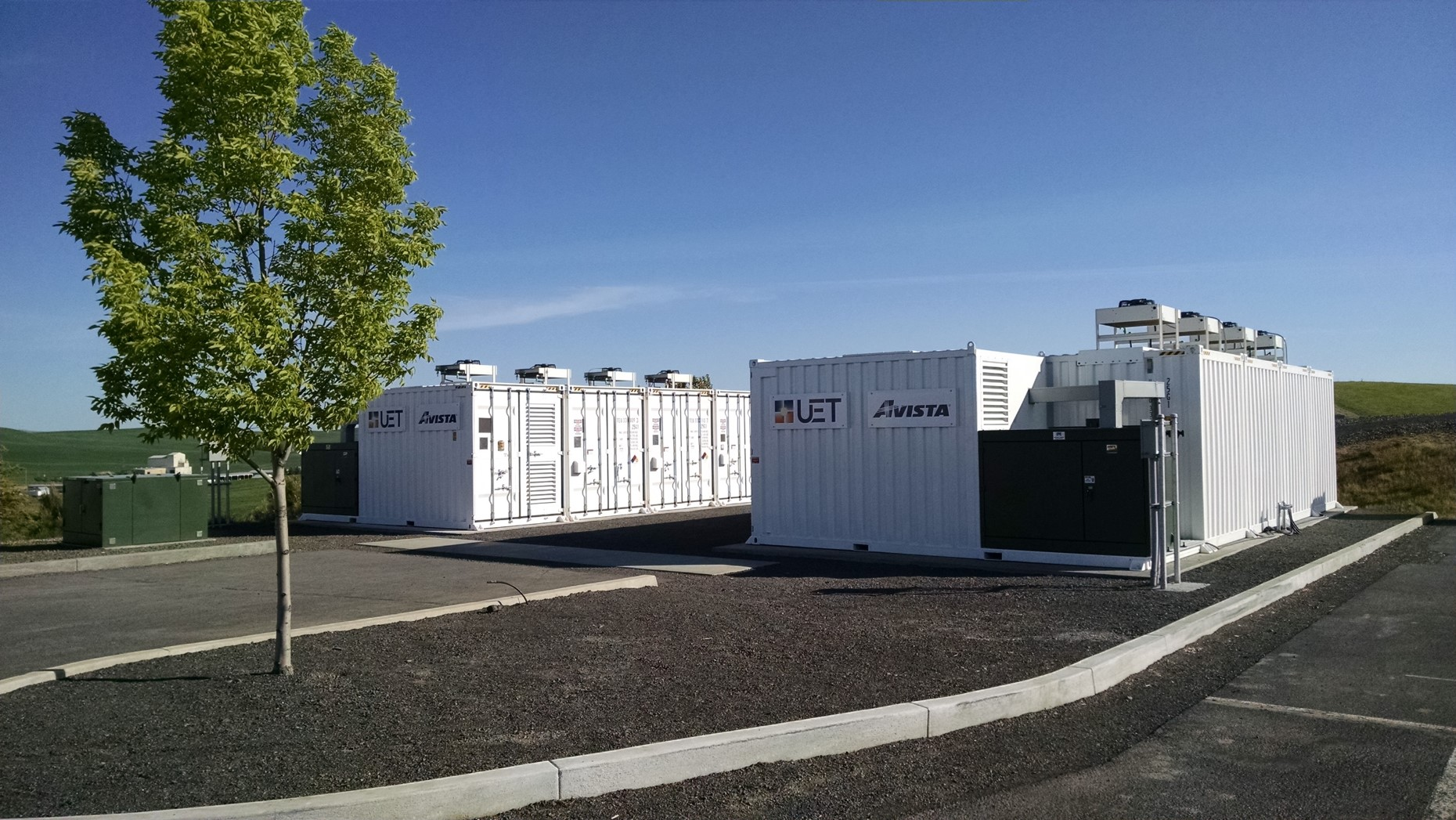
A battery storage facility

Energy storage helps overcome barriers to intermittent renewable energy and is an important aspect of a sustainable energy system. The most commonly used and available storage method is pumped-storage hydroelectricity, which requires locations with large differences in height and access to water. Batteries, especially lithium-ion batteries, are also deployed widely. Batteries typically store electricity for short periods; research is ongoing into technology with sufficient capacity to last through seasons.

Costs of utility-scale batteries in the US have fallen by around 70% since 2015, however the cost and low energy density of batteries makes them impractical for the very large energy storage needed to balance inter-seasonal variations in energy production. Pumped hydro storage and power-to-gas (converting electricity to gas and back) with capacity for multi-month usage has been implemented in some locations. According to the International Energy Agency (IEA), global battery storage capacity is expected to increase nearly 15-fold between 2021 and 2030, driven by falling costs and increased investment in clean infrastructure.

=== Electrification ===
Electrification rates of different countries compared to OECD Europe

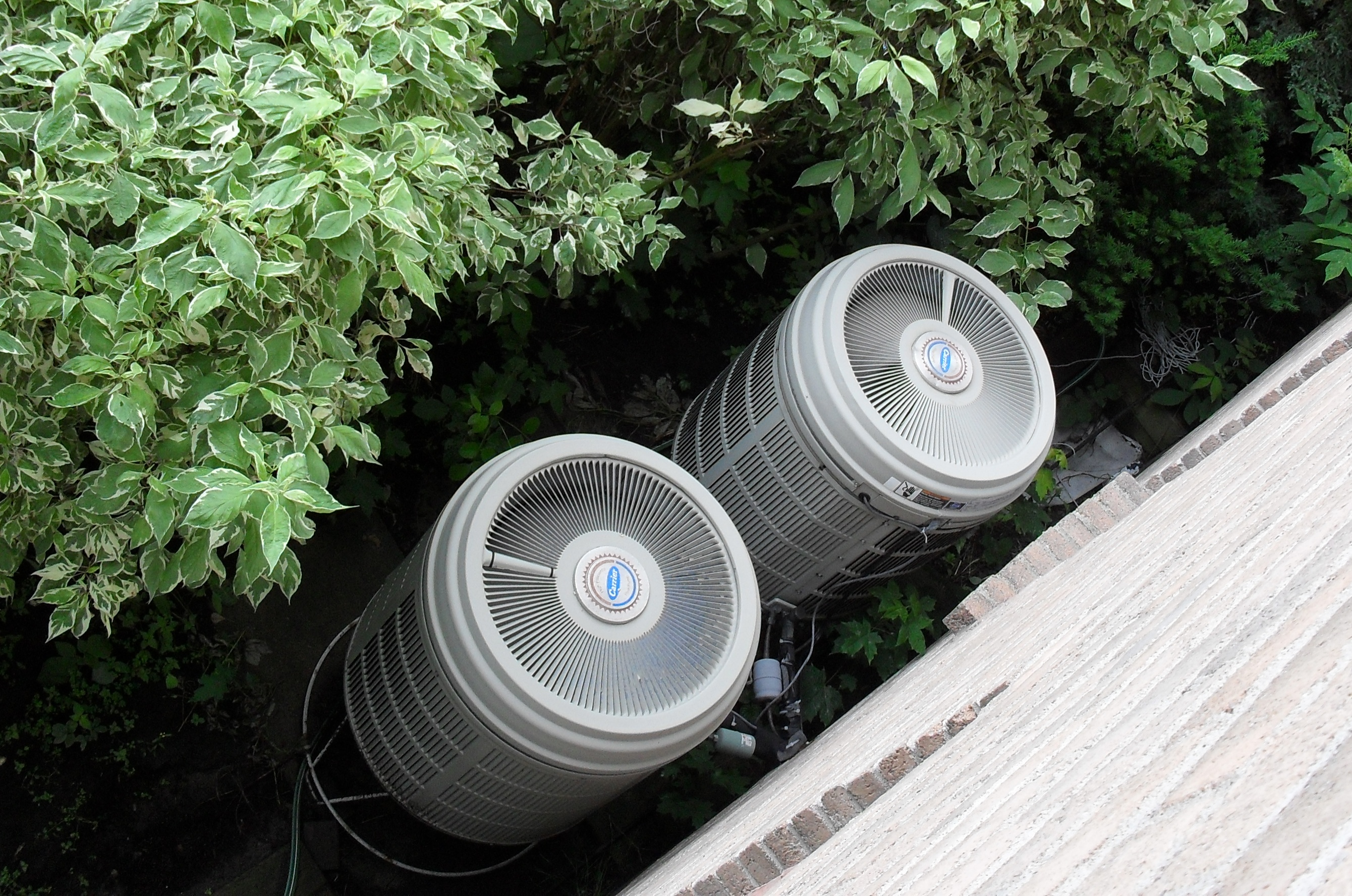
The outdoor section of a heat pump. In contrast to oil and gas boilers, they use electricity and are highly efficient. As such, electrification of heating can significantly reduce emissions.

Compared to the rest of the energy system, emissions can be reduced much faster in the electricity sector. As of 2019, 37% of global electricity is produced from low-carbon sources (renewables and nuclear energy). Fossil fuels, primarily coal, produce the rest of the electricity supply. One of the easiest and fastest ways to reduce greenhouse gas emissions is to phase out coal-fired power plants and increase renewable electricity generation.

Climate change mitigation pathways envision extensive electrification—the use of electricity as a substitute for the direct burning of fossil fuels for heating buildings and for transport. Ambitious climate policy would see a doubling of energy share consumed as electricity by 2050, from 20% in 2020.

One of the challenges in providing universal access to electricity is distributing power to rural areas. Off-grid and mini-grid systems based on renewable energy, such as small solar PV installations that generate and store enough electricity for a village, are important solutions. Wider access to reliable electricity would lead to less use of kerosene lighting and diesel generators, which are currently common in the developing world.

Infrastructure for generating and storing renewable electricity requires minerals and metals, such as cobalt and lithium for batteries and copper for solar panels. Recycling can meet some of this demand if product lifecycles are well-designed, however achieving net zero emissions would still require major increases in mining for 17 types of metals and minerals. A small group of countries or companies sometimes dominate the markets for these commodities, raising geopolitical concerns. Most of the world's cobalt, for instance, is mined in the Democratic Republic of the Congo, a politically unstable region where mining is often associated with human rights risks. More diverse geographical sourcing may ensure a more flexible and less brittle supply chain.

=== Hydrogen ===
Hydrogen gas is widely discussed as a fuel with potential to reduce greenhouse gas emissions. This requires hydrogen to be produced cleanly, in quantities to supply in sectors and applications where cheaper and more energy efficient mitigation alternatives are limited. These applications include heavy industry and long-distance transport.

Hydrogen can be deployed as an energy source in fuel cells to produce electricity, or via combustion to generate heat. When hydrogen is consumed in fuel cells, the only emission at the point of use is water vapour. Combustion of hydrogen can lead to the thermal formation of harmful nitrogen oxides. The overall lifecycle emissions of hydrogen depend on how it is produced. Nearly all of the world's current supply of hydrogen is created from fossil fuels.

The main method of producing hydrogen is steam methane reforming, in which hydrogen is produced from a chemical reaction between steam and methane, the main component of natural gas. Producing one tonne of hydrogen through this process emits 6.6–9.3 tonnes of carbon dioxide. While carbon capture and storage (CCS) could remove a large fraction of these emissions, the overall carbon footprint of hydrogen from natural gas is difficult to assess as of 2021, in part because of emissions (including vented and fugitive methane) created in the production of the natural gas itself.

Electricity can be used to split water molecules, producing sustainable hydrogen provided the electricity was generated sustainably. However, this electrolysis process is currently more expensive than creating hydrogen from methane without CCS and the efficiency of energy conversion is inherently low. Hydrogen can be produced when there is a surplus of variable renewable electricity, then stored and used to generate heat or to re-generate electricity. It can be further transformed into liquid fuels such as green ammonia and green methanol. Innovation in hydrogen electrolysers could make large-scale production of hydrogen from electricity more cost-competitive.

Hydrogen fuel can produce the intense heat required for industrial production of steel, cement, glass, and chemicals, thus contributing to the decarbonisation of industry alongside other technologies, such as electric arc furnaces for steelmaking. For steelmaking, hydrogen can function as a clean fuel and simultaneously as a low-carbon catalyst replacing coal-derived coke. Hydrogen used to decarbonise transportation is likely to find its largest applications in shipping, aviation and to a lesser extent heavy goods vehicles. For light duty vehicles including passenger cars, hydrogen is far behind other alternative fuel vehicles, especially compared with the rate of adoption of battery electric vehicles, and may not play a significant role in future.

Disadvantages of hydrogen as a fuel include high costs of storage and distribution due to hydrogen's explosivity, its large volume compared to other fuels, and its tendency to make pipes brittle.

=== Energy usage technologies ===
==== Transport ====
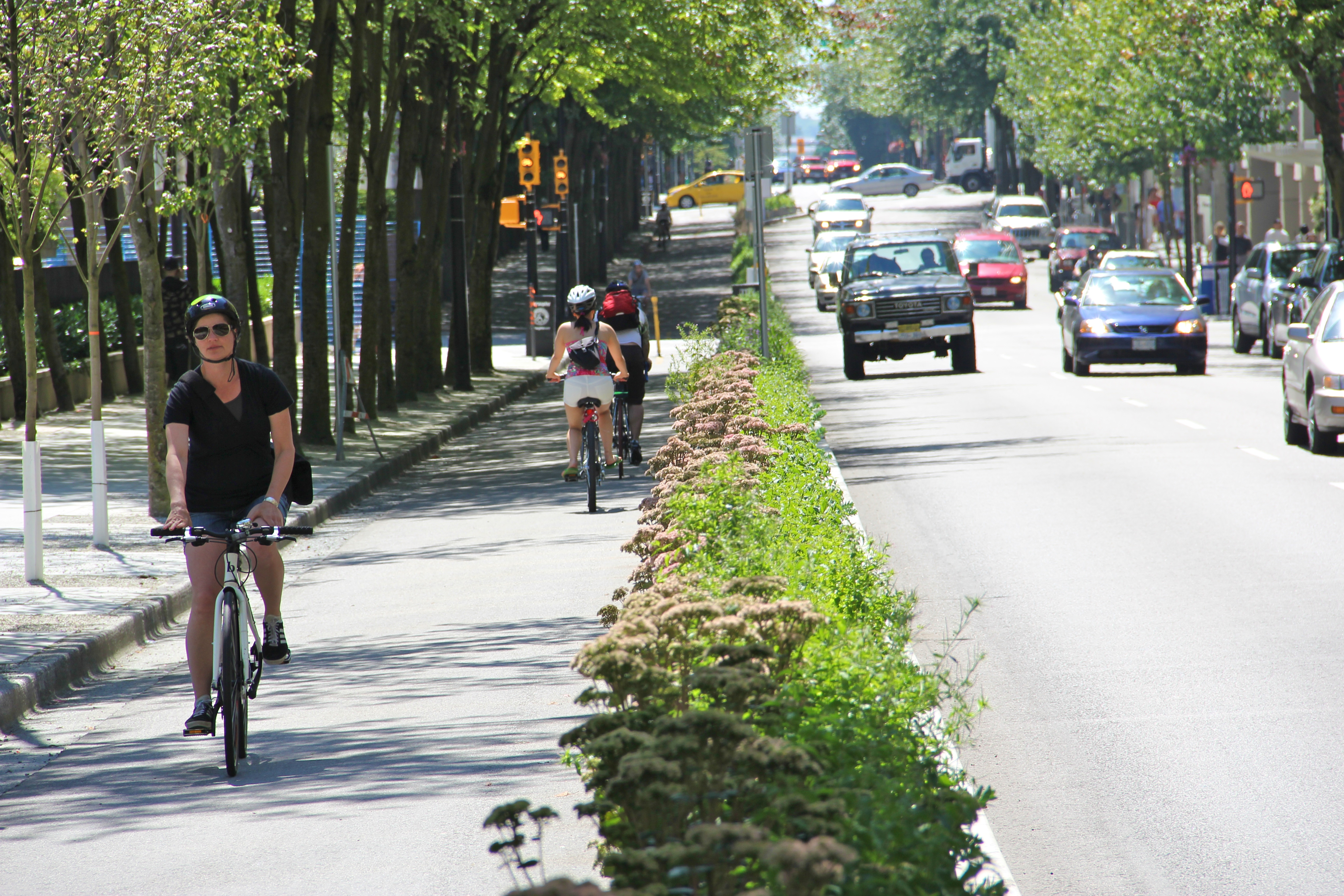
Utility cycling infrastructure, such as this bike lane in Vancouver, encourages sustainable transport.

Transport accounts for 14% of global greenhouse gas emissions, but there are multiple ways to make transport more sustainable. Public transport typically emits fewer greenhouse gases per passenger than personal vehicles, since trains and buses can carry many more passengers at once. Short-distance flights can be replaced by high-speed rail, which is more efficient, especially when electrified. Promoting non-motorised transport such as walking and cycling, particularly in cities, can make transport cleaner and healthier.

The energy efficiency of cars has increased over time, but shifting to electric vehicles is an important further step towards decarbonising transport and reducing air pollution. A large proportion of traffic-related air pollution consists of particulate matter from road dust and the wearing-down of tyres and brake pads. Substantially reducing pollution from these non-exhaust sources cannot be achieved by electrification; it requires measures such as making vehicles lighter and driving them less. Light-duty cars in particular are a prime candidate for decarbonization using battery technology. 25% of the world's CO_{2} emissions still originate from the transportation sector.

Long-distance freight transport and aviation are difficult sectors to electrify with current technologies, mostly because of the weight of batteries needed for long-distance travel, battery recharging times, and limited battery lifespans. Where available, freight transport by ship and rail is generally more sustainable than by air and by road. Hydrogen vehicles may be an option for larger vehicles such as lorries. Many of the techniques needed to lower emissions from shipping and aviation are still early in their development, with ammonia (produced from hydrogen) a promising candidate for shipping fuel. Aviation biofuel may be one of the better uses of bioenergy if emissions are captured and stored during manufacture of the fuel.

==== Buildings ====
Over one-third of energy use is in buildings and their construction. To heat buildings, alternatives to burning fossil fuels and biomass include electrification through heat pumps or electric heaters, geothermal energy, central solar heating, reuse of waste heat, and seasonal thermal energy storage. Heat pumps provide both heat and air conditioning through a single appliance. The IEA estimates heat pumps could provide over 90% of space and water heating requirements globally.

A highly efficient way to heat buildings is through district heating, in which heat is generated in a centralized location and then distributed to multiple buildings through insulated pipes. Traditionally, most district heating systems have used fossil fuels, but modern and cold district heating systems are designed to use high shares of renewable energy.

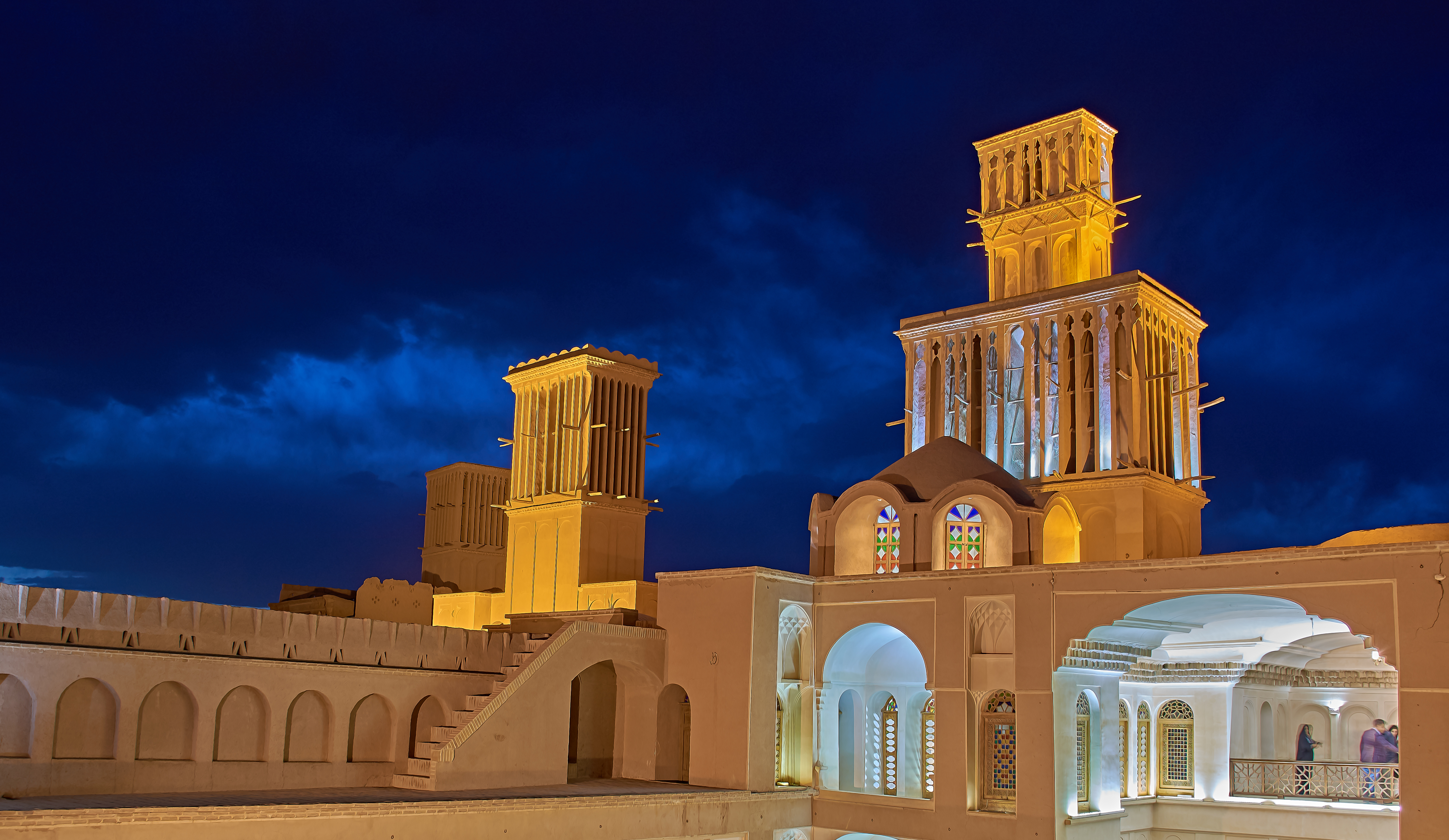
Passive cooling features, such as these windcatcher towers in Iran, bring cool air into buildings without any use of energy.

Cooling of buildings can be made more efficient through passive building design, planning that minimizes the urban heat island effect, and district cooling systems that cool multiple buildings with piped cold water. Air conditioning requires large amounts of electricity and is not always affordable for poorer households. Some air conditioning units still use refrigerants that are greenhouse gases, as some countries have not ratified the Kigali Amendment to only use climate-friendly refrigerants.

==== Cooking ====
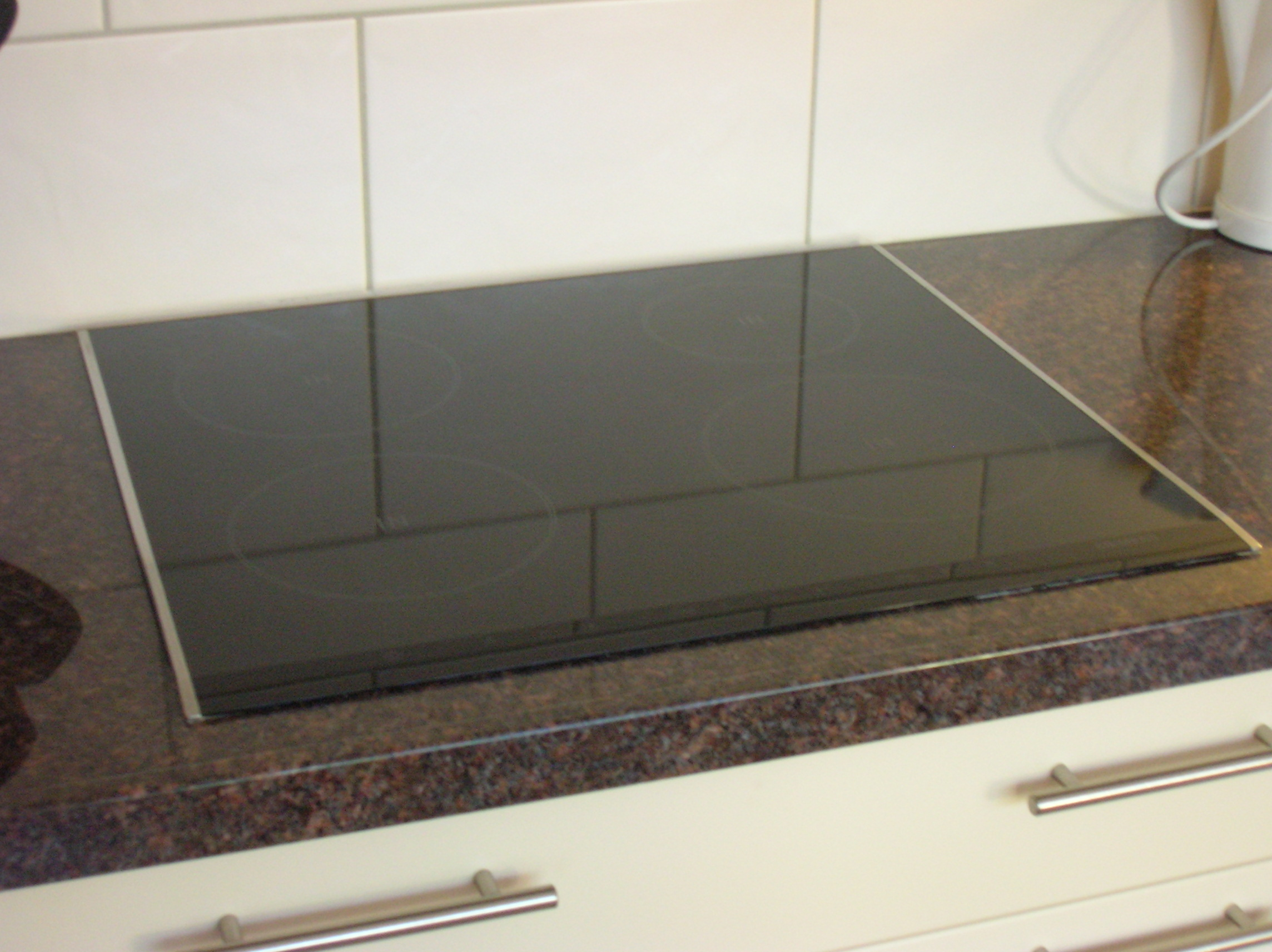
For cooking, electric induction stoves are one of the most energy-efficient and safest options.

In developing countries where populations suffer from energy poverty, polluting fuels such as wood or animal dung are often used for cooking. Cooking with these fuels is generally unsustainable, because they release harmful smoke and because harvesting wood can lead to forest degradation. The universal adoption of clean cooking facilities, which are already ubiquitous in rich countries, would dramatically improve health and have minimal negative effects on climate. Clean cooking facilities, e.g. cooking facilities that produce less indoor soot, typically use natural gas, liquefied petroleum gas (both of which consume oxygen and produce carbon-dioxide) or electricity as the energy source; biogas systems are a promising alternative in some contexts. Improved cookstoves that burn biomass more efficiently than traditional stoves are an interim solution where transitioning to clean cooking systems is difficult.

==== Industry ====
Over one-third of energy use is by industry. Most of that energy is deployed in thermal processes: generating heat, drying, and refrigeration. The share of renewable energy in industry was 14.5% in 2017—mostly low-temperature heat supplied by bioenergy and electricity. The most energy-intensive activities in industry have the lowest shares of renewable energy, as they face limitations in generating heat at temperatures over 200 °C (390 °F).

For some industrial processes, commercialisation of technologies that have not yet been built or operated at full scale will be needed to eliminate greenhouse gas emissions. Steelmaking, for instance, is difficult to electrify because it traditionally uses coke, which is derived from coal, both to create very high-temperature heat and as an ingredient in the steel itself. The production of plastic, cement, and fertilisers also requires significant amounts of energy, with limited possibilities available to decarbonise. A switch to a circular economy would make industry more sustainable as it involves recycling more and thereby using less energy compared to investing energy to mine and refine new raw materials.

== Government policies ==
"Bringing new energy technologies to market can often take several decades, but the imperative of reaching net‐zero emissions globally by 2050 means that progress has to be much faster. Experience has shown that the role of government is crucial in shortening the time needed to bring new technology to market and to diffuse it widely."

— International Energy Agency (2021)

Well-designed government policies that promote energy system transformation can lower greenhouse gas emissions and improve air quality simultaneously, and in many cases can also increase energy security and lessen the financial burden of using energy.

=== Regulations ===
Environmental regulations have been used since the 1970s to promote more sustainable use of energy. Some governments have committed to dates for phasing out coal-fired power plants and ending new fossil fuel exploration. Governments can require that new cars produce zero emissions, or new buildings are heated by electricity instead of gas. Renewable portfolio standards in several countries require utilities to increase the percentage of electricity they generate from renewable sources.

Governments can accelerate energy system transformation by leading the development of infrastructure such as long-distance electrical transmission lines, smart grids, and hydrogen pipelines. In transport, appropriate infrastructure and incentives can make travel more efficient and less car-dependent. Urban planning that discourages sprawl can reduce energy use in local transport and buildings while enhancing quality of life. Government-funded research, procurement, and incentive policies have historically been critical to the development and maturation of clean energy technologies, such as solar and lithium batteries. In the IEA's scenario for a net zero-emission energy system by 2050, public funding is rapidly mobilised to bring a range of newer technologies to the demonstration phase and to encourage deployment.

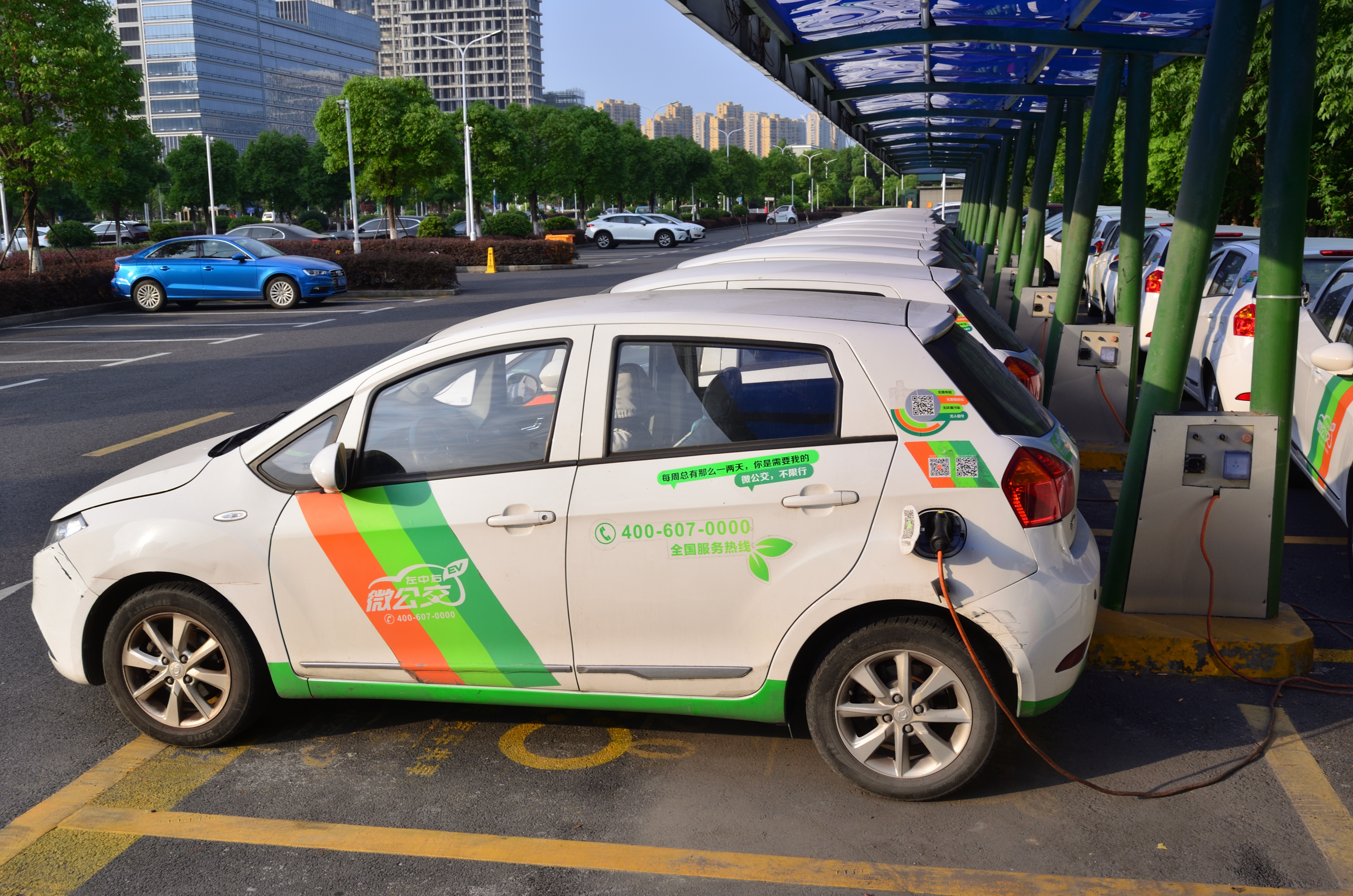
Several countries and the European Union have committed to dates for all new cars to be zero-emissions vehicles.

=== Carbon pricing ===
Carbon pricing (such as a tax on CO_{2} emissions) gives industries and consumers an incentive to reduce emissions while letting them choose how to do so. For example, they can shift to low-emission energy sources, improve energy efficiency, or reduce their use of energy-intensive products and services. Carbon pricing has encountered strong political pushback in some jurisdictions, whereas energy-specific policies tend to be politically safer. Most studies indicate that to limit global warming to 1.5 °C, carbon pricing would need to be complemented by stringent energy-specific policies.

As of 2019, the price of carbon in most regions is too low to achieve the goals of the Paris Agreement. Carbon taxes provide a source of revenue that can be used to lower other taxes or help lower-income households afford higher energy costs. Some governments, such as the EU and the UK, are exploring the use of carbon border adjustments. These place tariffs on imports from countries with less stringent climate policies, to ensure that industries subject to internal carbon prices remain competitive.

=== Pace ===
The scale and pace of policy reforms that have been initiated as of 2020 are far less than needed to fulfil the climate goals of the Paris Agreement. In addition to domestic policies, greater international cooperation is required to accelerate innovation and to assist poorer countries in establishing a sustainable path to full energy access.

Countries may support renewables to create jobs. The International Labour Organization estimates that efforts to limit global warming to 2 °C would result in net job creation in most sectors of the economy. It predicts that 24 million new jobs would be created by 2030 in areas such as renewable electricity generation, improving energy-efficiency in buildings, and the transition to electric vehicles. Six million jobs would be lost, in sectors such as mining and fossil fuels. Governments can make the transition to sustainable energy more politically and socially feasible by ensuring a just transition for workers and regions that depend on the fossil fuel industry, to ensure they have alternative economic opportunities.

== Finance ==
Electrified transport and renewable energy are key areas of investment for the renewable energy transition.

China's count of multi-country patent filings has surged since the mid-2010s, leading in batteries and solar, though Europe still dominates in wind energy and smart grids. China also leads in highly cited publications in global peer-reviewed journals.

Raising enough money for innovation and investment is a prerequisite for the energy transition. The IPCC estimates that to limit global warming to 1.5 °C, US$2.4 trillion would need to be invested in the energy system each year between 2016 and 2035. Most studies project that these costs, equivalent to 2.5% of world GDP, would be small compared to the economic and health benefits. Average annual investment in low-carbon energy technologies and energy efficiency would need to be six times more by 2050 compared to 2015. Underfunding is particularly acute in the least developed countries, which are not attractive to the private sector.

The United Nations Framework Convention on Climate Change estimates that climate financing totalled $681 billion in 2016. Most of this is private-sector investment in renewable energy deployment, public-sector investment in sustainable transport, and private-sector investment in energy efficiency. The Paris Agreement includes a pledge of an extra $100 billion per year from developed countries to poor countries, to do climate change mitigation and adaptation. This goal has not been met and measurement of progress has been hampered by unclear accounting rules. If energy-intensive businesses like chemicals, fertilizers, ceramics, steel, and non-ferrous metals invest significantly in R&D, its usage in industry might amount to between 5% and 20% of all energy used.

Fossil fuel funding and subsidies are a significant barrier to the energy transition. Direct global fossil fuel subsidies were $319 billion in 2017. This rises to $5.2 trillion when indirect costs are priced in, like the effects of air pollution. Ending these could lead to a 28% reduction in global carbon emissions and a 46% reduction in air pollution deaths. Funding for clean energy has been largely unaffected by the COVID-19 pandemic, and pandemic-related economic stimulus packages offer possibilities for a green recovery.
