= Steve Davis (scientist) =

American scientist

Steven J. Davis
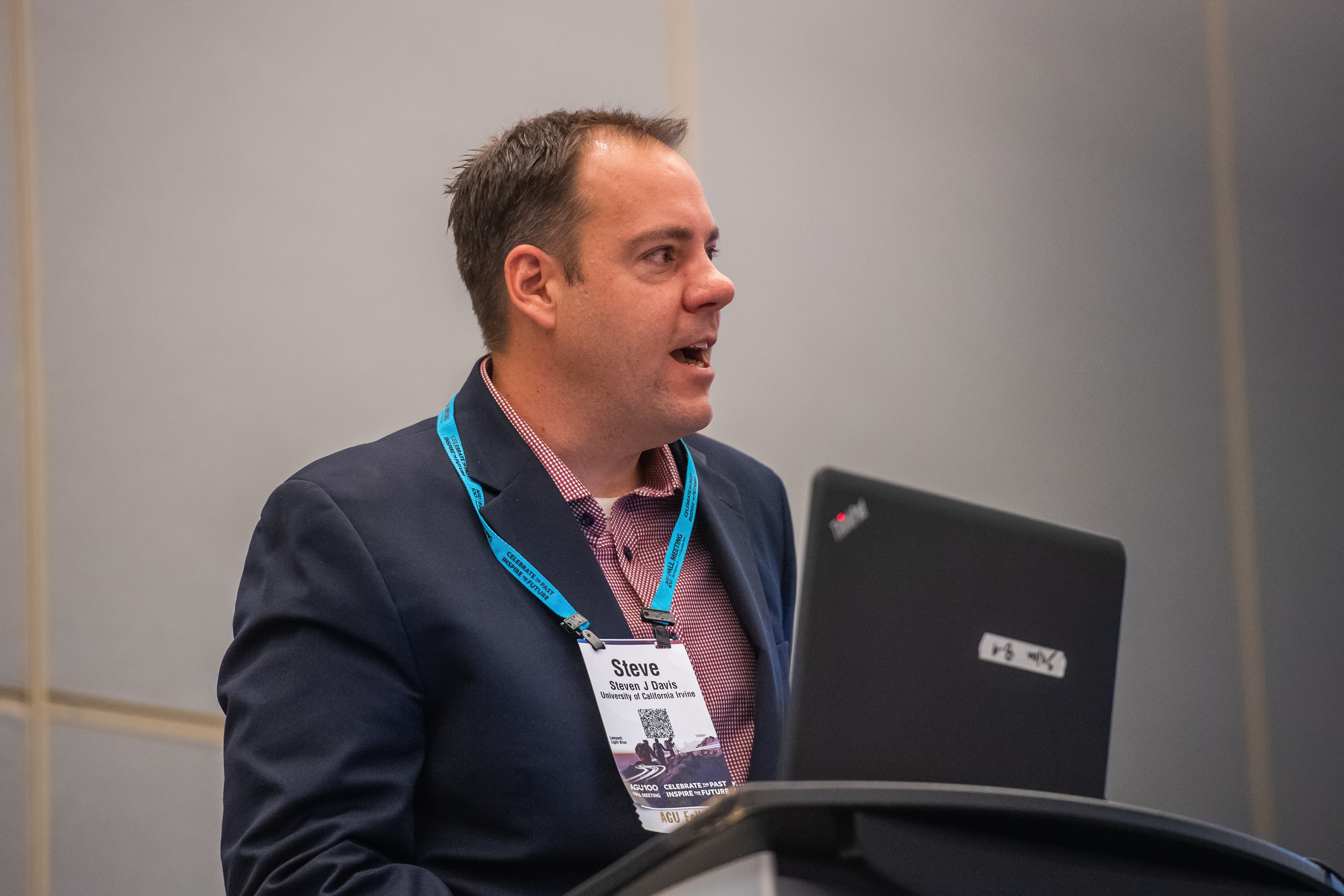
- Steven J. Davis at 2019 AGU Fall Meeting
- Born: Florida

Academic background
- Education: University of Florida; University of Virginia; Stanford University

Academic work
- Discipline: Earth System Science
- Institutions: Stanford University

Steven J. Davis is an American earth system scientist in the Department of Earth System Science of the Stanford Doerr School of Sustainability at Stanford University, where he leads the Sustainable Solutions Lab. His research examines the interactions between energy systems, climate change, agriculture, and global trade.

== Education and legal career ==
Davis received his undergraduate education at the University of Florida in Gainesville, Florida, earned a Juris Doctor from the University of Virginia School of Law, and completed his PhD in Geological and Environmental Sciences at Stanford University in 2008.

From 2001 to 2004, he worked as a corporate lawyer at Gray, Cary, Ware & Freidenrich LLP in Palo Alto, California (now part of DLA Piper), advising venture-backed technology startups in Silicon Valley.

Following his doctoral studies, Davis worked as a postdoctoral scholar in the Department of Global Ecology at the Carnegie Institution for Science from 2008 to 2012, working with Ken Caldeira. He subsequently held faculty appointments at the University of California, Irvine, where he served as Assistant Professor (2012–2016), Associate Professor (2016–2020), and Professor of Earth System Science (2020–2024), with an affiliated appointment in Civil and Environmental Engineering. He joined Stanford University in 2024 as a professor in the Department of Earth System Science.

== Research ==
Davis researches embedded emissions of carbon dioxide and air pollution in international trade, energy systems, carbon lock-in, the quantities and causes of greenhouse gas emissions, and the interactions of agriculture and the global carbon cycle.

His research has examined how energy systems, international trade, and consumption patterns influence global greenhouse gas emissions. His research output has been widely cited, and he has been recognized by Clarivate Analytics as a Highly Cited Researcher since 2019, a designation identifying researchers whose publications rank in the top 1% by citations for their field and publication year based on Web of Science data.

Daviss' research has been widely featured in major international media outlets, reflecting its relevance to public and policy debates on climate change, energy systems, and global trade. His work has been covered by publications such as The New York Times, The Economist, The Financial Times, The Wall Street Journal, Bloomberg, Reuters, National Geographic, and MIT Technology Review. Media coverage of his research has addressed a broad range of topics, including emissions embedded in international trade, carbon lock-in in energy infrastructure, climate impacts of agriculture and food systems, aviation and industrial decarbonization, wildfire and forest carbon dynamics, and the distributional consequences of climate policy. Through this coverage, his research has contributed to public understanding of how consumption, energy use, and policy choices shape global greenhouse gas emissions.

His research has also been communicated through accessible and unconventional examples, including analyses of beer and food systems, which have been featured in popular science media and referenced in broader public discourse.

== Awards ==
In 2015, Davis and his co-authors were awarded the Cozzarelli Prize by the Proceedings of the National Academy of Sciences for a paper they published on the role of China's international trade and air pollution in the United States. In 2018, Davis received the James B. Macelwane Medal of the American Geophysical Union (AGU) for his contributions in developing a science that links global climate change and society, and was simultaneously elected an AGU Fellow.

== Policy engagement and applied climate work ==
Davis has played an active role in applying earth system and climate science to policy, standards, and institutional decision-making. He co-founded two non-profit organizations focused on climate mitigation: the Climate Conservancy, which helped pioneer product-level carbon accounting, and Near Zero, an organization dedicated to producing credible, impartial, and actionable assessments to support efforts to reduce greenhouse gas emissions to near zero.

He has contributed to major international and national climate assessments, serving as a contributing author to the mitigation chapter of the Intergovernmental Panel on Climate Change Sixth Assessment Report and as a chapter lead author for the Mitigation chapter in the Fifth U.S. National Climate Assessment, published in 2023. Through this work, he helped synthesize scientific evidence used by governments and institutions to inform climate mitigation strategies and policy frameworks.

Davis has also engaged with organizations translating climate science into practice. He served as Head of Climate Science at Watershed, where he helped translate advances in greenhouse gas accounting and mitigation science into tools used by companies to measure emissions, assess supply-chain impacts, and set science-based decarbonization targets. Since 2013, he also serves on the Technical Council of the Science Based Targets initiative, contributing scientific expertise to the development of standards that align corporate emissions-reduction targets with climate science. Through these roles, Davis has contributed to the application of climate science in regulatory reporting, corporate sustainability strategies, and emissions-reduction planning.

== Selected publications by topic ==
=== Energy ===
- Davis, Steven J. et al (2018). "Net-zero emissions energy systems", Science, 360. 1419.
- Davis, Steven J. and Socolow, Robert. (2014). "Commitment accounting of CO2 emissions", Environmental Research Letters, 9. 084018.
- Davis, Steven J., Matthews, D. and Caldeira, Ken. (2010). "Future CO2 emissions and climate change from existing energy infrastructure", Science, 329. 1330-1335.
- Bergero, Candelaria et al. (2023). "Pathways to net-zero emissions aviation", Nature Sustainability, 6. 404-414.
- Tong, Dan et al. (2019). "Committed emissions from existing energy infrastructure jeopardize 1.5C climate target", Nature, 572. 373-377.

=== Trade ===
- Davis, Steven J. and Caldeira, Ken. (2010). "Consumption-based accounting of CO2 emissions", Proceedings of the National Academy of Sciences, 107 (12). 5687-5693.
- Hong, Chaopeng et al. (2022). "Land-use emissions embodied in international trade", Science, 376. 597-603.
- Meng, Jing et al. (2018). "The rise of South-South trade and its effect on global CO2 emissions", Nature Communications, 9. 1871.
- Zhang, Qiang et al. (2017). "Transboundary health impacts of transported global air pollution and international trade", Nature, 543. 705-709.
- Lin, Jintai et al. (2014). "China's international trade and air pollution in the United States", Proceedings of the National Academy of Sciences, 111 (5). 1736-1741.
- Davis, Steven J., Peters, Glen P. and Caldeira, Ken. (2011). "The supply chain of CO2 emissions", Proceedings of the National Academy of Sciences, 108 (45). 18554-18559.
- Guan, Dabo et al. (2020). "Global supply chain efforts of COVID-19 control methods", Nature Human Behaviour, 4. 577-587.

=== Food, water, and land use ===
- Burney, Jennifer, Davis, Steven J. and Lobell, David. (2010). "Greenhouse gas mitigation by agricultural intensification", Proceedings of the National Academy of Sciences, 107 (26). 12052-12057.
- Hong, Chaopeng et al. (2021). "Global and regional drivers of land-use emissions in 1961–2017", Nature, 589. 554-561.
- Davis, Steven J. et al. (2023). "Food without agriculture", Nature Sustainability, 7. 90-95.
- Qin, Yue et al. (2019). "Flexibility and intensity of global water use", Nature Sustainability, 2, 515-523.
- Hong, Chaopeng et al. (2020). "Impacts of ozone and climate change on yields of perennial crops in California", Nature Food, 1. 166-172.

=== Carbon management ===
- Smith, Pete et al. (2015). "Biophysical and economic limits to negative CO2 emissions", Nature Climate Change, 6. 42-50.
- DeAngelo, Julianne et al. (2022). "Economic and biophysical limits to seaweed farming for climate change mitigation", Nature Plants, 9. 45-57.
- Roijen, Elizabeth et al. (2025). "Building materials could store more than 16 billion tonnes of CO2 annually", Science, 387. 176-182.
- Xi, Fengming et al. (2016). "Substantial global carbon uptake by cement carbonation", Nature Geoscience, 9. 880-883.

=== Impacts and adaptation ===
- Sanders, Brett et al. (2023) "Large and inequitable flood risks in Los Angeles, California", Nature Sustainability, 6. 47-57.
- Wang, Daoping et al. (2020) "Economic footprint of California wildfires in 2018", Nature Sustainability, 4. 252-260.
- Sloat, Lindsey et al. (2020) "Climate adaptation by crop migration", Nature Communications, 11. 1243.
- Qin, Yue et al. (2020) "Agricultural risks of changing snowmelt", Nature Climate Change, 10. 459-465.
- Xie, Wei et al. (2018) "Decreases in global beer supply due to extreme drought and heat", Nature Plants, 4. 964-973.
- Mazdiyasni, Omid et al. (2017) "Increasing probability of mortality during Indian heat waves", Science Advances, 3. e1700066.
