= U.S. Climate Change Technology Program =

United States Climate Change Technology Program
- Logo of the CCTP

Agency overview
- Formed: 2002
- (etc.)
- Jurisdiction: Federal government of the United States
- Headquarters: 1000 Independence Avenue, S.W., U.S. Department of Energy, Washington, D.C., DC 20585, 202-586-0070
- Minister responsible: (etc.)
- Agency executive: (etc.)
- Child agencies: (etc.)
- Website: www.climatechange.gov

The United States Climate Change Technology Program or CCTP is a multi-agency planning and coordination entity. Its purpose is to accelerate the development and deployment of technologies that can reduce, avoid, or capture and store greenhouse gas emissions. CCTP was established administratively in 2002, authorized by the Energy Policy Act of 2005, and appropriated funds in 2007. Currently, the Department of Energy is designated as the lead agency.

== Participating agencies ==
The following is a list of participating agencies.

- Department of Agriculture
- Department of Commerce (DOC)
  - National Institute of Standards and Technology (NIST)
  - International Trade Administration (ITA)
  - National Oceanic and Atmospheric Administration (NOAA)
- Department of Defense
- Department of Energy
- Department of Health and Human Services (HHS)
  - National Institutes of Health (NIH)
- Department of the Interior
- Department of State (DOS)
  - U.S. Agency for International Development (USAID)
- Department of Transportation
- Environmental Protection Agency
- National Aeronautics and Space Administration
- National Science Foundation

== See also ==
- Clear Skies Initiative
- Committee on Climate Change Science and Technology Integration
- Energy Policy Act of 2005
