= Claire Adida =

French political scientist

- Occupation: Political scientist
- Known for: Research on ethnic politics and immigration
- Title: Professor of Political Science

Academic background
- Education: Stanford University (PhD)

Academic work
- Discipline: Political science
- Institutions: University of California, San Diego
- Notable works: Why Muslim Integration Fails in Christian-Heritage Societies (2016)

Claire Adida is Professor of Political Science at the University of California, San Diego. She is also a faculty affiliate at the Policy Design and Evaluation Lab, the Center for Comparative Immigration Studies, the Stanford Immigration Policy Lab, and the Evidence in Governance and Politics Group. She is on the editorial board of the American Political Science Review. She is known for research on comparative ethnic policies focusing on identity, immigration and integration, inter-group cooperation and conflict, as well as the use of survey experiments.

== Education and career ==
Adida has a PhD in political science from Stanford University. Her research projects have covered how voters in West Africa hold politicians accountable; the experience of Somalis who immigrate to the United States, how to increase inclusionary attitudes towards Syrian refugees, among other topics.

== Personal life ==
Her partner is Jennifer Burney, Associate Professor and the Marshall Saunders Chancellor's Endowed Chair in Global Climate Policy and Research at the University of California, San Diego. They have two children.
