= Carbon lock-in =

Carbon lock-in refers to the self-perpetuating inertia created by large fossil fuel-based energy systems that inhibits public and private efforts to introduce alternative energy technologies. Related to the concept of technological lock-in, the concept is most used in relation to the challenge of altering the current energy infrastructure to respond to global climate change.

The concept and term was coined by Gregory C. Unruh in a 1999 Fletcher School, Tufts University doctoral thesis entitled "Escaping Carbon Lock-In." It has since gained popularity in climate change policy discussions, especially those focused on preventing the globalization of carbon lock-in to rapidly industrializing countries like China and India.

The source of carbon lock-in inertia in energy systems arises from the co-evolution of large interdependent technological networks and the social institutions and cultural practices that support and benefit from system growth. The growth of the system is fostered by increasing returns to scale.

== Introduction ==
According to Unruh:

…industrial economies have been locked into fossil fuel-based energy systems through a process of technological and institutional co-evolution driven by path-dependent increasing returns to scale. It is asserted that this condition, termed carbon lock-in, creates persistent market and policy failures that can inhibit the diffusion of carbon-saving technologies despite their apparent environmental and economic advantages.

— Gregory C. Unruh, Understanding carbon lock-in (2000)

The concept emerged in response to what is termed the "climate policy paradox," which recognizes that there is substantial scientific consensus that climate change is a real and present threat to humans and other species uniquely adapted to current climatic conditions. Similarly there is evidence that technologies exist which can lower the carbon intensity of economic activity in a cost-effective manner, including energy efficiency innovations as well as some renewable energy applications. The existence of these apparent "win-win" no-regrets opportunities for society to act on climate concerns creates a paradox. If such technologies exist, and they are cost effective and help minimize climate-forcing emissions, why aren't they diffusing more rapidly? The conjecture is that industrial economies have become locked into fossil fuel technologies by past investments and policy decisions, the effects of positive feedback on increasing returns, and the economic growth of energy infrastructure.

== A Co-Evolutionary Process ==
Carbon lock-in emerges over time as energy and economic development in industrialized countries has proceeded. The carbon lock-in framework builds hierarchically from individual technological artifacts, usually manufactured by for-profit organizations, to technological systems of interdependent artifacts. As these systems grow, they begin to have important societal implications drawing in government regulation of the system's growth and development. The government's involvement with system management, be it for safety, universal service or other national interests, institutionalizes the system and signals the emergence of a techno-institutional complex.

Over time consumers and the public adapt their lifestyles to the capabilities of the technology and the system becomes embedded in society. Examples of this process can be seen in the growth of automobile-based transportation systems and fossil-fuel powered energy systems.

It is this co-evolutionary positive feedback development process that creates the lock-in condition and associated barriers to the diffusion of alternative technologies, even those with known superior environmental performance characteristics. A 2007 Oak Ridge National Laboratory report entitled "Carbon Lock-In: Barriers to Deploying Climate Change Mitigation Technologies" (sponsored by the U.S. Climate Change Technology Program, CCTP) classifies three major types of carbon lock-in barriers: cost effectiveness, financial/legal and intellectual property barriers. Escaping the lock-in condition requires overcoming these barriers.

== Globalizing Carbon Lock-In ==
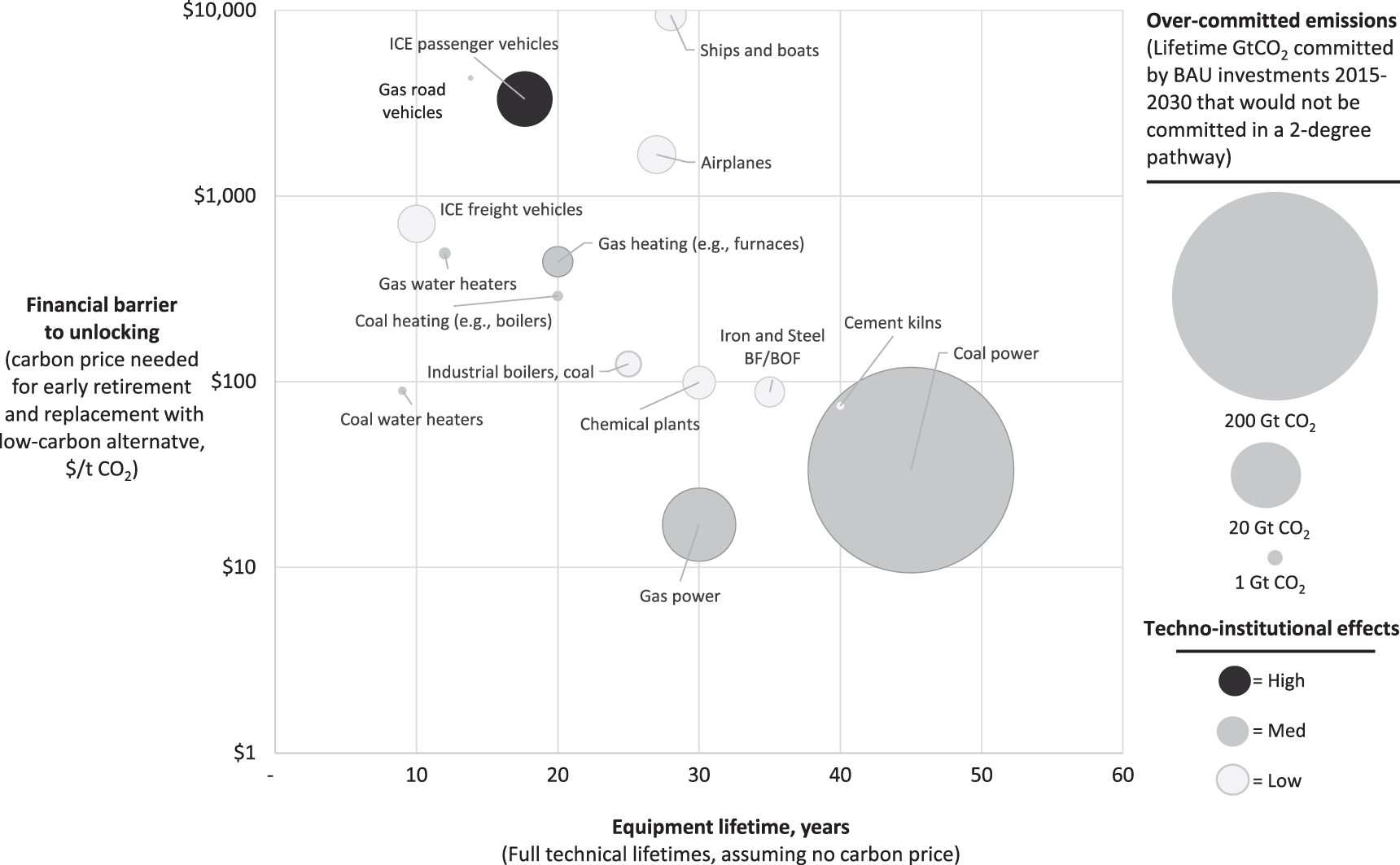
According to an assessment proposed by Erickson et al. (2015), coal power plants, because of long lifetime, gas power, which may soon be overbuilt, and vehicles with internal combustion engines, because of strong techno-institutional effects, over-commit the highest amounts of carbon.

The carbon lock-in concept has gained more attention as China's rapid industrial economic development has progressed. The concern is that if China pursues the same fossil-fuel driven economic development models of established industrial counties, building out extensive automobile-based infrastructures and fossil-fuel powered energy systems, they will lock-in persistent and growing greenhouse gas emissions well into the future. The same arguments can be extended to all rapidly industrializing countries including India. This concern is arising as scientific evidence is indicating that current emission growth must be stopped and global emissions reduced by upwards of 60% if humanity is to prevent substantial unwanted climate disruption.

Recent studies by Steven J. Davis and co-authors have quantified the future CO_{2} emissions that can be expected to be produced by current energy infrastructure and the magnitude of lock-in related to power plants being built each year in China and elsewhere.

== See also ==
- Path dependence

== Notes and references ==
General references

- Unruh, Gregory C. (October 2000). "Understanding carbon lock-in". Energy Policy. 28 (12): 817–830. doi:10.1016/S0301-4215(00)00070-7.
- Unruh, Gregory C. (March 2002). "Escaping carbon lock-in". Energy Policy. 30 (4): 317–325. doi:10.1016/S0301-4215(01)00098-2.
- Unruh, Gregory C.; Carrillo-Hermosilla, Javier (July 2006). "Globalizing carbon lock-in". Energy Policy. 34 (10): 1185–1197. doi:10.1016/j.enpol.2004.10.013.
- Maréchal, Kevin; Lazaric, Nathalie (2010). "Overcoming inertia: insights from evolutionary economics into improved energy and climate policies". Climate Policy. 10 (1): 103–119. doi:10.3763/cpol.2008.0601. S2CID 14035332.
- Maréchal, Kevin (March 2010). "Not irrational but habitual: The importance of "behavioural lock-in" in energy consumption". Ecological Economics. 69 (5): 1104–1114. doi:10.1016/j.ecolecon.2009.12.004.
