= Jennifer Burney =

Environmental scientist

Jennifer Burney is a physicist and environmental scientist whose research focuses on food security and the environment.

== Early life and education ==
Burney grew up in Albuquerque, New Mexico. She studied history and science at Harvard University and earned a PhD in physics from Stanford, developing a superconducting camera to capture images of cosmic bodies, like pulsars or exoplanets. After graduating, she worked for Solar Electric Light Fund on rural electrification, particularly in West Africa. Starting in 2008, she worked as a postdoc at Stanford on food security and the environment. She was named a National Geographic Emerging Explorer in 2011. She also began her teaching career at University of California, San Diego in 2011 with a science policy-focused tenure track position.

== Research and career ==
As a research affiliate at the University of California, San Diego's Policy Design and Evaluation Laboratory, her research focuses mainly on global food security, adaptation, and climate change mitigation. Some projects she has worked on include rural electrification, aerosol emissions, and high-yield farming. In addition, Burney has worked towards researching agricultural shifts caused by drastic weather patterns and their associated impact on school meal programs. Burney and her team work towards analyzing data related to climate change and its effect on school food programs to improve their effectiveness.

She is professor and the Marshall Saunders Chancellor's Endowed Chair in Global Climate Policy and Research at the University of California, San Diego, as part of the School of Global Policy and Strategy.Burney also serves as deputy director of Stanford's Center on Food Security and the Environment.

Burney is a member of the American Geophysical Union.

== Personal life ==
Her partner is Claire Adida, professor of political science at the University of California, San Diego. They have two children.
