= Committee on Climate Change Science and Technology Integration =

US Climate Change research organization

The Committee on Climate Change Science and Technology Integration was created as part of the Clear Skies Initiative in February 2002 by George W. Bush, as a Cabinet-level effort to coordinate climate change science and technology research.

The White House says:

"The Secretary of Commerce and Secretary of Energy will lead the effort, in close coordination with the President's Science Advisor. The research effort will continue to be coordinated through the National Science and Technology Council in accordance with the Global Change Research Act of 1990."
