= List of nuclear waste storage facilities in Canada =

Canadian nuclear waste storage sites

Nuclear waste is stored in Canada at the following locations:

Site	Location(s)	Licensee	Class(es) of waste	Status
Best Theratronics Manufacturing Facility	Kanata, Ontario	Best Theratronics	Intermediate-level radioactive waste, low-level radioactive waste	Operating
Blind River Refinery	Blind River, Ontario	Cameco	Low-level radioactive waste	Operating
Bruce Nuclear Generating Station	Tiverton, Ontario	Bruce Power	High-level radioactive waste (wet storage), non-used nuclear fuel	Operating
BWX Technologies Fuel Manufacturing	Peterborough, Ontario Toronto, Ontario	BWX Technologies Nuclear Energy Canada	Low-level radioactive waste	Operating
Cameco Fuel Manufacturing Facility	Port Hope, Ontario	Cameco	Low-level radioactive waste	Operating
Chalk River Laboratories	Chalk River, Ontario	CNL	High-level radioactive waste (dry storage), intermediate-level radioactive waste, low-level radioactive waste	Operating/storage with surveillance
Darlington Nuclear Generating Station	Clarington, Ontario	OPG	High-level radioactive waste (wet storage)	Operating
Darlington Waste Management Facility	Clarington, Ontario	OPG	High-level radioactive waste (dry storage), intermediate-level radioactive waste	Operating
Douglas Point Waste Management Facility	Tiverton, Ontario	CNL	High-level radioactive waste (dry storage), intermediate-level radioactive waste, low-level radioactive waste	Storage with surveillance
Gentilly-1 Waste Management Facility	Gentilly, Quebec	CNL	High-level radioactive waste (dry storage), low-level radioactive waste	Storage with surveillance
Gentilly-2 Nuclear Generating Station	Gentilly, Quebec	HQ	High-level radioactive waste (wet storage), intermediate-level radioactive waste, low-level radioactive waste	Storage with surveillance
Gentilly-2 Waste Management Facility	Gentilly, Quebec	HQ	High-level radioactive waste (dry storage)	Operating
Greater Toronto Area	Greater Toronto Area, Ontario	AECL/Regional Municipality of Peel, Ontario	Low-level radioactive waste from past practices	Operating
McMaster Nuclear Research Reactor	Hamilton, Ontario	McMaster University	High-level radioactive waste (wet storage)	Operating
National Research Universal	Chalk River, Ontario	CNL	High-level radioactive waste (wet storage)	Storage with surveillance
Nordion Manufacturing Facility	Kanata, Ontario	Nordion	Intermediate-level radioactive waste	Operating
Nuclear Power Demonstration	Renfrew County, Ontario	CNL	Intermediate-level radioactive waste, low-level radioactive waste	Storage with surveillance
Pickering Nuclear Generating Station	Pickering, Ontario	OPG	High-level radioactive waste (wet storage)	Operating
Pickering Waste Management Facility	Pickering, Ontario	OPG	High-level radioactive waste (dry storage), intermediate-level radioactive waste	Operating
Point Lepreau Nuclear Generating Station	Maces Bay, New Brunswick	New Brunswick Power	High-level radioactive waste (wet storage)	Operating
Point Lepreau Waste Management Facility	Maces Bay, New Brunswick	New Brunswick Power	High-level radioactive waste (dry storage), intermediate-level radioactive waste, low-level radioactive waste	Operating
Port Hope Conversion Facility	Port Hope, Ontario	Cameco	Low-level radioactive waste	Operating
Port Hope Long-Term Waste Management Facility	Port Hope, Ontario	CNL	Low-level radioactive waste from past practices	Operating
Port Granby Long-Term Waste Management Facility	Port Granby, Ontario	CNL	Low-level radioactive waste from past practices	Operating
Radioactive Waste Operations Site 1	Tiverton, Ontario	OPG	Intermediate-level radioactive waste, low-level radioactive waste	Storage with surveillance
Welcome Waste Management Facility	Port Hope, Ontario	CNL	Low-level radioactive waste from past practices	Operating
Western Waste Management Facility	Tiverton, Ontario	OPG	High-level radioactive waste (dry storage)	Operating
Whiteshell Laboratories	Pinawa, Manitoba	CNL	High-level radioactive waste (dry storage)	Decommissioning

== See also ==
- List of nuclear fuel storage facilities in Canada
- Nuclear power in Canada
