= List of nuclear fuel storage facilities in Canada =

Nuclear fuel is stored in Canada at the following locations:

Province	Location	Storage type	References
Manitoba	Whiteshell Laboratories	Interim	
New Brunswick	Point Lepreau Nuclear Generating Station	Interim	
Ontario	Bruce Nuclear Generating Station	Interim	
Ontario	Chalk River Laboratories	Interim	
Ontario	Darlington Nuclear Generating Station	Interim	
Ontario	Pickering Nuclear Generating Station	Interim	
Quebec	Gentilly Nuclear Generating Station	Interim	

== See also ==
- List of nuclear waste storage facilities in Canada
- Nuclear power in Canada
