= Underwood Wind Farm =

Underwood Wind Farm (Enbridge Ontario Wind Farm)
- Country: Canada
- Location: Bruce County, Ontario, near the shores of Lake Huron
- Coordinates: 44.338967°N 81.458988°W
- Status: Operational

Power generation
- Units operational: 110 Vestas V82 wind turbines
- Make and model: V82 1.65MW
- Nameplate capacity: 181.5 megawatt (MW)

The Underwood Wind Farm (Enbridge Ontario Wind Farm) is a wind farm located in Bruce County, Ontario, near the shores of Lake Huron. It was developed by Enbridge Inc., a Canadian corporation better known for involvement in fossil fuels and their distribution.

The farm consists of 110 Vestas V82 wind turbines, each rated at 1.65MW, for a total nameplate capacity of 181.5MW. The project includes a substation to step up the power generated by the turbines to 230kV for transmission.

The Enbridge Ontario Wind Farm is not the only energy development in the area; Bruce County also boasts the Huron Wind wind farm, and the Bruce Nuclear Generating Station.

Production (MWh)
Year	January	February	March	April	May	June	July	August	September	October	November	December	Total
2008											2,849	26,719	29,568
2009	28,014	31,884	37,432	47,459	42,571	13,417	18,550	28,008	21,017	42,282	36,228	51,693	338,657
2010	50,812	29,120	34,472	44,768	29,444	22,603	21,354	25,082	45,222	44,649	50,520	64,769	382,883
2011	40,569	59,119	39,396	50,229	34,300	20,264	18,300	22,180	30,587	40,065	67,519	55,894	378,734
2012	61,344	49,782	54,188	44,549	24,258	29,158	17,979						170,132

== See also ==
- List of wind farms in Canada
- List of offshore wind farms
