= Inverhuron, Ontario =

Inverhuron
- Community
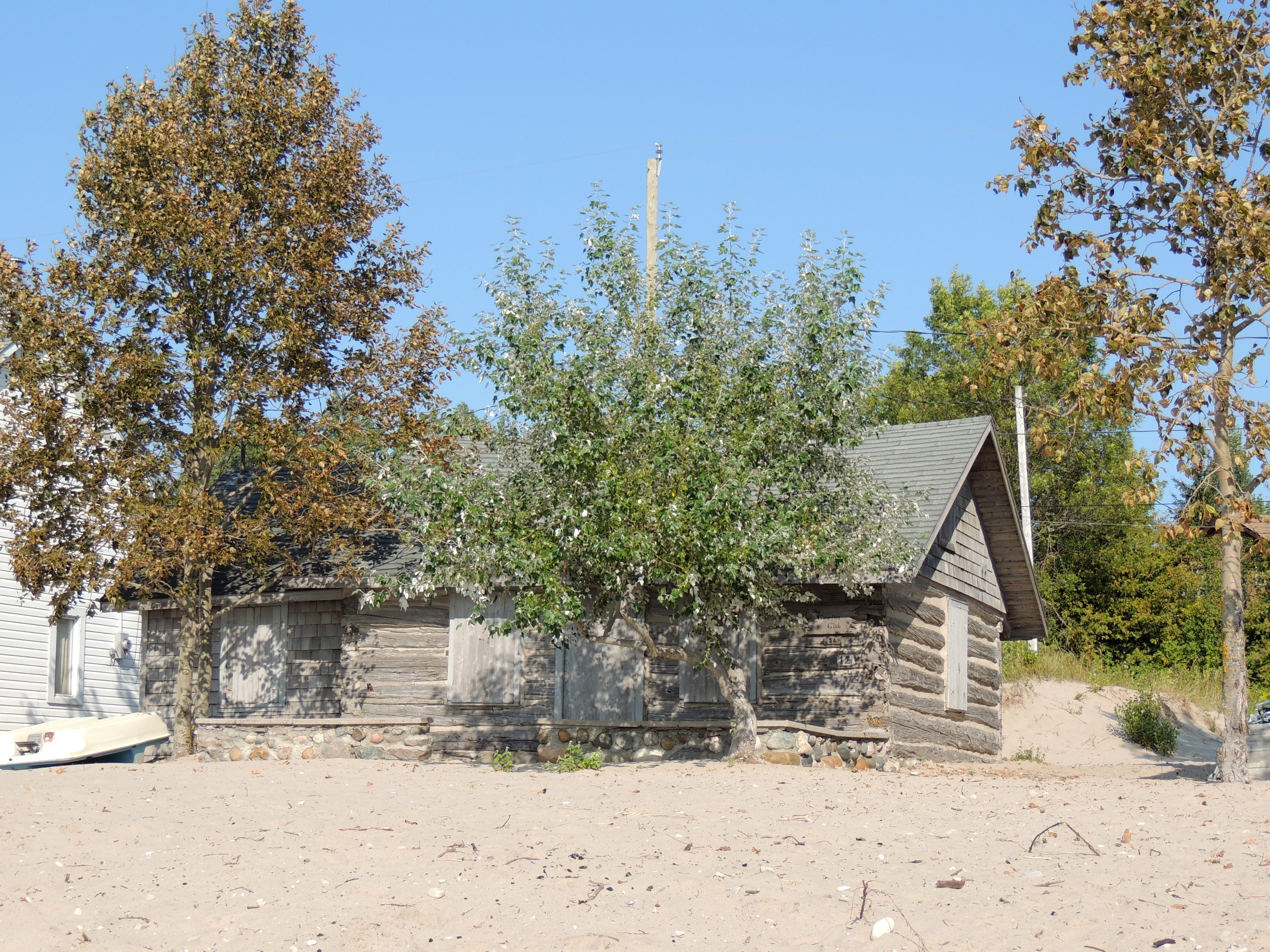
- Inverhuron Beach

- Location in southern Ontario
- Coordinates: 44°17′15″N 81°35′15″W
- Country: Canada
- Province: Ontario
- County: Bruce County
- Municipality: Kincardine
- Time zone: UTC-5 (EST)
  - Summer (DST): UTC-4 (EDT)

Inverhuron is a community located in Bruce County within the Municipality of Kincardine in the Canadian province of Ontario. The community includes approximately 200 permanent residents and 400 seasonal cottagers.

Inverhuron is located on the shore of Lake Huron, at the west end of County Road 15, just west of Highway 21 and the town of Tiverton. The village is located about halfway between Port Elgin and the town of Kincardine.

== History ==
Inverhuron was first settled by people of European descent in the early 1840s. In 1851 Superintendent of Schools of Bruce County, William Gunn opened a general store and post office. Gunn quickly followed with a school and library. By the end of the decade Inverhuron boasted lime kilns, saw and grist mills, a quarry, numerous tradesmen including carpenters, and a blacksmith shop. During this time, Inverhuron had a peak population of around 500 people. A major shipping centre with three large grain warehouses was established in the 1870s.

== The Inverhuron Fire ==
Inverhuron's days of success came to an abrupt stop on April 13, 1882 when fire struck the grain warehouses and the pier. The community experienced a devastating financial loss and many of the businesses shut down or relocated elsewhere. Another fire struck the community again in 1887. After the second fire, Inverhuron was finished financially and physically.

== Inverhuron Provincial Park ==
The village is home to the Inverhuron Provincial Park, which in 2005 reopened its doors to overnight camping with over 125 campsites, and was designated a Historic Park. Prior to the reopening, the park was a day-use only site catering to hikers and naturalists.

The park originally opened as a campground in 1959, until 1973, as one of the busiest in Ontario. It was closed in 1973 for camping because of safety concerns caused by the building of Ont Hydros Heavy Water Plant. That plant was closed by 2000.

== Electrical generation ==
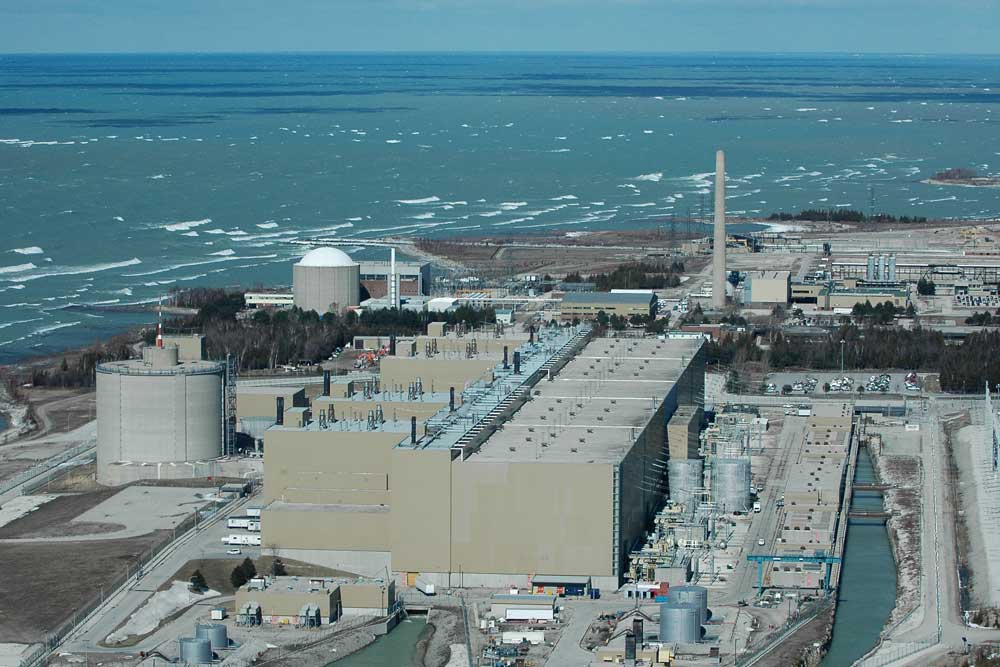
Bruce Nuclear

- Inverhuron is the site of Bruce Power, the Bruce Nuclear Generating Station, the largest nuclear power facility in the world.
- Ontario's first commercial wind farm, called "Huron Wind" is located on the outskirts of Inverhuron. The wind farm consists of 5 wind turbines.

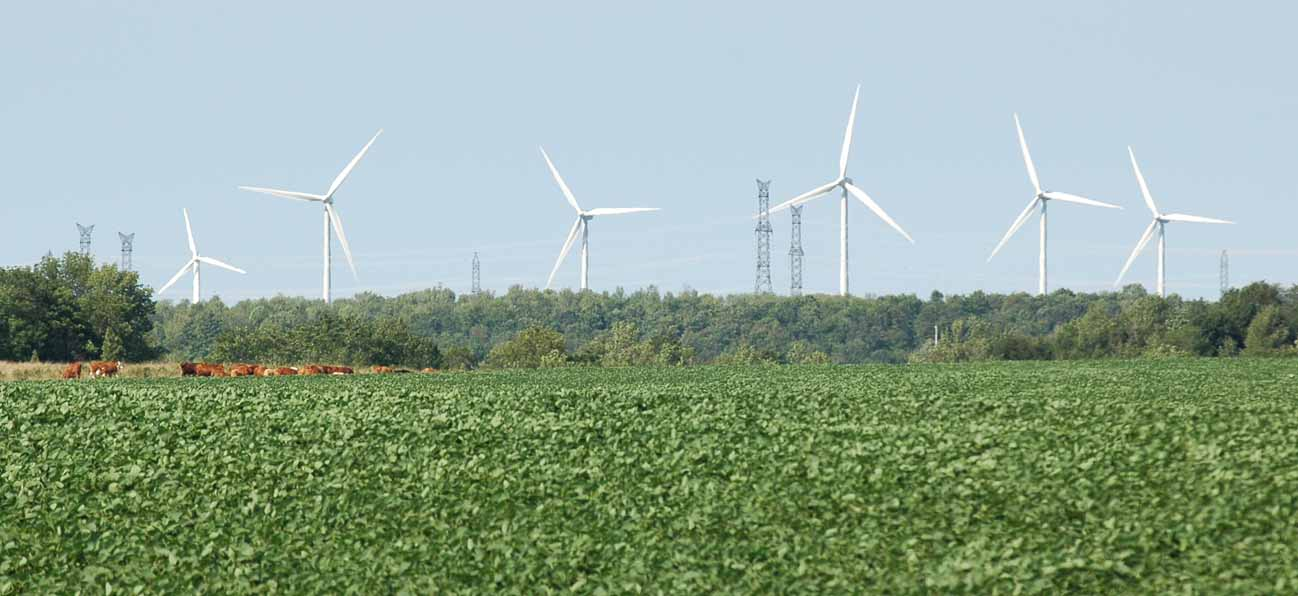
Huron Wind near Tiverton

== See also ==
- Bruce Nuclear Generating Station
- List of communities in Ontario
