= BPC Generation Infrastructure Trust =

BPC Generation Infrastructure Trust is a trust established by Ontario Municipal Employees Retirement System (OMERS) as part of the consortium to run the Bruce Nuclear Generating Station in Ontario. The trust owns 31.2% of Bruce Power, following the sale by British Energy of its share in 2003.
