= OPG 7 commemorative turbine =

Coordinates: 43.812226°N 79.073944°W

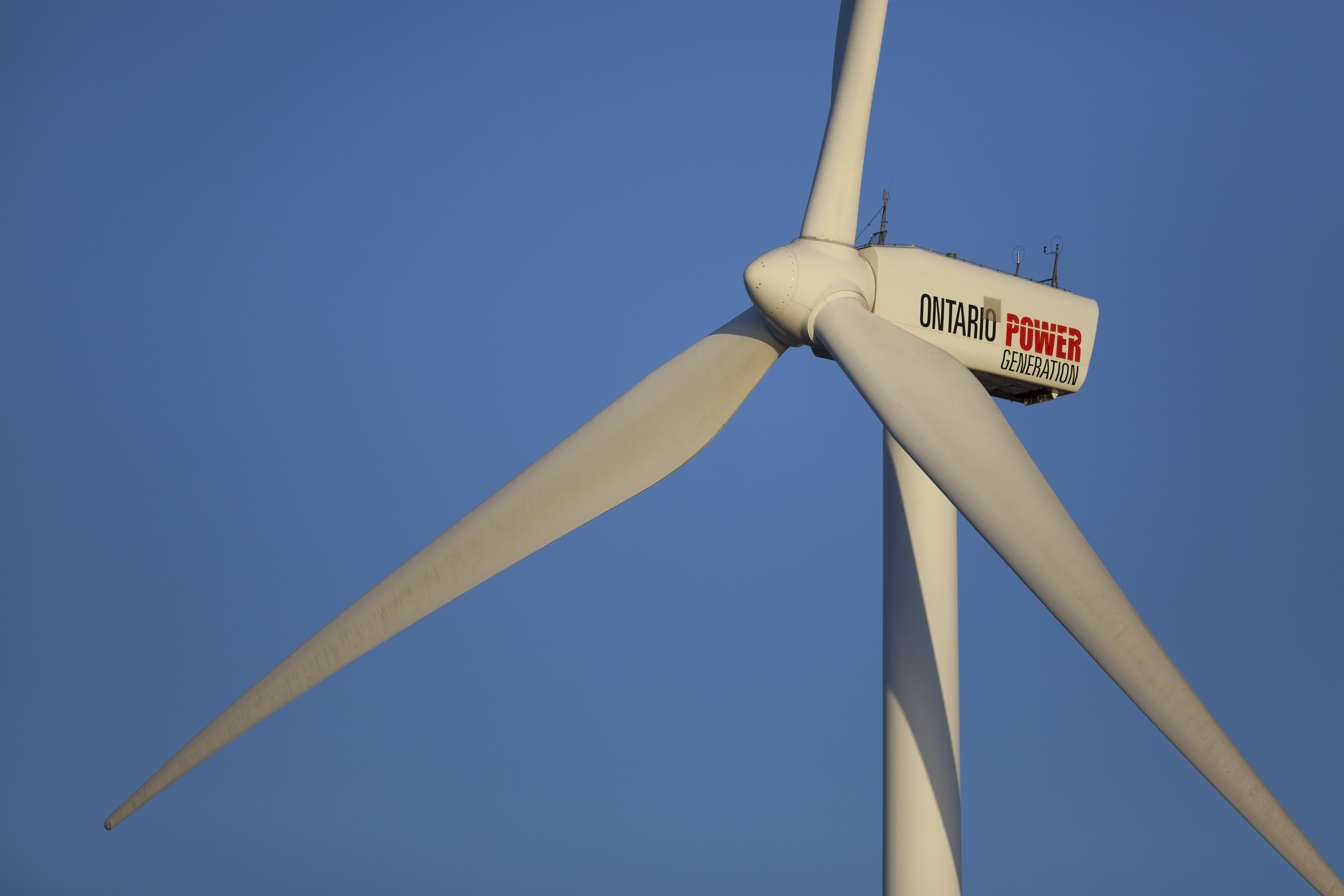
OPG 7 Gomberg Turbine

The OPG 7 Gomberg Turbine was a Vestas model V80-1.8MW wind turbine in Pickering, Ontario. At the time of its construction, it was one of the largest wind turbines in North America, a 117-metre high wind machine commissioned in 2001 and designed to produce enough power to satisfy about 600 average households. This electricity was also emission-free.

The commercial wind power industry has introduced steadily larger wind turbines to improve efficiency and the energy returned on energy invested. By 2008, the OPG 7 was no longer an unusually large wind turbine, with many new wind farms installing units of 3MW capacity and larger. However, this wind turbine was the only unit in the world to be directly on the site of a nuclear power plant.

On September 30, 2019, Ontario Power Generation began to dismantle the turbine as it had reached near the end of its design life. Demolition was completed by November 8.

== Technical details ==
The Pickering Wind Generating Station (GS) produced an average of about 2900 megawatthours (MWh) of electricity a year from 2001 to 2005. It generated about 18% of the electricity it would have if it had operated 24 hours a day for 365 days a year. This 18% capacity factor is low compared to other forms of generation, and is low compared to most commercial wind farms in North America, which normally average 25-40%. For comparison with European wind farms, the aforementioned figure for American wind farms would be identical. The low capacity factor results mainly from the lack of constant strong winds at the Pickering site, the wind shadow effect of nearby large buildings, and the high maintenance required for a prototype unit. The relatively low capacity factor is typical for wind turbines sited primarily as demonstration units. Other areas in Ontario have superior wind resources.

The wind turbine typically produced enough electricity to supply the annual electricity needs of about 330 average homes. At full power, it could supply about 1,800 homes at any given time. In comparison, any one of the six operating reactors at Pickering Nuclear Generating Station can supply enough electricity for over 500,000 homes. To rival the output of a nuclear plant, many wind turbines must be installed together into a large wind farm.

About 50 truckloads of concrete totalling some 318 tonnes formed the steel-reinforced tower base. The wind turbine components (blades, hub, nacelle, tower sections) traveled from the Vestas manufacturing plant in Denmark. A barge delivered the components to Oshawa, and trucks hauled them from there to the site. Power from the wind turbine traveled on underground cables into the electrical grid system.

The amount of electricity produced by the wind turbine depended on the strength and quality of the winds at any given time. The wind speed at which this turbine began to generate electricity (its cut-in speed) was about 16.9 km/h (10.5 mph). When operating, the blades turned at a constant speed of 15.7 revolutions per minute. If the wind speed was more than 90 km/h (56 mph), on-board computers shut off the turbine and feathered the blades to avoid potential damage from metal strain under such conditions.

Technicians could access the generator atop the tower by climbing a ladder inside the hollow tower. Because of this difficult access, public tours of the wind turbine were not permitted. However, the turbine featured prominently in the corporation's public relations campaigns, and there were occasional guided tours.

Ontario Power Generation's Evergreen Energy control room in North Bay monitored the wind turbine's operation 24 hours per day, 7 days a week.

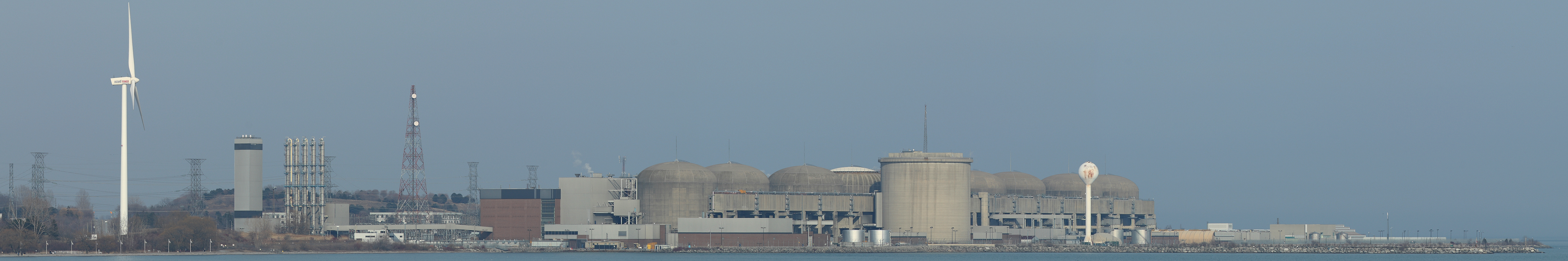
The Pickering Nuclear Generating Station, viewed from the west. The wind turbine is on the left.

== See also ==
- Ontario Power Generation
- Wind power in Canada
