= Huron Wind =

Wind farm in Ontario, Canada

Huron Wind wind farm
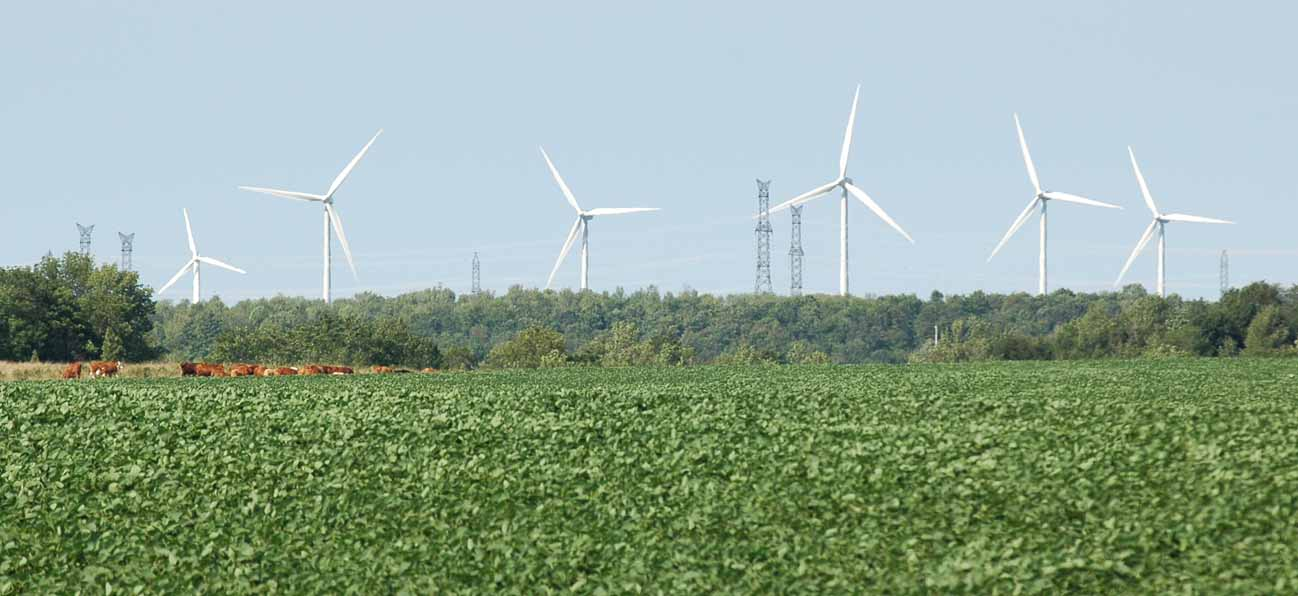
- Huron Wind wind farm
- Country: Canada
- Location: Inverhuron, Ontario near Tiverton
- Coordinates: 44.315988°N 81.548595°W
- Status: Operational
- Construction began: July 11, 2002
- Commission date: December 1, 2002
- Owners: BPC Generation Infrastructure Trust, Cameco Corporation and TransCanada PipeLines Limited

Power generation
- Units operational: 5 Vestas V80-1.8MW wind turbines
- Make and model: Vestas V80-1.8MW
- Nameplate capacity: 9 megawatt (MW)
- Capacity factor: 29.9%

External links
- Website: www.huronwind.com

Huron Wind is the first commercial wind farm in Ontario. It is located in the village of Inverhuron, Ontario near Tiverton, and consists of 5 Vestas V80-1.8MW wind turbines. It is next to the Bruce Power Visitor Centre, within sight of the Bruce Nuclear Generating Station, and adjacent to the larger Enbridge Ontario Wind Farm. Groundbreaking was on July 11, 2002, and it was declared officially in service on December 1, 2002.

The project is owned by a consortium of BPC Generation Infrastructure Trust, Cameco Corporation and TransCanada PipeLines Limited.

== See also ==
- List of wind farms in Canada
