= Deep Geologic Repository =

The Deep Geologic Repository Project (DGR) was a proposal by Ontario Power Generation (OPG) in 2002 for the site preparation, construction, operation, decommissioning and abandonment of a deep geological radioactive waste disposal facility for low and intermediate-level radioactive waste (L&ILW). In 2005, the municipality of Kincardine, Ontario volunteered to host the facility located on the Bruce nuclear generating station adjacent to OPG's Western Waste Management Facility (WWMF). The facility would have managed L&ILW produced from the continued operation of OPG-owned nuclear generating stations at the Bruce, Pickering Nuclear Generating Station and Darlington Nuclear Generating Station in Ontario. In May 2020, after 15 years of environmental assessment, OPG withdrew its application for a construction license on Saugeen Ojibway Nation Territory.

== Overview ==
Since 1974 Ontario Power Generation has stored low and intermediate-level waste (L&ILW) produced in its nuclear reactors at the Bruce, Pickering, and Darlington sites centrally on the Bruce nuclear site in its Western Waste Management Facility (WWMF). The proposed project was to store about 200,000 cubic meters of L&ILW from the operation of these three OPG-owned nuclear sites, about 90% of which would be low-level waste.

The proposed project was divided into two phases - pre-closure and post-closure periods. The pre-closure period would have lasted about 60 years and would have included site preparation and construction, operations, and decommissioning. The post-closure period would have included a period of institutional control followed by abandonment forever.

Low-level waste, which can be handled without special radiation protection, consists of materials such as mop heads, rags, paper towels, floor sweepings, and protective clothing used in nuclear stations during routine operation and maintenance. Intermediate level waste consists of non-fuel waste containing significant quantities of long-lived radionuclides. This includes materials such as used reactor core components, refurbishment wastes, ion-exchange resins and filters used to purify reactor water systems, and used reactor components such as pressure tubes. Intermediate-level waste cannot be handled without radiation protection measures. Much of the waste that would be placed in the DGR is already stored at the WWMF in engineered storage structures. The DGR would not house used nuclear fuel.

== History and Conceptualization ==
=== Government Policies ===
In April 2001, the Canadian federal government introduced an Act regarding the long-term management of nuclear fuel waste. Also known as the Nuclear Fuel Waste Act, this legislation came into effect on November 15, 2002. However, this legislation dealt only with the long-term management of used nuclear fuel (high-level waste), not L&ILW.

OPG stated that the introduction of the Nuclear Fuel Waste Act prompted the Municipality of Kincardine to initiate discussions with OPG regarding the long-term management of the L&ILW stored at the WWMF, which was only considered an interim waste management solution. Under the 1996 Government of Canada's Radioactive Waste Policy Framework, OPG was responsible to implement a long-term solution for managing its L&ILW. This includes the funding, organization, management, operation and disposal of waste, as well as responsibility over any other facilities required for their waste.

== Location and Site Selection ==
The proposed DGR was to be located 680 metres (2,230 ft) below ground, constructed in low-permeability limestone capped by 200 meters of low-permeability shale, which had remained stable for more than 450 million years. OPG states that the limestone is stable and predictable, with excellent isolating capabilities. The site is proposed to be constructed 1.2 kilometers from Lake Huron below the shelf of the lake which is connected to the Great Lakes Basin. The Basin is a drinking source for more than 40 million people in Canada and the United States.

=== Willing Host - Kincardine, Ontario ===
In 2002, the Municipality of Kincardine and OPG signed a Memorandum of Understanding (MOU). The purpose of the MOU was to set out terms under which OPG, in consultation with the Municipality of Kincardine, would develop a plan for the long-term management of L&ILW at the WWMF. As part of the MOU-related activities, Golder Associates, on behalf of OPG and the Ministry of Kincardine, conducted an Independent Assessment Study of three long-term waste management options: enhanced processing and surface storage, surface concrete vaults, and deep rock vaults. The study, published in 2004, included technical feasibility and socio-economic impacts, as well as a review of international practices for waste management. The assessment found that all three long-term management options were technically feasible and could be safely constructed and operated at the WWMF, and that no clear preference for any of the three options had been identified in public attitude and tourism research. Ultimately, the Municipality of Kincardine identified a deep geologic repository as its preferred option for the long-term management of L&ILW, and endorsed the project on April 21, 2004.

As the willing host for the project, the Municipality of Kincardine and adjacent municipalities would have received financial benefits and payments from OPG including:

- A one-time lump-sum payment to the Kincardine and the adjacent municipalities of $2.1 million, and an additional $1.6 million for only Kincardine, for future undetermined community projects, paid once the OPG was satisfied that there was a clear mandate from the population of Kincardine to the Kincardine Council in favour of the DGR.
- A further payment of $2.1 million to Kincardine and the Adjacent Municipalities within 90 days of the Canadian Nuclear Safety Commission (CNSC) granting a construction license to OPG, provided that OPG was satisfied that there were no other approvals required to construct the DGR and that there was no legal basis for the challenge of a construction license.
- Annual payments of $1.05 million to Kincardine and the adjacent municipalities.

The Municipality of Kincardine also passed a resolution stipulating that no used fuel would be placed in the repository.

On February 1, 2020, members of the Saugeen Ojibway Nation "overwhelmingly" voted to reject the proposal to construct a deep geologic repository at the Bruce nuclear power plant, "likely spelling an end" for the project in the vicinity of Kincardine.

== Process ==
=== Environmental Assessment ===
After the signing of the Hosting Agreement between OPG and the Municipality of Kincardine, the Environmental Assessment process for the project got underway by the Canadian Environmental Assessment Agency. The process was initiated by OPG submitting a proposal to prepare a site and build a DGR in December 2005. Under the Nuclear Safety and Control Act, approval for the project is required from the Canadian Nuclear Safety Commission (CNSC), who is the body responsible for the regulation of nuclear facilities in Canada. The request for CNSC approval triggered the requirement for a federal environmental assessment under sections 5 and 7 of the Canadian Environmental Assessment Act (CEAA, 1999). The project was listed under Part VI, section 19(g)(iii) of the Comprehensive Study List Regulations, and the CNSC, the responsible authority under CEAA, 1999 in relation to the project, recommended that the Minister of the Environment refer the environmental assessment to a review panel.

In June, 2007, the environmental minister announced the decision to refer the environmental assessment of the DGR project to a joint review panel. Following a 75-day public comment period, the Government of Canada issued Guidelines for the Preparation of the Environmental Impact Statement for the DGR for L&ILW (EIS Guidelines) and the Agreement to Establish a Joint Review Panel for the DGR by OPG within the Municipality of Kincardine (Panel Agreement) on January 26, 2009. The EIS Guidelines outlined the minimum information requirements for the EIS to be prepared by OPG to allow the detailed analysis of the potential environmental effects of the project. The EIS Guidelines also listed the requirements for the Licence to Prepare Site and Construct. The Panel Agreement outlined how the Panel would function and included the Panel Terms of Reference for the environmental assessment and the consideration of the licence application. OPG submitted its EIS in 2011.

=== Establishment of the Joint Review Panel, 2012-2015 ===
On January 24, 2012, the Joint Review Panel was established by the Minister of the Environment and the President of the CNSC under CEAA, 1999 and the Nuclear Safety and Control Act to undertake the review of the project. The Panel is both a Review Panel pursuant to sections 40, 41, and 42 of CEAA, 1999 for the purposes of carrying out an environmental assessment of the project, and a Panel of the commission, created pursuant to section 22 of the Nuclear Safety and Control Act, for the purposes of the review of the licence application under section 24 of the Nuclear Safety Control Act. When the Canadian Environmental Assessment Act, 2012 came into effect in July, 2012, the federal Minister of the Environment and the President of the CNSC amended the Panel Agreement, confirming that the project review was to continue under the new legislation.

Under the Terms of Reference for the review panel, the Panel was to obtain all of the information it required in order to prepare its report to the Minister of the Environment. In doing this, the Panel encouraged participation of government agencies, members of the public, and Aboriginal groups throughout the process. Participants had the opportunity to comment and provide their views to the Panel on whether the EIS and license application documents from OPG adequately addressed the requirements set out in the EIS Guidelines issued to OPG by the federal government. Throughout the process, public hearings were held in both Kincardine and Saugeen Shores, Ontario, and public comments were accepted online through the Canadian Environmental Assessment Registry. Funding was given to participants through CEAA's Participant Funding Program, giving groups the opportunity to have their comments heard throughout the process. The Panel also issued a total of 515 requests for additional information to OPG in order to obtain information requirement to meet the requirements of the EIS Guidelines. The Joint Review Panel published their 450-page Environmental Assessment Report endorsing the DGR project proposal on May 6, 2015. The Panel report, which was delivered to the Minister of the Environment, summarized the information received by the Panel, including comments from participants, and the Panel's conclusions related to the purpose, need and alternatives; design features and project development; waste management; effects on the natural environment; effects on human health and safety; malfunctions, accidents, and malevolent acts; social and economic aspects; Aboriginal interests, rights, and title; post-closure safety case; Lake Huron and the Great Lakes; and cumulative effects. The Panel concluded that the project was not likely to cause significant adverse environmental effects, taking into account the implementation of the mitigation measures committed to by OPG together with the mitigation measures recommended by the Panel.

=== Request for Additional Information, 2016 ===
On February 18, 2016, The Minister of Environment and Climate Change, the Honourable Catherine McKenna, requested additional information and further studies from OPG on the environmental assessment for the proposed DGR project. This came after the submission of the Joint Review Panel Environmental Assessment Report approving the project. The Panel requested that OPG provide additional information on three aspects of the project: (1) alternate locations for the project, (2) cumulative environmental effects of the project, and (3) an updated list of mitigation commitments for each identified adverse effect under the CEAA 2012. In requesting additional information from OPG concerning alternate locations, Minister Catherine McKenna requested "a study that details the environmental effects of technically and economically feasible alternate locations for the project, with specific reference to actual locations that would meet Ontario Power Generation’s criteria for technically and economically feasible" In a response letter from OPG dated April 15, 2016, OPG outlined their interpretation of Minister McKenna's request for additional information. OPG stated that they intended to provide an assessment of the environmental effects of two technically and economically feasible geologic regions in Ontario for a new L&ILW disposal facility. This included one assessment to consider a DGR located in a sedimentary rock formation located in Southern Ontario, and one assessment to consider a DGR located in a granite rock formation in central to northern Ontario. On December 28, 2016, OPG submitted their response to the request for additional information issued by Minister McKenna. In the submission, OPG applied the criteria of technical and economic feasibility to the entire province of Ontario, and provided the Panel with two geographic regions that met the criteria - Crystalline Rock, a massive region extending throughout central and northern Ontario, and Sedimentary Rock, encompassing nearly all of southwestern Ontario. Included in this response were a series of GPS coordinates mapping the perimeter of the Crystalline and Sedimentary alternate locations, which encompass more than 70% of the province of Ontario

=== Decision on the Project ===
On December 12, 2016, the Governor in Council, under subsection 54(4) of the Canadian Environmental Assessment Act, 2012, extended the time limit for the issuance of the Decision Statement for the proposed DGR project by 243 days. This extends the date of a decision on the project proposal into August, 2017.

Following the enactment of CEAA, 2012, amendments were made to the Agreement to Establish a Joint Review Panel for the DGR Project by OPG within the Municipality of Kincardine, Ontario, between the Minister of the Environment and the CNSC. Under these amendments, upon a submission of the Joint Review Panel Report, the Minister of the Environment shall take a decision with respect to the environmental assessment, and issue an environmental assessment decision statement under section 54(1) of CEAA, 2012. This decision must be in a manner consistent with the decision-making powers under section 52(1) of CEAA, 2012. The Joint Review panel, as a panel of the CNSC, may make a decision with respect to the license application pursuant to section 24 of the Nuclear Safety and Control Act. The environmental assessment decision statement from the Minister of the Environment will be considered as part of a decision by the CNSC to issue a license for the DGR project.

== Public reactions 2012-2020 ==
Significant opposition arose concerning the proposed DGR in both Canada and the U.S. Many communities around the Great Lakes passed resolutions against the project.

In 2013 Michigan's Senate adopted resolutions to urge Canadian officials to thoroughly review OPG's proposed DGR.

Multiple factors have induced strong opposition like the lack of precedent, the scope of rock testing and OPG's refusal to explore other locations for the DGR. These are discussed further below under the heading controversies. These issues have been condemned by citizens and NGOs such as the Stop the Great Lakes Nuclear Dump group. This group has gathered more than 62,000 signatures on a petition opposing the dump. The United Tribes of Michigan, representing 12 First Nations, is also opposed, as well as multiple Indigenous groups, First Nations, and Metis organizations in Canada. For example, the Saugeen First Nation voiced its opposition in May 2015.

Supporters of the DGR included the U.S. Environmental Protection Agency and the Michigan Department of Environmental Quality stating that they did not object to the project. Additionally, the municipality of Kincardine, and Saugeen Shores Council were in support of the DGR. Saugeen Shores councilors voted 7–1 in support of the DGR and directed the mayor to write to the Canadian Environmental Assessment Agency stating their political support.

=== Former OPG Employees Statements ===
In 2012 a retired Ontario Power Generation research scientist and chemist Frank R. Greening wrote to the review panel stating that OPG has "seriously underestimated, sometimes by factors of more than 100" the radioactivity of material to be buried. Moreover, during the joint panel review hearings of 2014, Dr. Frank Greening questioned OPG's estimates concerning the inventories it plans to bury in the DGR suggesting that the proposed plans may hold much more radioactive waste than originally proposed.

== Controversies ==
=== Lack of Research and Precedent for Constructing a DGR in Limestone ===
Since 1978, the CNSC has explored options for safely storing used nuclear waste in granite rock in the Canadian Shield. In 2008, CNSC began investigating sedimentary rock as a suitable geologic formation. While the CNSC website states, "since 1978, the CNSC has been involved in independent and internationally collaborative research focusing on long-term safety issues related to the disposal of radioactive waste and used nuclear fuel in sedimentary rock," their published research indicates that CNSC began researching sedimentary rock as a suitable repository location in 2014. Previous research focused on the feasibility of constructing a DGR facility in the Canadian shield, formed of igneous, not sedimentary rock. The Nuclear Waste Management Organization began its site selection to find a willing community to host a DGR site, "in a suitable rock formation". This is known as a volunteer first" policy, which means that, communities must put themselves forward to host the site, and would get financial compensation."

As of 2015, DGRs in Europe, the United States and Asia have been constructed in granite, tonalite, clay, and salt domes. As of 2016, there was a proposed site in Switzerland which may use clay as the geologic formation, however, the project was still in the research stage and site designation phase. There are multiple operational DGR sites worldwide, but only those constructed in granite geologic formations have operated without incident. as of 2015 there were DGR facilities in Finland which operated without incident constructed in crystalline rocks such as granite.

=== Accident risk and long-term safety ===
The lack of precedent in using limestone as a host formation for a DGR makes it very difficult to predict potential failures of the DGR that is not constructed in granite formation. OPG’s presentation of assumptions about the DGRs geochemistry is an underestimation of the potential risks of constructing a DGR in limestone formation, as seen in the case of the Waste Isolation Pilot Plant in New Mexico that leaked radioactive plutonium to the surface after a drum barrel leaked: "These accidents illustrate how difficult it is to predict potential failures of such a disposal system over millennia. For example, assumptions about the repository's geochemistry or the likelihood of drilling into it can lead to underestimation of the risks." Western University professor, Erika Simpson observed that DGRs constructed in geological formations other than granite have a risky track record. In an op-ed for a London newspaper, she wrote, "It didn’t help soothe critics that the only example OPG offered of a similar DGR — the Waste Isolation Pilot Plant in New Mexico — is no longer operating, after an underground fire and loss of containment resulted in radioactive releases to the surface in 2014. Likewise, Germany’s vaunted salt mine solution for low-level nuclear waste has also proven to be full of holes as thousands of litres of groundwater continue to leak into the Asse mine every day mixing with radioactive waste." Furthermore, research conducted in China revealed that Exposure to mechanical and chemical weathering has been proven to mechanically destabilize limestone, leading to geohazards including sinkholes and rapid erosion of limestone into soil. This could occur during construction and in the highly extended lifetime of the DGR.

== See also ==
- Schacht Asse II
- Waste Isolation Pilot Plant

== Works cited ==
- Joint Review Panel (May 6, 2015). "Deep Geologic Repository for Low and Intermediate Level Radioactive Waste Project" (PDF). Archived from the original (PDF) on August 11, 2015.
- "Nuclear Fuel Waste Act". laws-lois.justice.gc.ca. December 31, 2002.
- Ontario Power Generation (October 13, 2004). "DGR Hosting Agreement Between Ontario Power Generation And Municipality of Kincardine" (PDF). Archived from the original (PDF) on July 19, 2016.
