= Bruce Power =

Energy Company

Bruce Power Limited Partnership
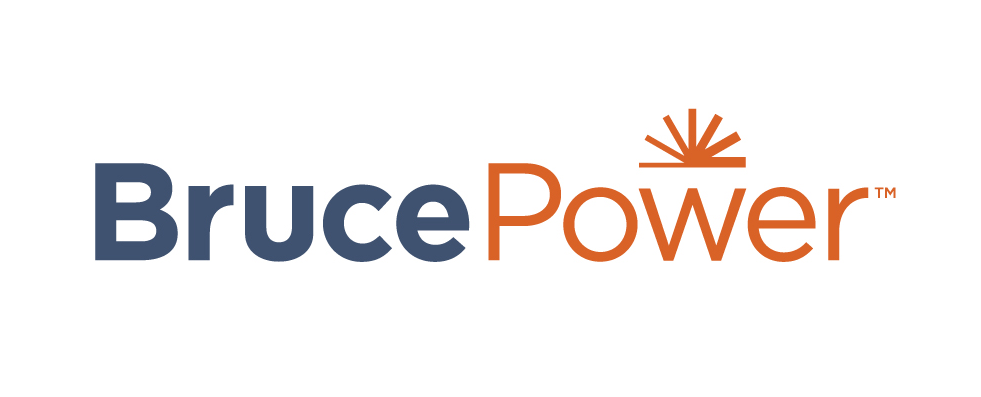
- Type: Limited partnership
- Industry: Electricity generation
- Founded: 2001 in Tiverton, Ontario
- Headquarters: Tiverton, Ontario, Canada
- Key people: Eric Chassard (President and CEO); Bob Aziz (Chairman); Robert Black (Vice-President)
- Products: Electricity & Radioisotopes
- Website: www.brucepower.com

Bruce Power Limited Partnership (BPLP) is a Canadian business partnership composed of several corporations. As of 2026, it exists as a partnership between OMERS Administration Corporation (48.26%), TC Energy Corporation (48.26%), Power Workers' Union Power 1 Limited Partnership (2.22%); the Society of United Professionals Trust, Bruce Power Employee Investment Trust, and the general partner, Bruce Power Inc. (1.26% aggregate). It is the licensed operator of the Bruce Nuclear Generating Station, located on the shores of Lake Huron, roughly 250 kilometres northwest of Toronto, between the towns of Kincardine and Saugeen Shores. It is the fourth-largest operating nuclear plant in the world by capacity.

Bruce Power operates eight nuclear reactors on Lake Huron, where it leases the Bruce site from Ontario Power Generation. With those eight units in operation, the facility has a capacity of 6,400 megawatts and typically supplies nearly 30 percent of the electricity used in Ontario's provincial power grid. Bruce Power became the world's largest operating nuclear facility in 2012, when Units 1 and 2 returned to operation after a multibillion-dollar refurbishment project. This achievement returned the site to full operating capacity for the first time in 17 years.

According to the company, "Bruce Power set a site record for production in 2015, generating 30 percent of Ontario's electricity at 30 per cent less than the average residential price of power.

== Current and planned projects ==
Bruce Power has invested more than $7 billion in its Bruce A and B facilities to restart and optimize the performance of its nuclear fleet over the last decade and has successfully carried out massive refurbishment and plant life extension projects on all of its operational units. It plans to refurbish Units 3–8 in a $13 billion project, beginning in 2020.

=== Bruce A Restart ===
Following the initial Bruce A Restart project (initiated during the British Energy incumbency) to return to service of Units 3 and 4 (completed in 2003/04), Units 1 and 2 underwent a multibillion-dollar refurbishment after years of dormancy. To facilitate this, on Oct. 17, 2005, Bruce Power announced a revision to its structure.

TransCanada Corporation, BPC Generation Infrastructure Trust, the Power Workers' Union (PWU) and the Society formed a new partnership, Bruce Power A Limited Partnership (BALP), that will obtain a sublease of the Bruce A facility. Cameco Corporation is not an investor in BALP. TransCanada and BPC will each own a 47.4% interest in BALP, and the remaining interest will be owned by the PWU and Society.

During its peak, the Bruce A Restart project was named the largest infrastructure project in Canada, and it was widely considered one of the most complex engineering challenges Ontario has ever seen.

Safety was a key component of the Restart initiative, with the project marking 24 million hours worked without a single acute lost-time injury.

In October 2012, Bruce Power returned Units 1 and 2 to commercial operation just weeks after synchronizing to Ontario's electricity grid for the first time since 1997 and 1995, respectively.

On 3 December 2015, Bruce Power president/CEO Duncan Hawthorne announced that it would spend $13 billion for a major overhaul of six of its Lake Huron reactors, starting in 2020. This is a postponement of a project initially planned for 2016; the change was made because the reactors should not require major work as soon as 2016. Bruce Power will assume any risk of financial overruns. The Ontario government was pleased with that news because the province would not be assuming any financial risk. However, the agreement will require Ontario to pay a higher price for electricity produced by Bruce Power. Naturally, the massive project will provide other benefits. "The agreement makes 23,000 jobs possible and supports an estimated $6.3 billion in annual, local economic development," said Energy Minister Bob Chiarelli.

=== Bruce Power Alberta ===
In 2008, Bruce Power applied for a licence to build a nuclear power plant at Cardinal Lake. Chief Executive Officer Duncan Hawthorne travelled to Peace River, Manning, and Grimshaw, Alberta, to personally inform the communities that Bruce Power had initiated a process to consider building western Canada's first nuclear power plant.

Through an application filed with the Canadian Nuclear Safety Commission, Bruce Power sought approval to prepare a site that could generate 4,000 MW of electricity from two to four reactors that would not produce greenhouse gases or air pollutants. As concerns over climate change continue to grow, the proposal could have seen the first unit ready as early as 2017, pending the successful completion of a full Environmental Assessment (EA) and consultations with the local communities.

As part of the decision-making process, open houses, workshops, and community meetings were held, and regular newsletters were issued to update residents and seek their input across Alberta.

Late in 2011, Bruce Power announced it had decided against advancing the proposal.

=== Isotope Production System ===
See also Bruce Nuclear Generating Station#Radioisotope production project

Bruce Power is developing Unit 7 as an Isotope Production System (IPS). In January 2022, it announced the completion of a facility to produce Lutetium-177 (Lu-177), which is used to produce the medical isotope Lutetium (177Lu) oxodotreotide. The company plans IPSes, which would produce other useful isotopes. The Lu-177 will be processed by a partner, ITM Isotope Technologies Munich SE (ITM), and marketed with its partner Saugeen Ojibway Nation under the name "Gamzook'aamin Aakoziwin."

== History ==
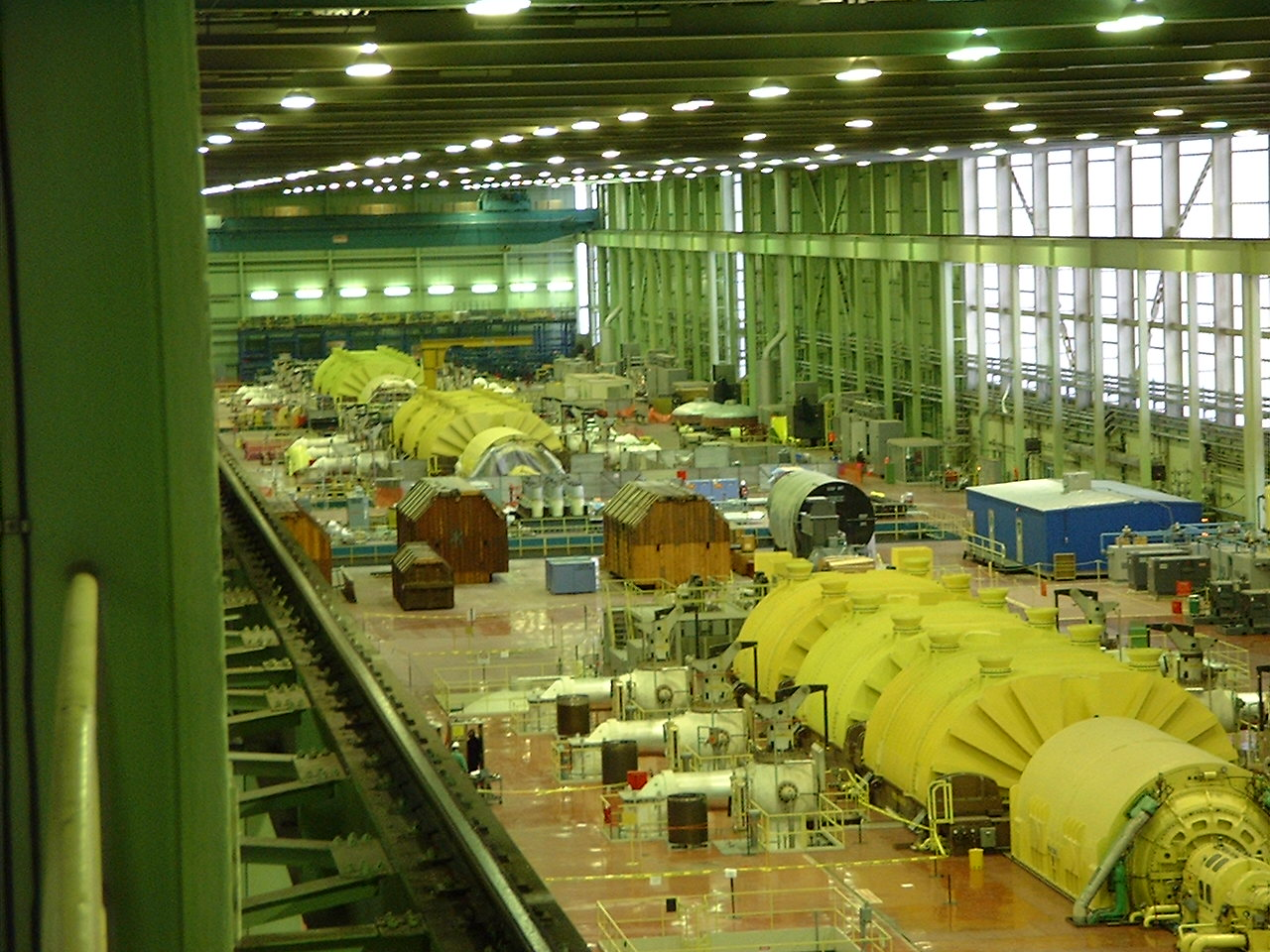
Bruce A Turbine Hall during the 2002–04 restart project

Bruce Power was founded as a Limited Liability Partnership in 2001 between British Energy (82.4%), Cameco Corporation (15%), the Power Workers' Union and The Society of Energy Professionals. Following the financial difficulties of British Energy in the Fall of 2002, the LLP became a wholly Canadian-owned Limited Partnership on Feb. 14, 2003

In May 2001, Bruce Power became the licensed operator of the Bruce Nuclear Generating Station in Tiverton, Ontario. The concession for operating the station was granted by Ontario Power Generation, one of the five successor companies of the defunct Ontario Hydro. Bruce A and Bruce B are equipped with eight CANDU nuclear reactors (four at each station). The initial four reactors were commissioned at Bruce A between 1977 and 1979, while Bruce B's were added between 1984 and 1987. The Bruce Power site at Tiverton was the world's largest nuclear generating facility until being surpassed by South Korea's Kori Nuclear Plant in 2016.

Since its creation, Bruce Power has successfully restarted all four Bruce A reactors.

On Oct. 7, 2003, Unit 4 returned to the Ontario grid for the first time since 1998, when it was laid up by the site's previous operators. It was then followed by Unit 3 on Jan. 8, 2004.

On Oct. 17, 2005, Bruce Power reached an agreement with the Ontario Power Authority and launched a $4.25 billion investment program to refurbish and restart Bruce A Units 1 and 2. Unit 1 was returned to the grid on Sept. 20, 2012, with Unit 2 following shortly thereafter on Oct. 18, 2012.

Restarting those units boosts Bruce Power's output to 6,300 MW, making Bruce Power the source for about 30 percent of Ontario's electricity on a typical day.

In 2014, Cameco announced it had agreed to sell its 32% shareholding in Bruce Power to BPC Generation Infrastructure Trust (Borealis Infrastructure) for $450 million. Upon completion of the sale, Borealis will become the majority partner of Bruce Power with 56.1 percent ownership.

In 2016, Bruce Power started a $13 billion refurbishment program at the Bruce Nuclear Generating Station. According to Bruce Power, this multi-year plan "will generate between 1,500 and 2,500 jobs on-site annually—and 18,000 across Ontario directly and indirectly—while injecting up to $4 billion annually into Ontario's economy."

== Nuclear Response Team ==
Nuclear Response Team
- Branch: Bruce Power
- Type: Incident response team
- Role: Special response in Bruce Power sites
- Location: Canada

Bruce Power maintains a small specialized unit, namely the Nuclear Response Team (NRT), which carries out tactical response operations in Bruce Power sites. NRT members are permitted to carry and use firearms alongside their powers of arrest.
