= Darlington Nuclear Generating Station =

Power station in Bowmanville, Ontario, Canada

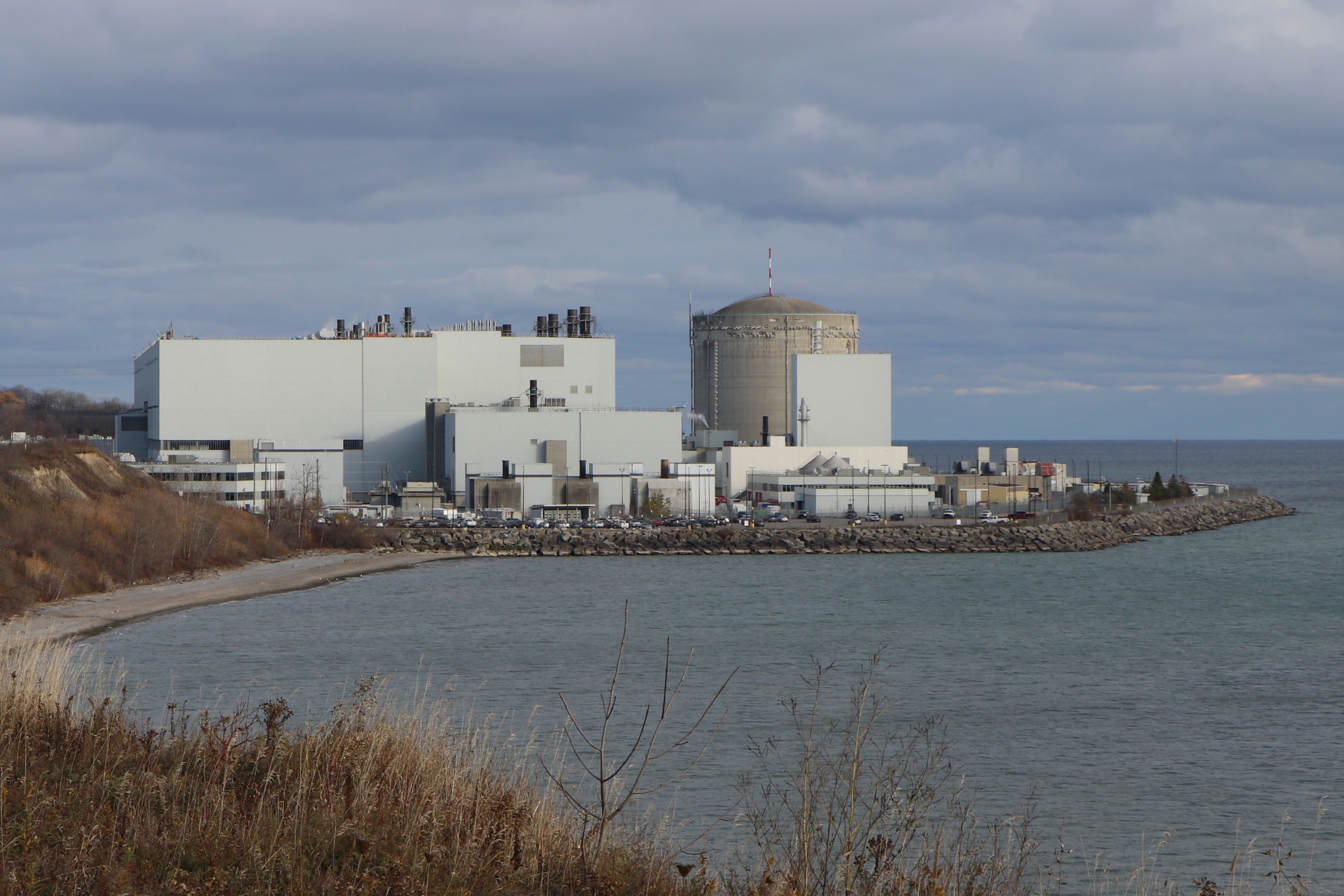
- Darlington Nuclear Generating Station in 2022
- Country: Canada
- Location: Clarington, Durham Region, Ontario
- Coordinates: 43°52′22″N 78°43′11″W
- Status: Operational
- Construction began: Unit 1: April 1, 1982; Unit 2: September 1, 1981; Unit 3: September 1, 1984; Unit 4: July 1, 1985; Unit 5: December 2, 2022
- Commission date: Unit 1: November 14, 1992; Unit 2: October 9, 1990; Unit 3: February 14, 1993; Unit 4: June 14, 1993; Unit 5: 2030 (planned)
- Construction cost: $14.4 billion CAD ($27.6 billion in 2025 dollars)
- Owner: Ontario Power Generation (OPG)
- Operator: Ontario Power Generation (OPG)
- Employees: 3000+

Nuclear power station
- Reactor type: CANDU PHWR
- Reactor supplier: AECL
- Cooling source: Lake Ontario
- Thermal capacity: 4 × 2776 MW_{th}

Power generation
- Units operational: 4 × 878 MWe (NET)
- Make and model: 4 × CANDU 850
- Units planned: 4 x 1200 MW (ACR-1000); 4 x 300 MW (BWRX-300)
- Units cancelled: 4 x 1200 MW (ACR-1000)
- Units under const.: 1 x 300 MW (BWRX-300)
- Nameplate capacity: 3512 MW
- Capacity factor: 63.22% (2017); 82.90% (lifetime)
- Annual net output: 23,562 GWh (2020); 776,175 GWh (lifetime)

External links
- Website: Darlington Nuclear
- Commons: Related media on Commons

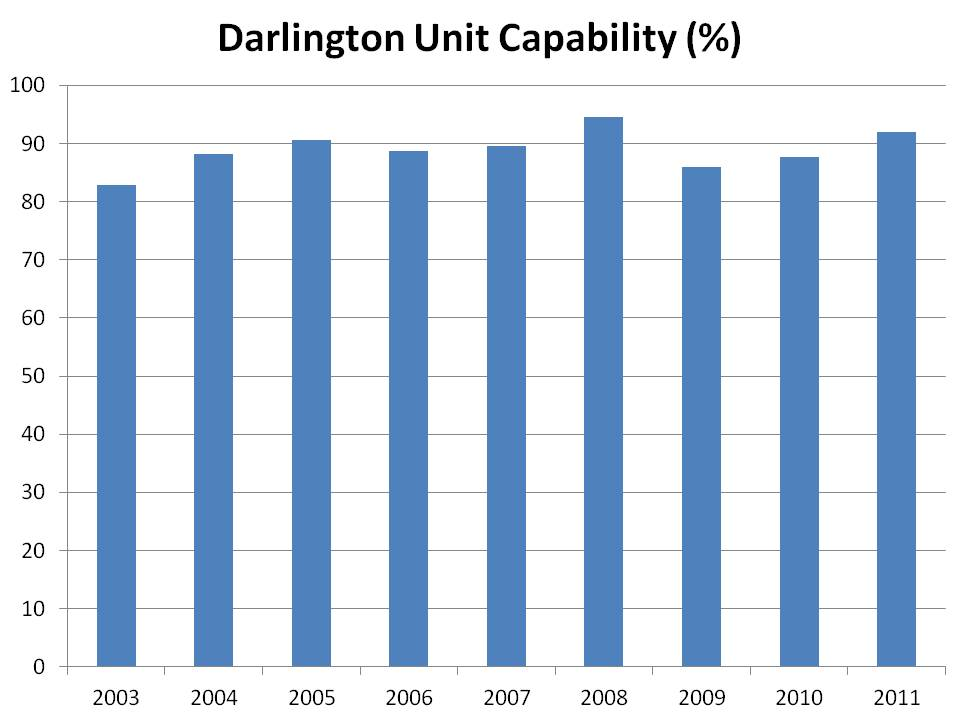
Darlington Unit 1-4 Capability (Capacity Factor), 2003-2011

Darlington Nuclear Generating Station is a Canadian nuclear power station located on the north shore of Lake Ontario in Clarington, Ontario. It is a large nuclear facility comprising four CANDU nuclear reactors with a total output of 3,512 MWe when all units are online, providing about 20 percent of Ontario's electricity needs, enough to serve a city of two million people. The reactor design is significantly more powerful than those used in previous CANDU sites at Pickering and Bruce, making its 4-unit plant the second-largest in Canada behind the 8-unit Bruce. It is named for the Township of Darlington, the name of the municipality in which it is located, which is now part of the amalgamated Municipality of Clarington.

The plant began construction in September 1981 and planned to start initial operations in 1985. Several delays ensued, and the construction start on Units 3 and 4 was put off until 1984 and 1985. Unit 2 entered operation in 1990, followed by Unit 1 in 1992, and Units 3 and 4 in 1993. The delays and resulting cost overruns have made Darlington a primary case study for the anti-nuclear movement in Canada, and was one of the main reasons Ontario Hydro was broken up in 1999 and its debts paid off by special billings. After initial operations and shakeout, it is often among the most reliable plants in the world in terms of capacity factor. The plant completed a mid-life upgrade in February 2026.

Room for a second four-reactor unit had been in place since the original site selection, with a large area to the east of the current plant set aside for what was known as Darlington B. In 2006, Ontario Power Generation began the process of applying to build a two-unit plant on the B site. This project was cancelled in 2013 when the estimated cost was far beyond initial projections. In 2020 plans started to install a much smaller BWRX-300 small modular reactor on the B site, which are ongoing as of 2023. This "Darlington New Nuclear Project" was identified as a priority project by Canadian Prime Minister Mark Carney in September 2025.

== History ==
=== Planning, controversy and delays ===
Darlington was part of a large nuclear buildout planned by Ontario Hydro based on their predictions of almost linear growth in power demand at 7% per year essentially forever. Based on this predicted growth, the company stated that nuclear would account for 60 to 70% of the province's supply by 1990, and for that to occur, a large number of new reactors would have to be built. Land at the Darlington Provincial Park was identified as a potential site in the late 1960s, and Hydro purchased the plot in 1971 as an "energy centre". The first official plans to develop the site for nuclear were approved in 1973, apparently at the personal direction of Conservative Ontario premier Bill Davis without discussion by cabinet. At the time, the construction cost of the four-unit plant was estimated at $4.5 billion (equivalent to $31 billion in 2025), and construction would start in 1979. Public hearings began in 1974 and the general plans were finalized in 1976. The official go-ahead from the government was given on 18 April 1977, and the first contracts for construction let on 8 June 1978.

Through the rest of the 1970s, Hydro's future demand estimates were repeatedly attacked as unrealistic. The 1973 oil crisis and subsequent 1973–1975 recession led to greatly reduced growth rates, which reached zero in the province in 1977. As these concerns became more public, in 1975 Davis formed two independent committees, the Porter Commission and the Select Committee, both of whom concluded the predictions were far too high. Shortly after, the recently formed Ministry of Energy and the public Energy Probe foundation both released reports stating that the company's predictions for power use in 2000 were some 12 gigawatts too high, about three Darlingtons. In 1980, the Porter Commission delivered its final report, which stated the growth rate would be closer to 4% and suggested Hydro should abandon its plans for further nuclear plants and should instead develop smaller plants and implement demand management. This advice was pointedly ignored.

=== Construction starts, and pauses ===
The ongoing expansion plan was paid for by debt financing primarily through the sale of commercial bonds. Given the public scrutiny and generally negative reports, in 1976 Energy Minister Darcy McKeough told Hydro to slow down its demands and spread out the budget or the province would not guarantee the company's bonds. Darlington was one of several major programs for that time frame, including major expansions at Pickering and Bruce. Hydro responded by pushing back the construction start to 1981, with the first reactor coming online in 1985 and then the other three after that, one every 12 months. This pushed the budget up only slightly to $3.9 billion in construction and another $1 billion for heavy water. A more detailed budget, this time accounting for inflation during the expected construction period through 1988 put the final figure at $7.4 billion, equivalent to $31 in 2025. The time-frame was deferred and advanced several times over the next few years.

In 1981, Hydro finally responded to the concerns about overbuilding with a new prediction of 38 gigawatts demand in 2000, a full 52 gigawatts less than their predictions made in 1978. (Note: The actual capacity in 2000 was approximately 30 GW.) A 1984 report puts the future growth at 3% at least until 1992, which, along with high interest rates of the era, led the company to cancel any future buildout for this period. Even the post-1992 demand seemed uncertain and no new reactors were scheduled. The company turned its attention to grid improvements.

Construction began on schedule, with the "first pour" in June 1981. In 1982, the construction starts for Units 3 and 4 were pushed back several years to 1985. In 1983, suffering from overcommitment and understaffing, Hydro management ordered the project be delayed. The engineering staff on Darlington were assigned to other projects, including the expansions at Pickering and Bruce that were now about to come online. At the time, Hydro calculated the budget to have risen to $10.9 billion. The pause ended in early 1985, but not all of the original staff were assigned back to the project, and new staff had to be hired and trained. Additionally, during the pause a number of issues in the design were found, this being the first plant of the ~900 MW size to be built, introducing further delay in getting construction started again. At this time, the company had already spent the original $7 billion budget, and was now predicting another $4 billion would be needed to complete it. Completion of Unit 2 was now predicted to be in 1988.

=== Reexamination, go-ahead ===
On 2 May 1985, the 1985 Ontario general election resulted in the ruling Conservatives receiving a minority government, but a vote of no confidence in June ended their 42-year rule and brought David Peterson's Liberals to power with support by Bob Rae's NDP. Peterson had previously voiced his support for an immediate stop to Darlington. Rae relied on the support of the Hydro worker's union, CUPE Local 1000, who strongly supported the project. As part of the inter-party deal, Peterson promised to not stop construction while a new commission considered the issue.

The Select Committee was reformed and produced a new report in 1986. By this time the Chernobyl disaster had cast a further pall over the field, and Hydro had further reduced its predictions to 30 GW in 2000. The committee provisionally accepted the continuing construction of Darlington Units 1 and 2, but suggested a wait-and-see period before allowing completion of Units 3 and 4. It was during this period that the labour force at the site reached its peak of 7,000, making it the largest construction program in North America at that time. Cabinet approved the continued construction in 1987, before the next election.

Now seven years into a four-year building schedule, during a period of high interest rates, the budget continued to balloon. An additional $3.3 billion can be attributed to the interest during these delays. An additional $1.2 billion had to be added to the bill as Hydro changed their accounting procedures and moved several items, including training the operators, from operational costs to capital. Design changes due to changing safety requirements after the Three Mile Island accident and Chernobyl added a further $0.9 billion, and other unforeseen changes to construction, including site works, added another $1 billion. As a result, the final cost was put at $13.8 billion, a full $6.8 billion, or 86%, over the 1981 estimate.

=== Commissioning and initial operations ===
Unit 2 was the first to start construction on 1 September 1981. Unit 1 followed on 1 April 1982. Construction started on Unit 3 on 1 September 1984, and Unit 4 on 1 July 1985. Construction on 1 and 2 continued with the pauses noted above, but 3 and 4 were significantly scaled back. Unit 2 entered commercial service on 9 October 1990, and Unit 1 on 14 November 1992. The final two units were much closer to competition by this point, with Unit 3 entering service on 14 February 1993, and Unit 4 shortly after on 14 June.

Almost immediately on entering service, the power shafts on Unit 2 connecting the steam turbines to the alternators were found to suffer from cracking, which led to lengthy shutdowns in 1990 and 1991. This was addressed with a new shaft design installed in May 1992. The other three units had already received the original design, but for initial operations they were modified to avoid the problem while awaiting the new shafts, expected in May 1993 for Unit 1 and in March and August 1994 for Units 3 and 4. In early 1991 it was found that vibrations in the fuel assemblies in Unit 2 was causing them to become damaged. This was ultimately traced to a problem in the pumping system that injected a 150 Hz pressure fluctuation. Changing the impellers to increase the rate to 210 Hz solved the problem.

As a result of these issues, the initial availability, or capacity factor was low. During its first three and a half years of operation, Unit 2 achieved a lifetime load factor of only 29.9% while Unit 1, between July 1992 and the end of June 1993, achieved a load factor of 56.8%. The changes, especially the new power shafts, also added another $600 million to the final bill.

=== Breakup of Hydro ===
The Peterson government fell in 1990, resulting in Rae's NDP taking the province in the midst of a recession. The Darlington plant was still under construction, and still as politically radioactive as it had been through the 1980s. Rae made the decision to complete the plant, but to ensure that these sorts of overruns did not occur again, he appointed Maurice Strong, former CEO of Petro-Canada, to become CEO of Hydro and shake up the company. Strong asked Bill Farlinger, a laissez-faire market-economy advocate, to suggest ways to reform the company. As a result of Farlinger's suggestions, Strong began the process of breaking up the company into five divisions, each with a separate area of responsibility. As part of these plans, any future nuclear expansion was ended. When Mike Harris' Conservatives regained power in 1995, Harris appointed Farlinger as CEO of Hydro and the plans were amended to sell off the various divisions once the split was complete.

By this time, Hydro had $34 billion in debt, almost half of that due to Darlington and a significant portion of the rest from construction and expansions on Pickering and Bruce. Additional charges were due to cost overruns on the boilers at these plants, which ran to $850 million. More was added due to the take-or-pay contracts with Rio Algom and Denison Mines for supply of uranium that were set at market rates prior to the collapse of worldwide uranium prices in the late 1980s. This led Hydro to break the contracts in 1991 at another $717 million charge.

After much debate, the decision was made to isolate the debts into a separate crown corporation, the Ontario Electricity Financial Corporation. Ontario Hydro officially ended operations on 31 March 1999. Their final financial statements listed long-term debts of $26.2 billion and assets totalling $39.6 billion, but the government concluded the fair value of the assets was far below the claimed price. Their valuations calculated a resulting $19.5 billion of stranded debt, which was then paid off as a separate Debt Retirement Charge on customer bills from 2003 until 31 March 2018.

== Commercial operations ==
In April 1999 Ontario Hydro was split into 5 component Crown corporations with Ontario Power Generation (OPG) taking over all electrical generating stations. The Darlington reactors have been among the best performing in OPG's CANDU fleet, including a top year in 2008 in which the plant achieved a combined 94.5% capacity factor. In June 2016, the World Association of Nuclear Operators (WANO) named Darlington one of the safest and top-performing nuclear stations in the world - for the third time in a row.

In March 2017, Ontario Power Generation (OPG) and its venture arm, Canadian Nuclear Partners, announced plans to produce Plutonium-238 as a second source for NASA. Rods containing Np-237 would be fabricated by Pacific Northwest National Laboratory (PNNL) in Washington State and shipped to OPG's Darlington Nuclear Generating Station where they would be irradiated with neutrons inside the reactor's core to produce Pu-238.

== Electrical Output ==
The graph represents the annual electricity generation at the site in GWh.

As of the end of 2025, the total lifetime output of the facility was 797,956 GWh.

== Cost overruns ==
The Darlington station incurred massive cost overruns during its construction.

The initial cost estimate for the station was $3.9 billion CAD in the late 1970s, which increased to $7.4 billion in 1981 when construction was started. A year-long period of public hearings and study by an Ontario government all-party committee finished in 1986 with the decision to proceed with the project, which had then risen to $7 billion in actual and committed costs. The final cost was $14.4 billion CAD, almost double the initial construction budget, even adjusted for inflation.

Hydro was not allowed to charge for the cost of construction until the plant was actually delivering power to customers. As such, all of the cost overruns in the project until 1990 had to be taken on as debt, during a period of historically high interest rates. In 1989, Hydro filed its latest 25-year Demand Supply Plan, Providing the Balance of Power, calling for another 10 reactors and 32 fossil plants. In 1993, this plan was withdrawn, after Darlington entered service and the province now had a surplus of generation and was forced to sell at very low and sometimes negative prices. This, combined with the enormous debt the company had taken on to finance the plant, led to the decision to break up the company into several smaller ones.

The project was adversely affected by declining electricity demand forecasts, mounting debt of Ontario Hydro, and the Chernobyl disaster, which necessitated safety reviews in mid-construction. Each delay incurred interest charges on debt, which ultimately accounted for 70% of the cost overruns. Inflation during 1977 to 1981 was 46 percent, according to Canada's Consumer Price index. In addition interest rates were running at 20 percent. Improper choice of equipment and a six-month labour stoppage of electrical workers also yielded some of these costs and delays. Discussion of who is to blame for the costs and subsequent debts associated with Darlington often arise during provincial election campaigns, and are often mentioned in anti-nuclear literature.

== Refurbishment project ==
After public hearings, the Canadian Nuclear Safety Commission announced in December 2015 the renewal of Darlington’s power reactor operating licence, for 10 years from Jan. 1, 2016, until Nov. 30, 2025, to allow for the refurbishment of the Darlington station, which began in October 2016.

On October 14, 2016, OPG began Canada’s largest clean infrastructure project—the refurbishment of all four of Darlington’s reactors. According to the Conference Board of Canada, the $12.8 billion investment will generate $14.9 billion in economic benefits to Ontario, including thousands of construction jobs at Darlington and at some 60 Ontario companies supplying components for the work. The project is scheduled for completion by 2028 and will ensure safe plant operation through 2055.

- The first reactor to be refurbished was Unit 2. In March 2020, it was announced that the refurbishment of Unit 2 was complete, and in April 2020, the reactor achieved criticality for the first time since being reassembled. The reactor was reconnected to the grid in June.
- The second reactor to be refurbished was Unit 3. On July 8, 2023, the CNSC removed the 35% full power hold limit from Unit 3, allowing the unit to operate at 100% full power.
- The third reactor to be refurbished was Unit 1. On November 14th, 2024, the CNSC removed the 35% full power hold limit from Unit 1, allowing the unit to run up to 100% full power.
- The fourth reactor to be refurbished was Unit 4. On March 7th, 2026, the CNSC removed the final regulatory hold point from Unit 4, and the unit was fully reconnected to the grid by March 10th.

The project was completed 4 months ahead of schedule and $150 million under budget. However, despite the completed refurbishment, since August 3rd, 2026, Units 2, 3, and 4 have not been generating, and there have only been 19 days in 2026 where all four units have been operating simultaneously. As of August 31st, none of the three units have resumed generation.

== Darlington B ==
In 2006, OPG started the federal approvals process to build new nuclear units at the site of its Darlington Nuclear Station. The project proposal involved the construction and operation of up to four nuclear units, with capacity of up to 4,800 MW.

A request for proposals (RFP) process for design and construction resulted in bids from Areva NP, Westinghouse, and Atomic Energy of Canada Limited (AECL). In June 2009, the Government of Ontario put the RFP process on hold, citing unexpectedly high bids, and the uncertainty surrounding the future of the only compliant bidder (AECL).

In August 2011, the three-member Joint Review Panel (mandated by the Ontario Ministry of the Environment and the Canadian Nuclear Safety Commission) released a report finding that the Darlington new build project would not result in any significant adverse environmental impacts (after taking into account mitigation measures). Following the report, the federal government approved the Environmental Assessment.

In October 2013, the Ontario government declared that the Darlington new build project would not be a part of Ontario's long term energy plan, citing the high capital cost estimates and energy surplus in the province at the time of the announcement.

== Darlington New Nuclear ==
In November 2020, Ontario Power Generation (OPG) announced plans to build a small modular reactor (SMR) at Darlington Nuclear Generating Station. OPG will work with GE Vernova Hitachi Nuclear Canada to build the SMR.

On December 2, 2022, Ontario Power Generation officially broke ground on the new build Darlington SMR (Darlington B) project. The first unit to be constructed is a GVH BWRX-300 unit.

Construction has started in May 2025, with the reactor expected to come online in 2030. On 1 May 2026, the reactor's first module—the steel & concrete basemat—was set in place.

== Waste ==
Low and intermediate level waste from Darlington is stored at the Western Waste Management Facility (WWMF) at the Bruce nuclear site near Kincardine, Ontario. OPG has proposed the construction and operation of a deep geologic repository for the long-term storage of this low and intermediate level waste on lands adjacent to WWMF.

On May 6, 2015 the Joint Review Panel issued the Environmental Assessment (EA) Report recommending the approval of the Deep Geologic Repository for Ontario’s low and intermediate level waste to the federal government.

In February 2016, the Federal Minister of Environment and Climate Change delayed a decision on OPG’s DGR, causing a pause in the timeline for the environmental assessment decision to be issued. OPG has since committed to completing further DGR studies by the end of 2016.

The Darlington Waste Management Facility provides dry storage for the used fuel from Darlington, after an initial period in a water-filled storage bay. The facility was opened in 2007, reportedly on schedule and on budget. The Nuclear Waste Management Organization is seeking a site in Canada for a permanent repository for used fuel from all of Canada's nuclear reactors.

== Records ==
2020: On Tuesday, September 15 Darlington Unit 1 broke the world record for continuous generation at 963 days, a record previous held by Pickering Unit 7 at 894 days for 22 years until it was broken in 2016 by Heysham 2 in the UK. As of September 28, 2020, Unit 1 was at 976 days.

2021: On Thursday, February 4 at sometime after 11PM Darlington Unit 1 finally went down for maintenance after 1,106 continuous days of generation, setting the world nuclear operation record and world thermal plant generation record.

== Spill ==
In 2009, more than 200,000 litres of water containing trace amounts of tritium and hydrazine spilled into Lake Ontario after workers accidentally filled the wrong tank with tritiated water. However the level of the isotope in the lake was less than 1 percent of the regulatory limit and consistent with normal operational activities. The total radiation content of the leaked water was approximately 250 Curies, 9.25 terabecquerels or 44.8 MBq/L (0.81 mSv). For comparison, the average background radiation dose in Canada is ~2.4 mSv/year, a chest x-ray is 0.1 mSv, and a CAT scan is 5.0 to 10.0 mSv.

== See also ==
- List of largest power stations in Canada
- List of nuclear reactors in Canada
- Nuclear power in Canada
  - Pickering Nuclear Generating Station
  - Bruce Nuclear Generating Station
  - Point Lepreau Nuclear Generating Station
