= Pickering Nuclear Generating Station =

Nuclear power plant in Canada

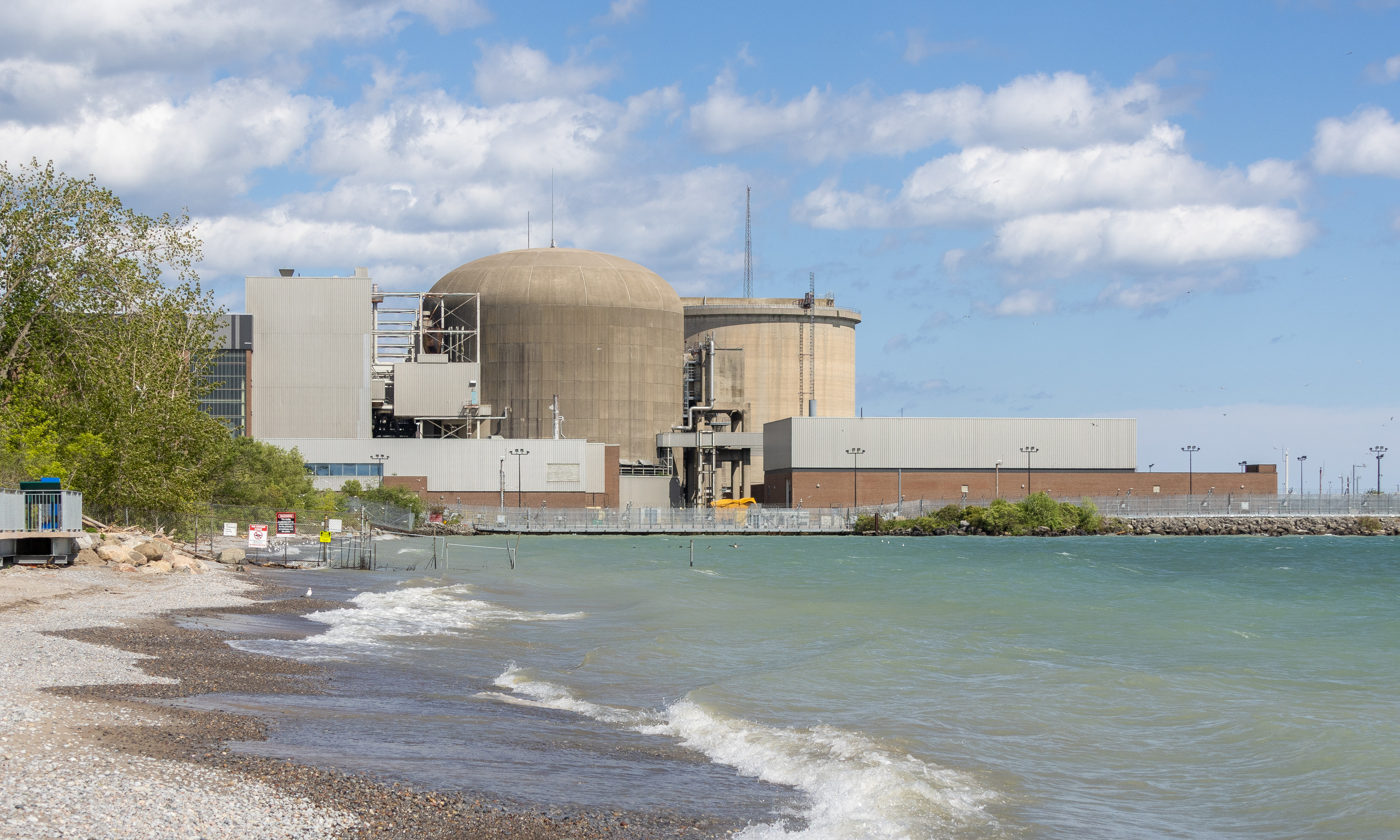
- Unit 4 Facing east with the large vacuum building and water tower in the background

- Location within Canada
- Country: Canada
- Location: Pickering, Durham Region, Ontario
- Coordinates: 43°48′42″N 79°03′57″W
- Status: Operational
- Construction began: Unit 1: June 1, 1966; Unit 2: September 1, 1966; Unit 3: December 1, 1967; Unit 4: May 1, 1968; Unit 5: November 1, 1974; Unit 6: October 1, 1975; Unit 7: March 1, 1976; Unit 8: September 1, 1976
- Commission date: Unit 1: July 29, 1971; Unit 2: December 30, 1971; Unit 3: June 1, 1972; Unit 4: June 17, 1973; Unit 5: May 10, 1983; Unit 6: February 1, 1984; Unit 7: January 1, 1985; Unit 8: February 28, 1986
- Decommission date: May 28, 2007 (A2); Oct 31, 2008 (A3); Oct 1, 2024 (A1); Dec 31, 2024 (A4)
- Construction cost: $716 million CAD (A station) $3.84 billion CAD (B station)
- Owner: Ontario Power Generation (OPG)
- Operator: Ontario Power Generation (OPG)
- Employees: 3000+

Nuclear power station
- Reactor type: CANDU-500
- Reactor supplier: AECL
- Cooling source: Lake Ontario
- Thermal capacity: 4 × 1744 MW_{th}

Power generation
- Units operational: 2 × 518 MWe (NET B 6, 8); 1 × 520 MWe (NET B 7); 1 x 530 MWe (NET B 5)
- Make and model: 4 × CANDU 500B
- Units decommissioned: 4 × 515 MW
- Nameplate capacity: 2086 MW
- Capacity factor: 73.85% (lifetime); 87.07% (2019)
- Annual net output: 23,600 GW·h (2019); 993,673 GW·h (lifetime)

External links
- Website: Pickering Nuclear
- Commons: Related media on Commons

Pickering Nuclear Generating Station is a Canadian nuclear power station currently undergoing a multi-year refurbishment located on the north shore of Lake Ontario in Pickering, Ontario. It is one of the oldest nuclear power stations in the world and Canada's third-largest, with eight CANDU reactors. Of these, the four reactors that formed Pickering A have since been permanently placed out of service, with Units 2 and 3 being shut down in 2003, and Units 1 and 4 retired in 2024. Since the end of September 2026, the remaining four reactors (Units 5 through 8) have been in the process of a full refurbishment, scheduled to be completed in the mid-2030s.

A single 1.8 MWe wind turbine, named the OPG 7 commemorative turbine, was installed on the site of the generating station until October 2019, when it was dismantled.

== Reactor codification ==
The reactors can be classified as follows:

PICKERING A

- PICKERING A 1 (Safe Shutdown state)
- PICKERING A 2 (Safe Shutdown state, defuelled)
- PICKERING A 3 (Safe Shutdown state, defuelled)
- PICKERING A 4 (Safe Shutdown state)

PICKERING B

- PICKERING B 5 (Undergoing refurbishment)
- PICKERING B 6 (Undergoing refurbishment)
- PICKERING B 7 (Undergoing refurbishment)
- PICKERING B 8 (Undergoing refurbishment)

== Construction ==
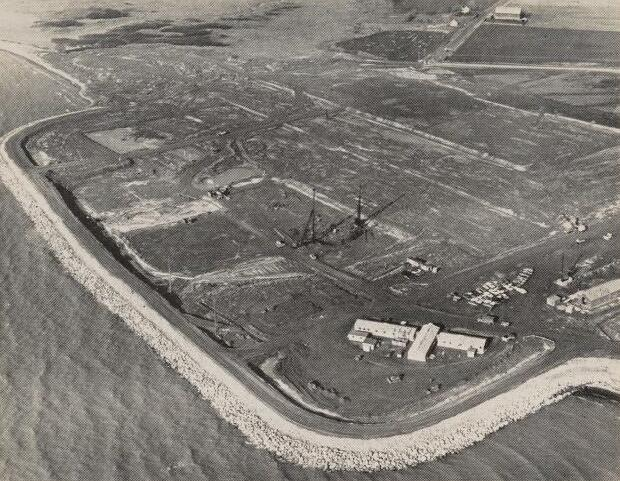
Site of the Pickering Nuclear Station during construction, 1965.

The site was once Squires Beach located west of Duffins Creek. The facility was constructed in stages between 1965 and 1986 by the provincial Crown corporation, Ontario Hydro, with significant completion of Station A scheduled for 1971. In April 1999, Ontario Hydro was split into five component Crown corporations with Ontario Power Generation (OPG) taking over all electricity generating stations. OPG continues to operate the Pickering station.

== Operation ==
The Pickering station is a large multi-unit nuclear facility, comprising four operating CANDU nuclear reactors with a total output of 2,064 MW when all units are on line, and four non-operating units with a total output of 2,060 MW currently shut down in safe storage. The facility is connected to the North American power grid via numerous 230 kV and 500 kV transmission lines.

The facility was operated as two distinct stations, Pickering A (Units 1 to 4) and Pickering B (Units 5 to 8) until 2011. While primarily administrative in nature, the division was not wholly artificial, as there are some distinct differences in design between the two groups of stations. (Example: The Pickering A units employ a moderator dump as a shutdown mechanism, a feature not found in Pickering B, which instead uses what is called an over-poisoned reaction guaranteed shutdown.) There are, however, a number of systems and structures in common between the two stations; the most notable of these is the shared vacuum building, a negative pressure containment system. The operation of Pickering A and B was unified in 2010, to reduce costs when Pickering A Units 2 and 3 were shut down and placed in safe storage.

== Partial shutdown ==
On December 31, 1997, the four Pickering A reactors, along with the remaining three units at Bruce A, were shut down by Ontario Hydro for safety reasons and placed in lay-up. Specific to Pickering A, four years earlier the AECB had required mandatory upgrades to the safe shutdown system be completed by the end of 1997, which differed from that at the other three plants. Pickering A featured a moderator dump as its 2nd shutdown system, and this was deemed too slow compared to the poison injection system that later plants used, including Pickering B. Ontario Hydro committed to the refit and restart project, but it underwent long delays and large cost over-runs.

=== Safety system refit ===
Often called a refurbishment, the return to service of Pickering A units 1 and 4 did not involve refurbishing the reactor cores, which involves replacing the calandria tubes, pressure tubes, feeders and end fittings. The main scope of work was the upgrading of the secondary safe shutdown system as well as some maintenance. Instead of retrofitting the poison injection found at the other plants, the least cost option was to add more shutdown rods and then split them into separate, independent groups. This was deemed sufficient by the AECB, despite acknowledging that this does not in fact constitute a fully independent fast acting secondary safe shutdown system.

=== Return to service ===
Premier Mike Harris asked former federal energy Minister Jake Epp to study and make recommendations on the problems with the Pickering restart. The review panel was established in May 2003.

Unit 4 was refitted and then restarted in September 2003. The election of the Ontario Liberal Party in October 2003 delayed action on the Epp report. In late 2003, the new government fired the top three executives of OPG for the Unit 4 restoration, which was years late and millions of dollars over budget.

Mr. Epp and the Pickering A Review Panel released their report in December 2003, which acknowledged the large cost over-runs and delays, attributing blame to bad management. The Epp Review estimated the cost of restarting the remaining three reactors at $3 – 4 billion and supported the continuation of the project.

The government of Dalton McGuinty appointed Epp to the Ontario Power Generation Review headed by John Manley to examine the future role of Ontario Power Generation (OPG) in the province's electricity market, examine its corporate and management structure, and decide whether the public utility should proceed with refurbishing three more nuclear reactors at the Pickering nuclear power plant. The report recommended proceeding with the restart of Pickering “A” reactors 1, 2, and 3, sequentially. The report argued that the restart of units 2 and 3 would be contingent on whether “OPG will be able to succeed at the Unit 1 project."

The McGuinty government accepted the OPG Review Committee's recommendation and allowed the refit and restart of reactor 1.

The anti-nuclear group Sierra Club of Canada criticized the 2004 OPG Review Committee report for not attributing any blame to the problems of nuclear technology, noting that there were no energy or environmental experts appointed to the panel.

Numerous changes in executive-level staff and project management strategy were made for the follow-on project to refit Unit 1. The experience with the return to service of Pickering A Unit 1 was significantly different from Unit 4, with a much tighter adherence to schedule and budget. In August 2005, the OPG Board of Directors announced that Units 2 and 3 would not be returned to service due to specific technical and cost risks surrounding the material condition of these two units. Unit 1 was returned to service in November 2005.

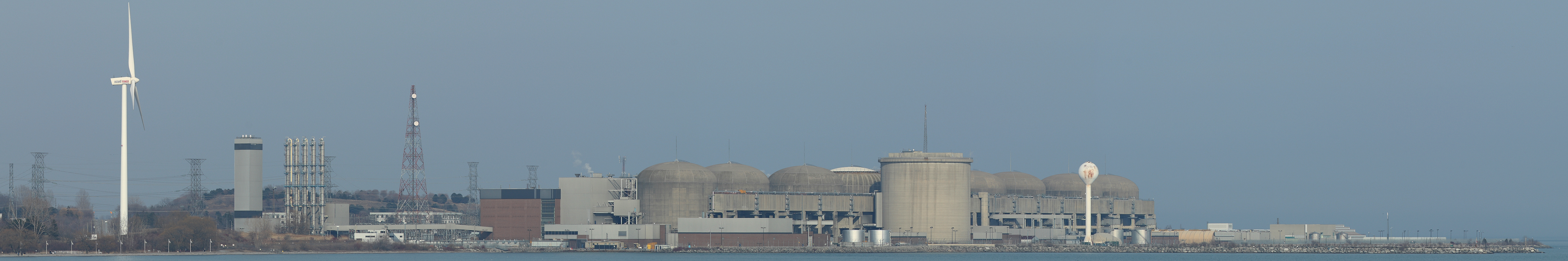
The Pickering Nuclear Generating Station, viewed from the west. All eight reactors are visible, from 2.5km to 3.25km away.

== Electrical output ==
The graph represents the annual electricity generation at the site (A and B combined) in GWh.

As of the end of 2025, the total lifetime output of the facility was 1,010,188 GWh.

== Costs ==
=== Construction costs ===
Ontario Hydro estimated the construction cost for the four Pickering "A" units at $508 million in 1965. Actual cost was $716 million (1973 dollars). Adjusted for inflation, the $508 million estimate in 1973 dollars is $698 million, a 2.6% overrun.

The 1974 estimated cost for the four Pickering "B" units was $1.585 billion. Final cost was $3.846 billion (1986 dollars). Adjusted for inflation, the $1.585 billion estimate in 1986 dollars is $4.082 billion, putting Pickering B under budget.

=== Safety refit costs ===
According to Ontario's FAO, the cost for refitting and restarting the Pickering A units deviated significantly from projections.
- Pickering Unit 4 was slated to cost $460 million and ultimately ended up costing $1.25 billion.
- Pickering Unit 1 was slated to cost $210 million and ultimately ended up costing $1.00 billion.

However, the figure presented by the FAO for Unit 1 doesn't align with that provided by Ontario Energy Minister, Dwight Duncan, who indicated that Pickering Unit 1 would cost $900 million, putting the completed project much closer to budget. This is supported by OPG stating that the project was completed on time and on budget.

== Waste ==
The used nuclear fuel and some refurbishment waste generated by the plant sits on-site at the Pickering Waste Management Facility. All operational low and intermediate-level waste is transported to OPG's Western Waste Management Facility at the Bruce nuclear site near Kincardine, Ontario. OPG has proposed the construction and operation of a deep geologic repository for the long-term storage of low and intermediate level waste on lands adjacent to the Western Waste Management Facility. The Nuclear Waste Management Organization is currently seeking a site for a potential repository for the used fuel from all Canadian nuclear reactors.

== Records ==
- On October 7, 1994, Pickering Unit 7 set the world record for continuous runtime at 894 days, a record that stood for 22 years. It was surpassed by Heysham 2 unit 8 in 2016, a facility located in the UK, owned by EDF. This was subsequently surpassed by OPG's Darlington plant with Unit 1 running 1,106 consecutive days.
- In 2019, Pickering set a site capacity factor record of 87.07%, producing 23.6TWh and putting it roughly on-par with the much newer Darlington and Bruce facilities.
- On May 19, 2025, the Pickering B units pushed the lifetime production of the Pickering facility over the 1PWh threshold. It joins Bruce in having reached this milestone.

== Future ==
In January 2016, the Province of Ontario approved plans to pursue continued operation of the Pickering Nuclear Generating Station to 2024. The extension was intended to ensure sufficient base load electricity was available during refurbishment of the Darlington Nuclear Generating Station and the initial Bruce Nuclear refurbishments. By 2016, OPG had begun planning for the end of commercial operations at the generating station, including the potential repurposing of the Pickering site location.

OPG will begin the longer term decommissioning process if refurbishment is not pursued. The first step in the long-term decommissioning process is to layup the reactors and place them into safe storage. Pickering staff will have future employment opportunities placing the Pickering units in a safe storage state, at the Darlington refurbishment and operations, or at the potential new build at Darlington.

In September 2022, the Province of Ontario announced that it supported an extension of Pickering's operation from 2024 to 2026. Simultaneously, it announced that it had requested OPG to update feasibility studies on the potential refurbishment of the four units of Pickering B. In its announcement, the Province stated that continued operation of the station would reduce carbon dioxide emissions by 2.1 megatonnes in 2026, as well as increasing the North American supply of cobalt-60, a medical isotope.

In August 2023, the OPG Board of Directors agreed with and authorized the submission of the feasibility assessment for the refurbishment of the Pickering B plant to the province as well as to proceed with preliminary planning and preparation activities for the project. This feasibility report was given to the Minister of Energy in January 2024 but was not released to the public because it could harm the "economic or other interests of Ontario.”

On January 30, 2024, the Minister of Energy, Todd Smith, announced that the Government of Ontario would be investing in the refurbishment of the four Pickering B reactors that date back to the early 1980s. The refurbishment is expected to be complete by the mid 2030s and should extend the life of the plant by at least another 30 years.

On October 1, 2024, at 11 pm, Pickering 1 was removed from service as planned, as part of the A plant shutdown process. On December 31, 2024, at 12 pm, Pickering 4 was removed from service, the final step in the A plant shutdown process.

In September 2026, the four units of Pickering B were removed from service in preparation for their refurbishment. The project will include the replacement of all 1520 fuel channel assemblies and 48 boilers, upgrades to the turbines and generators that will add 30 MW of nameplate capacity to each unit, and improvements to auxiliary systems around the plant. Addtionally, a new 1.5 km long deep-water intake tunnel will be constructed to upgrade the station's cooling system. All four units are due to return to service by the mid-2030s.

== Incidents ==
A serious incident occurred on August 1, 1983. Pressure tube G16 in the Pickering A Unit 2 reactor developed a 2-metre-long split. The reactor was safely shut down and the damage investigated. The cause was found to be the mis-location of annulus gas spacer springs which allowed the hot pressure tube to sag and touch the inside of the cold calandria tube leading to hydrogen enrichment of the cooler areas. This created a series of small cracks which linked up and caused the long rupture. There was some local fuel damage and the reactor was safely shut down by the operators with no increase in radioactive emissions. The eventual resolution was Large Scale Fuel Channel Replacement and all the pressure tubes were replaced in all Pickering A reactors. The new pressure tubes were supported by an improved design of the annulus gas spacer springs. Since then, careful monitoring of the location of the annulus gas spacer rings has been a significant part of routine reactor inspections.

On December 10, 1994, there was a loss of coolant accident. It is said to be the most serious accident in Canadian history (June 2001) by The Standing Senate Committee on Energy, the Environment and Natural Resources. The Emergency Core Cooling System was used to prevent a meltdown.

In 1995 and 1996, the AECB noted many safety concerns with the plant, and the generating station was shut in 1997 after peer reviews describing poor safety practices at the plant became public. An Independent, Integrated Performance Assessment report noted that Pickering stations A and B were cited for breaking regulation 15 times and having 13 fires for the year. "Also of concern was the high failure rate of persons being tested for positions as nuclear operators. At Pickering A only 65% of those taking the test passed, while at Pickering B the rate was just 56%."

On March 14, 2011, there was a leak of 73 cubic metres of demineralized water into Lake Ontario from a failed pump seal. There was negligible risk to the public according to the Canadian Nuclear Safety Commission.

=== 2020 nuclear incident alert ===
On January 12, 2020, at 7:24 a.m. ET, an emergency alert was issued via Alert Ready on all radio stations, television stations, television providers, and wireless networks in the province of Ontario, containing an advisory of an unspecified "incident" that had been reported and was being addressed at the plant. The alert stated that no immediate action was required for those within 10 kilometres (6.2 mi) of the plant. Approximately 40 minutes later, OPG issued a statement via Twitter that the alert had been sent in error, and a second emergency alert was issued at around 9:10 a.m. with a similar message cancelling the previous alert.

Solicitor General Sylvia Jones stated that the alert was accidentally issued during a "routine training exercise" by Ontario's emergency operations centre. The incident prompted criticism from government officials, including MPP Peter Tabuns, Pickering mayor Dave Ryan, and Toronto mayor John Tory.

The false alarm also prompted renewed interest in preparedness for actual nuclear accidents: OPG reported a surge in the sales of potassium iodide kits via its "Prepare to Be Safe" website between January 12 and 13, increasing from its monthly average of 100–200 to over 32,000. The website is applicable for those who live within 50 kilometres (31 mi) of the plant; per Canadian Nuclear Safety Commission (CNSC) requirements, OPG is required to distribute these pills to all residences within 10 kilometres (6.2 mi) of a nuclear facility.

== See also ==
- List of largest power stations in Canada
- List of commercial nuclear reactors in Canada
- Nuclear power in Canada
- Darlington Nuclear Generating Station
- Bruce Nuclear Generating Station
- Point Lepreau Nuclear Generating Station
- Fitzpatrick Nuclear Generating Station
- Nine Mile Point Nuclear Generating Station
- Frenchman's Bay
