= Bruce Nuclear Generating Station =

Nuclear power station in Ontario, Canada. Largest nuclear power station in Canada

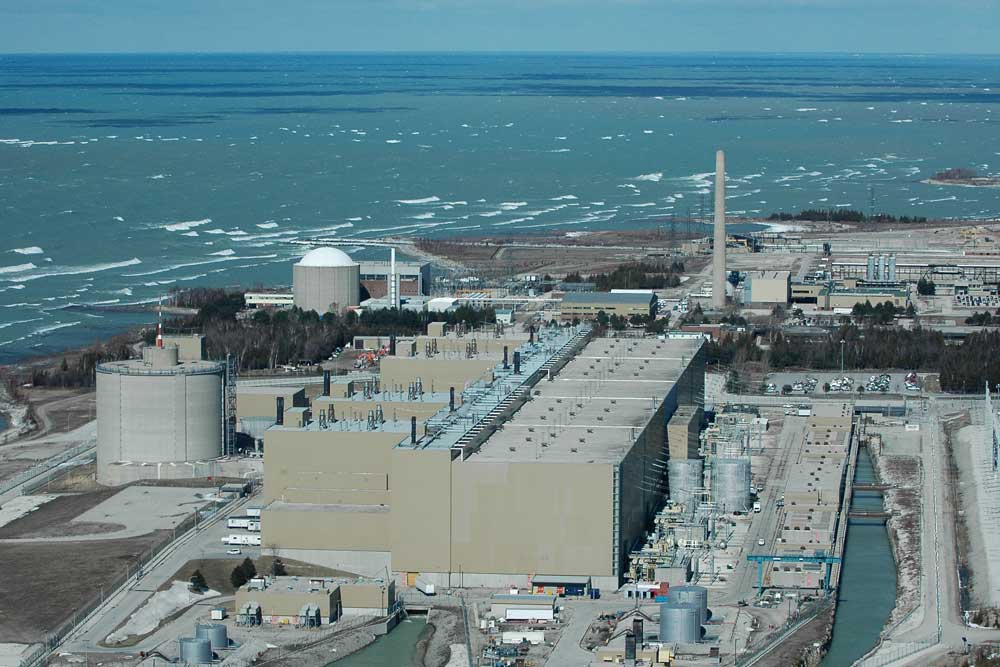
- Bruce B Nuclear Generating Station
- Country: Canada
- Location: Kincardine, Bruce County, Ontario
- Coordinates: 44°19′31″N 81°35′58″W
- Status: Operational
- Construction began: Unit 1: 1 June 1971; Unit 2: 1 December 1970; Unit 3: 1 July 1972; Unit 4: 1 September 1972; Unit 5: 1 June 1978; Unit 6: 1 January 1978; Unit 7: 1 May 1979; Unit 8: 1 August 1979
- Commission date: Unit 1: 1 September 1977; Unit 2: 1 September 1977; Unit 3: 1 February 1978; Unit 4: 18 January 1979; Unit 5: 1 March 1985; Unit 6: 14 September 1984; Unit 7: 10 April 1986; Unit 8: 22 May 1987
- Construction cost: $1.8 billion CAD (A station) $6 billion CAD (B station)
- Owner: Ontario Power Generation (OPG)
- Operator: Bruce Power

Nuclear power station
- Reactor type: CANDU PHWR
- Reactor supplier: AECL
- Cooling source: Lake Huron
- Thermal capacity: 4 × 2832 MW_{th} (A 1–4); 4 × 2832 MW_{th} (B 5–8)

Power generation
- Units operational: 1 × 823 MWe (NET A1); 1 × 828 MWe (NET A2); 1 × 816 MWe (NET A3); 1 × 806 MWe (NET A4); 1 × 822 MWe (NET B5); 1 × 817 MWe (NET B6); 1 × 825 MWe (NET B7); 1 × 817 MWe (NET B8)
- Make and model: CANDU 791 (A 1–2); CANDU 750A (A 3–4); CANDU 750B (B 5–8)
- Units decommissioned: 1 × 220 MW (Douglas Point)
- Nameplate capacity: 6,550MW
- Capacity factor: 87.4% (2014–2018); 79.46% (lifetime)
- Annual net output: 48,169 GWh (2018); 1,692,499 GWh (lifetime)

External links
- Website: www.brucepower.com
- Commons: Related media on Commons

Bruce Nuclear Generating Station is a nuclear power station located on the eastern shore of Lake Huron in Ontario, Canada. It occupies 932 ha (2300 acres) of land. The facility derives its name from Bruce Township, the local municipality when the plant was constructed, now Kincardine due to amalgamation. With eight CANDU pressurized heavy-water reactors, until 2016, it was the world's largest fully operational nuclear generating station by total reactor count and the number of currently operational reactors. In 2016, it was exceeded in nameplate capacity by South Korea's Kori Nuclear Power Plant. The station is the largest employer in Bruce County, with over 4000 workers.

Formerly known as the Bruce Nuclear Power Development (BNPD), the facility was constructed in stages between 1970 and 1987 by the provincial Crown corporation, Ontario Hydro. In April 1999 Ontario Hydro was split into 5 component Crown corporations with Ontario Power Generation (OPG) taking over all electrical generating stations. In June 2000, OPG entered into a long-term lease agreement with private sector consortium Bruce Power to take over operation. In May 2001, Bruce Power began operations. The lease was for 18 years until 2019 with an option to extend another 25 years to 2044.

In November 2009, the Canadian Nuclear Safety Commission (CNSC) renewed Bruce Power's operating licences for 5 years until 2014 and gave permission to refuel units 1 and 2. In May 2014, the CNSC extended the licence to May 2015 and public hearings were scheduled for early 2015 in Ottawa and Kincardine. A new operating licence was granted for 1 June 2015, until 31 May 2020 and was renewed again from 1 October 2018 until 30 September 2028.

In 2023, it was announced that the site could potentially open a third nuclear power station. Bruce C was first proposed in the late 2000s, however it was not proceeded with at the time.

In 2023, the Bruce generating station produced more than 45 TWh of electrical power, about 7% of the total Canadian electricity consumption.

== Description ==
The power plant comprises eight CANDU pressurized heavy-water reactors arranged into two plants (A and B) with four reactors each. Each reactor stands within a reinforced concrete containment. The steam generators are 12 m tall, and weigh 100 tonnes each. Each plant uses three fueling machines, shared between the four reactors, which travel in a duct cut through solid rock beneath the reactors, traversing the entire plant. The duct doubles as part of the pressure relief system, connected to the vacuum building. Each reactor has its own turbine generator set, with one high-pressure turbine and three low-pressure turbines driving one generator. The turbine hall is about 400 m long at each plant and houses the four turbine generator sets. Cooling water is taken from Lake Huron. There is (originally) one control room per 4 reactors.

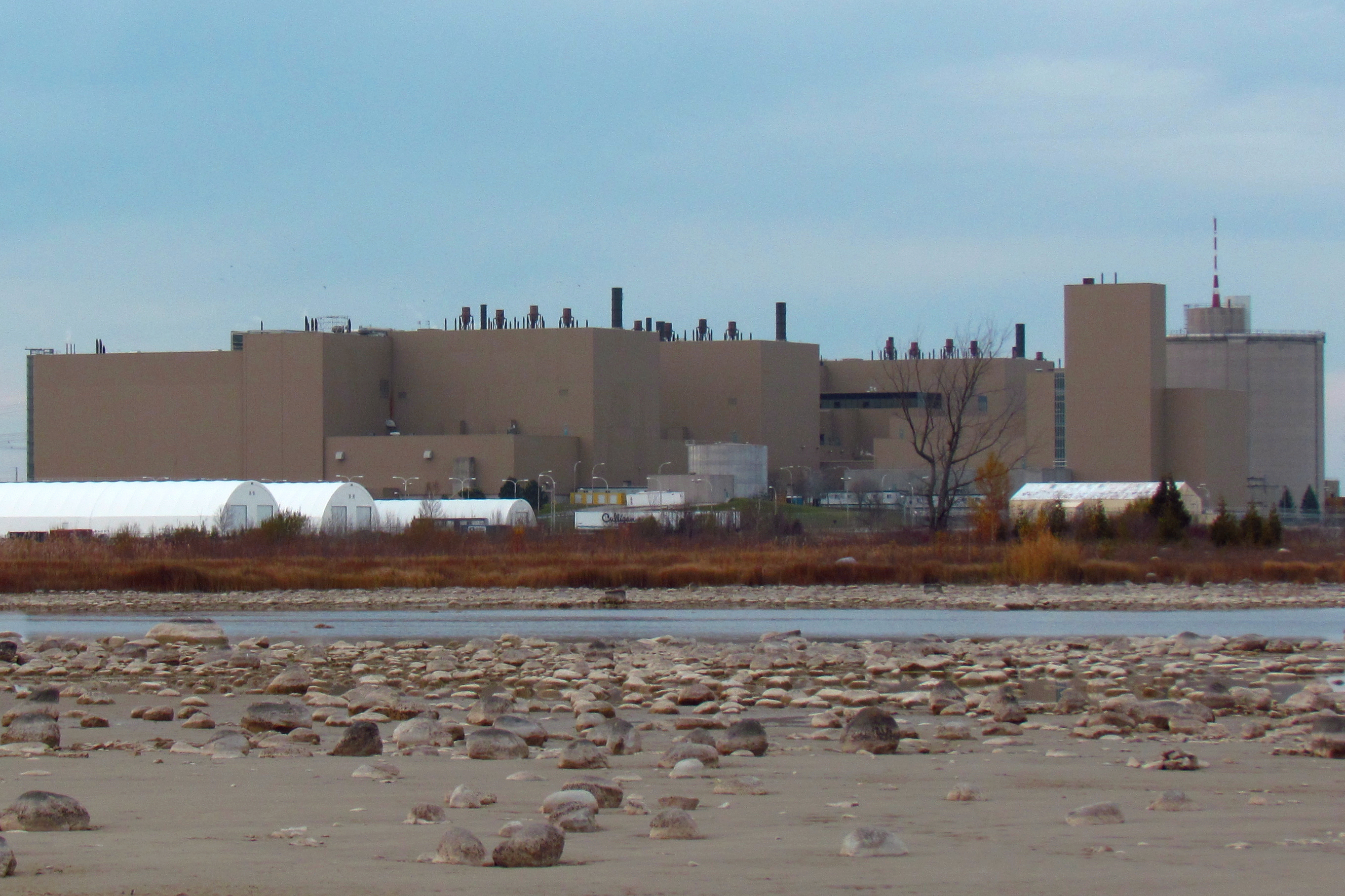
Bruce A, from across Baie Du Dor

=== Bruce A ===
Construction of Bruce A began in 1969, making it the successor to the Pickering A plant. Bruce A units were originally rated at 750 MWe net / 805 MWe gross, which was later increased to 769 MWe net / 825 MWe gross. As of 2017 the Bruce A units were capable of producing up to 779 MWe net according to IESO generator data. Each reactor requires 6240 fuel bundles that weigh 22.5 kg each, or about 140 tonnes of fuel. There are 480 fuel channels per reactor, containing 13 bundles each. There is storage capacity for about 23,000 bundles. Approximately 18 bundles are discharged per reactor per day.

The original Bruce A steam generators utilized a separate large horizontal shared steam drum (with one steam drum common to four steam generators), a design dropped in most other plants at the time. Issues related to the AECL requested design of the tube supports caused repair and delay costs, which exceeded the net worth of the builder Babcock & Wilcox Canada.

Until they were removed in 1998, Bruce A reactors used unique booster rods to control reactivity. Booster rods contained 93% uranium-235, and were inserted to overcome reactor poisoning. Bruce B and all other Ontario Hydro reactors instead use absorber rods called "adjusters" which are normally inserted and are removed to overcome xenon poisoning.

Bruce A demonstrated an "excellent" early operating history. Together with Pickering A, the eight units achieved an overall average capability factor of 83% over the initial five-year period. However, by 2001, when Bruce Power took the lease, all Bruce A units were laid-up.

In 1981, Unit 1 was ranked the top reactor in the world with a 97% availability factor. In December 1997, after about 20 years of operation, it was out of service. In 2005 (after 7 years of being idle) refurbishment started. In September 2012 (15 years out of service) it resumed operation.

In 1982, Unit 2 was temporarily shut down due to a pressure-tube leak. In 1986, a fuel channel failed while the reactor was shut down; some of the fuel elements were swept into the moderator (calandria) and were difficult to remove.

In 1986, maintenance workers accidentally left a protective lead blanket in the steam generator of Unit 2. By the time the mistake was discovered six years later, the blanket had melted, severely damaging the boiler. In October 1995, after about 18 years of operation, unit 2 was taken out of service. In 2005 (after 9 years of being idle) refurbishment started. In October 2012, it resumed operation.

In 1982, Unit 3 set a then world record of 494 days of continuous operation and as of 1984 Bruce A was the most reliable multi-unit station in the world. From April 1998 onward, Bruce A3 remained idle for 6 years, returning to service in January 2004 (at which time the unit was 32 years old). Refurbishment in unit 3 began in March 2023, with the plan being to return to service in 2026. Unit 3 was returned to service on June 8, 2026, 7 months ahead of schedule.

In 1990, a software error in unit 4 caused a fueling-machine error, damaging a fuel channel. In 1993, reactor power was reduced to 60% until various loss-of-coolant accident (LOCA) scenarios could be addressed. Subsequently, Bruce A units returned to 89% of rated power. In March 1998, after about 19 years of operation, unit 4 was taken out of service. It returned to service in October 2003, after 6 years of being idle (at which time the unit was 31 years old). Planned refurbishment of unit 4 to begin in 2025 (when the unit will be 53 years old).

=== Bruce B ===
Bruce B units, located to the south of Bruce A, are of a slightly larger capacity: 817 MW net, 840 MW gross, which is attributed to an improved steam generator design, where the steam drum is integral to each steam generator in a "light bulb" arrangement, eliminating the horizontal cross-drum. In 1990, a nine-week "impairment" of Bruce B was created when a technician incorrectly set the calibration on radioactivity monitors. In 2007, Bruce B 7 was the top performing nuclear reactor in Ontario with 97.2% performance. and in 2009, Bruce B 5 was first with 95.4% performance.

Bruce B 5

- Construction began 1 June 1978.
- On 15 November 1984 it reached first criticality.
- Commercial operation began on 1 March 1985.
- Originally scheduled to be shut down in 2016 (unit would have been 31 years old).
- Planned refurbishment to begin in 2026 (unit will be 41 years old).

Bruce B 6

- Construction began 1 January 1978.
- On 29 May 1984 it reached first criticality.
- Commercial operation began on 14 September 1984.
- Originally scheduled to be shut down in 2018 (unit would have been 34 years old).
- Refurbishment began in January 2020 (unit was 36 years old). Return to service took place on September 14, 2023.

Bruce B 7

- Construction began 1 May 1979.
- On 7 January 1986 it reached first criticality.
- Commercial operation began on 10 April 1986.
- Originally scheduled to be shut down in 2015 (unit would have been 29 years old).
- Planned refurbishment to begin in 2028 (unit will be 42 years old).

Bruce B 8

- Construction began 1 August 1979.
- On 15 February 1987 it reached first criticality.
- Commercial operation began on 22 May 1987.
- Originally scheduled to be shut down in 2019 (unit would have been 32 years old).
- Planned refurbishment to begin in 2030 (unit will be 43 years old).

=== Electrical output ===
The graph represents the annual electricity generation at the site (A and B combined) in GWh. In 2023, it was about 28% of Ontario's production.

As of the end of 2025, the total lifetime output of the facility was 1,692,499 GWh.

==== Notable Achievements ====
In 2009 total site output hit 1,002 TWh, making it the first nuclear power plant in the world to produce 1 PWh (1,000 TWh). Gravelines in France achieved the same in 2010.

As of the end of 2020, the 8 Bruce units had produced a combined total of 1,479.59 TWh.

After Units 1–2 completed refurbishment activities and were brought back online in 2012, Bruce became the largest operating nuclear generation facility in the world by both the number of currently operational reactors and total net output capacity, having a total of 8 operational CANDU nuclear reactors with a combined output of 6,384 MW_{e} net (7,276 MW_{e} gross) when all units are online, surpassed now by two South-Korean plants: Kori NPP since 2019 and Hanul NPP since 2022. The Kashiwazaki-Kariwa Nuclear Power Plant in Japan had a larger total output capacity, but it has been out of service since 2011.

=== Transmission Lines ===
As of 2008, the Bruce station had three double-circuit 500 kV transmission lines to feed the major load centres in southern Ontario, in addition to three double-circuit 230 kV lines serving the local area. These circuits are connected via two high voltage switchyards owned and operated by Hydro One.

In 2006, OPA had proposed increasing transmission line capacity, at a cost of between $200–600 million, described as "the largest electricity transmission investment in Ontario in the last 20 years". The line was completed in June 2012, several months ahead of schedule, with over 700 towers built for the 180 kilometre line to Milton. The project ranked 45th in Renew Canada's annual list.

=== Comparison with Pickering ===
Compared to the other major Canadian nuclear power plant built earlier, Pickering station, the Bruce reactors have higher power output, achieved by: increasing the number of fuel channels, increasing the number of bundles per channel, and a change in the fuel bundle itself.

At Bruce, the fuelling equipment is shared by the four reactors of each plant, while at Pickering each reactor had a fuelling machine. The Bruce fuelling machine and fuel channel end fitting design (mostly by Canadian General Electric) is based on the Nuclear Power Demonstration design. The Pickering design by AECL was based on Douglas Point.

The building design of the reactor differs: Bruce uses a squarish "close-in" design, in which as much of the equipment as possible is arranged outside the main containment envelope for easier access during maintenance and emergencies. The steam generators penetrate the containment. The primary coolant pumps and primary piping systems are inside the containment enclosure, but the pump motors are outside containment and the drive shaft seals form the containment boundary. Pickering has round domes which enclose much of the secondary cooling equipment.

- The Pickering A system did not originally have a second independent shutdown system. The Bruce containment concept differs: the reactor's reactivity mechanism deck serves as a part of the containment boundary, is closer to the reactor, and more prone to damage in the event of an accident ("accidental physical disassembly"). The designers therefore foresaw the need for a second safety system to reduce the risk of an accident. Bruce received a second, fully independent Safety Shutdown System (SDS2) which uses a liquid neutron poison injection method.
- The Bruce system also has a high-pressure Emergency Coolant Injection System (ECIS).
- Each Bruce "4 pack" has its own Vacuum Building, while Pickering has one per eight reactors.
- At Pickering, the vacuum duct was closed by nonreturn valves, to prevent flow of the steam/air mixture from the duct to a non-accident reactor unit following a LOCA. In the Bruce concept, there is no such non-return valve; the reactor buildings are all interconnected during normal operation.
- Bruce uses single-circuit heat transport system, while Pickering had two circuits.
- The first two reactor units of Pickering A originally used Zircaloy-2 pressure tubes. All subsequent CANDU units use a zirconium – 2.5% niobium alloy.
- Bruce uses a pressurizer to maintain coolant pressure, Pickering a different system.
- The Pickering design utilized 12 small steam generators operated in groups of three which can be individually valved out of the heat transport loop, as can the 16 pumps per reactor, with 4 being spare. At Bruce, the number of steam generators and coolant pumps was reduced to 8 and 4 respectively, without any spare pumps, thereby simplifying the piping. The Bruce system permits reactor power level to be adjusted more quickly and easily.

=== Construction costs ===
Bruce A was projected to cost CA$0.9 billion in 1969. Actual cost was $1.8 billion (in 1979 dollars). Adjusted for inflation, the $930 million estimate in 1979 dollars is $1.88 billion, putting Bruce A under budget.

Bruce B was projected to cost $3.929 billion in 1976. Actual cost was $5.994 billion (in 1987 dollars). Adjusted for inflation, the $3.929 billion estimate in 1987 dollars is $8.667 billion, putting Bruce B under budget.

=== Cost of generated electricity ===
In 2010, Bruce Power was paid approximately $60 million for contracted, but unused power.

On 1 January 2016, Bruce Power began receiving a single contracted price for all output from the site of CA$65.73 per megawatt-hour (MWh). This price is partially adjusted annually to account for inflation and wage growth, with additional monthly fuel cost adjustments, and it includes a small payment for Bruce's unique ability to curtail up to 2400 MW of generation (total across all eight units – up to 300 MW per individual unit) via steam bypass operation during periods of surplus generation.

During the course of the refurbishment of Units 3–6, the price will be raised in steps to cover individual reactor refurbishment costs, with each increase starting 12 months prior to the start of each individual refurbishment. Each increase will last only until that unit's refurbishment costs, which are fixed prior to refurbishment start, have been recovered. The average price per MWh that will be paid to Bruce Power for all electricity generated from 2016 to 2064 (covering the entire refurbishment period for Units 3–6 plus the entire expected remaining post-refurbishment lifetimes of all eight Bruce Power reactors (including the two that were already refurbished) was estimated to be approximately CA$80.6/MWh in 2017 dollars by the Financial Accountability Office of Ontario. In contrast, the estimated average price of nuclear electricity from all three Ontario nuclear plants during that same 2016–2064 period was estimated to be CA$80.7/MWh in 2017 dollars, the 2017–2018 unit cost of Ontario nuclear power was CA$69/MWh, and the current price of electricity for "most residential and small business customers" was CA$114.9/MWh (prior to the Fair Hydro Plan) or CA$97.6 (after the Fair Hydro Plan).

=== Blackout of 2003 ===
During the Northeast Blackout of 2003 three Bruce B units continued running at 60% reactor power and 0% grid electrical power. They were able to do so for hours, because they had steam bypass systems designed to de-couple the reactor output from the generator electrical output. The three units were reconnected to the grid within 5 hours. Bruce A and B stations were designed to operate indefinitely while disconnected from the grid.

"Contrary to popular belief, the electrical generators of nuclear plants can follow the load demands of the electrical grid provided specific engineered systems to permit this mode of operation are included in the plant design."

=== Cobalt-60 production ===
Cobalt-60 (^{60}Co) can be produced in a CANDU reactor by using adjuster rods made primarily out of ^{59}Co (instead of the normal stainless steel), which is slowly transmuted into ^{60}Co via neutron activation (^{59}Co + n → ^{60}Co). These now-intensely-radioactive cobalt-60 adjuster rods are then "harvested" (removed and replaced with fresh ^{59}Co adjuster rods) after one to three years of use in the reactor during a routine reactor shutdown, and are later processed into sealed ^{60}Co sources of varying intensities by Nordion. The Bruce nuclear power plant has been producing ^{60}Co since the 1980s, and almost all of the world's supply of ^{60}Co comes from various CANDU nuclear reactors, with Bruce being the single largest supplier. As of 2007, Bruce supplied over 40% of the world's ^{60}Co. This rose to over 50% by 2016, with Pickering supplying approximately another 20% of global demand. In 2016, Bruce extended their contract with Nordion for the continued supply of ^{60}Co to cover the entire projected post-refurbishment life of the Bruce reactors, which are expected to operate until 2064.

Bruce also began producing High Specific Activity (HSA) ^{60}Co in 2016, which is designed for highly specialized medical uses such as cancer treatment and had been primarily produced at the NRU reactor for the past 60+ years (which was originally scheduled to be shut down in 2016, but will be kept online until 31 March 2018 due to the general worldwide lack of sufficient replacement medical isotope production capacity for several critical isotopes such as molybdenum-99). As the NRU produces over two-thirds of the world's HSA ^{60}Co, Bruce's ability to supply HSA ^{60}Co will become critical to help fill the immense production gap left by the NRU once it is decommissioned in 2018. OPG and Bruce Power are collaborating on an effort to expand ^{60}Co production to the Bruce A and Darlington reactors in order to fully cover Pickering's production (which will end when the plant is decommissioned in 2024) in addition to the inevitable gaps in ^{60}Co production capacity that will be caused by the upcoming refurbishments of six of Bruce's reactors (Units A 3–4 & Units B 5–8), as well as all four of Darlington's reactors. They are also working on expanding the production of HSA ^{60}Co to more reactors.

In 2017, Bruce Power became the first Canadian recipient of a Top Innovative Practice (TIP) award from the Nuclear Energy Institute (NEI) for its ongoing work with Nordion to produce cobalt-60.

==== Radioisotope production project ====
Bruce Power is working with Framatome to develop the capability to "produce shorter half-life radioisotopes (such as molybdenum-99, lutetium-177 and iridium-192)" using Areva's proprietary technology for the on-line production of radioisotopes in heavy water reactors. Areva will design and supply the system for installation in the existing Bruce units.

In June 2018, Bruce Power and ITG (a subsidiary of Isotopen Technologien München (ITM)) announced the start of a joint effort to explore producing lutetium-177 in Bruce's reactors, with ITG planned to manage the development, processing, and distribution of lutetium-177. The initial Isotope Production System (IPS), producing Lu-177, came online in January 2022.

== Refurbishment of Units 1–2, 1995–2012 ==
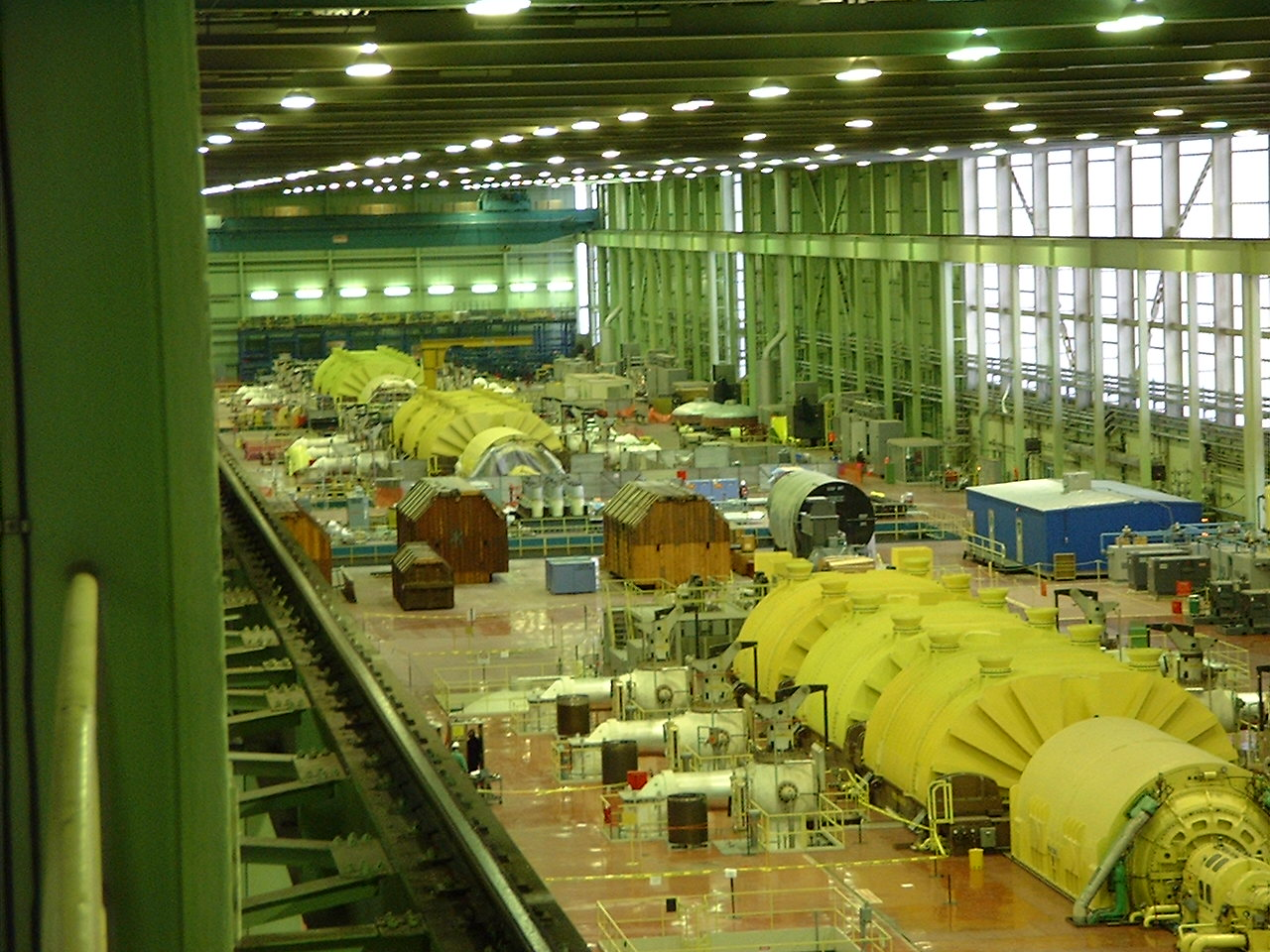
Bruce A Turbine Hall during the 2002–04 restart project

Retubing of Bruce A units was planned in 1992, but deferred, as Ontario Hydro had a surplus of generation at the time.

In late 2005, Bruce Power and the Government of Ontario committed to return units 1 and 2 to service, to help meet increasing energy demand in the province of Ontario. The project was originally estimated to cost $4.25 billion. It was determined that while units 1 & 2 could have been restarted without refurbishment, it was not economically advantageous to do so, since refurbishment would have been soon required. The goal is to keep units 1 & 2 in service until 2043, 66 years after original commissioning.

The refurbishment required pressure tube and calandria tube replacement, steam generator replacement, shutdown System 2 (SDS2) enhancement, an upgrade of turbine control systems, replacing original analog controls with a DCS and significant other work and maintenance (for example, replacement of 30 transformers containing PCBs).

A new fuel bundle design (Low Void Reactivity Fuel, LVRF) was considered, using slightly enriched 1% U-235 fuel pellets, within a CANFLEX 43-element bundle compared to the existing 37-element bundle.

In 2006 and 2007, the restart project was judged to be the largest infrastructure project in Canada by ReNew Canada magazine. In April 2007, the auditor general reviewed the refurbishment deal In August 2007, estimated cost for the project had grown to $5.25 billion when Bruce Power decided to replace all 480 fuel channels in Unit 4, which will extend its working life to 2036, in line with the other 3 units of Bruce A. In 2008, due to difficulties developing the necessary robotics, the estimated cost of restarting Units 1 and 2 rose between $400 and $700 million. As of 2008, the project remained on schedule.

In January 2010, up to 217 workers were potentially exposed to radiation during the refurbishment. 27 workers may have received 5 mSv, a level well below the level that can affect human health. Only one lab in Canada (at Chalk River) was qualified to do the testing. Bruce Power had to seek permission to use alternative labs.

In 2010, a plan to transport decommissioned, low-level radioactive steam generators to Sweden via the Great Lakes caused controversy. The CNSC approved the plan in February 2011.

As of January 2011, fuel channel installation in Unit 2 was complete. The CNSC gave the operator the green light to restart Unit 2 on 16 March 2012. However, the reactor was shut down the next day after a leak was discovered in the moderator system.

In 2011, refurbishment of Unit 1 and 2, scheduled to be complete 2009, was predicted for 2012. In 2011, the cost had totaled $3.8 billion; the final cost was expected to be $4.8 billion. The original 2005 estimate was $2.75 billion.

In September 2012, Unit 1 began generating power again.

On 16 October 2012, Unit 2 was connected to the provincial electricity grid for the first time in 17 years. In 2013, final costs were estimated at $4.8 billion, up from an original estimate of $2.75 billion, and the project ran "far behind" schedule.

== Refurbishment of Units 3–8, 2016–present ==
In October 2013, under the Ontario Long Term Energy Plan (LTEP) 2013, Ontario announced plans to refurbish six reactors at the Bruce plant beginning with Bruce A4 in 2016. Other units would follow at intervals. Bruce Power estimated the cost at about $2 billion per unit, or $12 billion for six. The price of the power from these units was expected to be in the range of ~$60–$70 per MWh.

In 2016, Bruce Power started a $13 billion refurbishment program for "major component replacement on Units 3–8 in 2020, starting in Unit 6". According to Bruce Power, this multi-year plan "will generate between 1,500 and 2,500 jobs on site annually – and 18,000 across Ontario directly and indirectly – while injecting up to $4 billion annually into Ontario's economy".

Renew Canada rated the project as the biggest infrastructure upgrade in Canada for 2017.

- In January 2020, Unit 6 went down for refurbishment. It returned to service on 8 September 2023 when it re-synchronized to the Ontario power grid. It was announced that Bruce 6 had completed its refurbishment ahead of schedule and on-budget.
- In March 2023, Unit 3 went down for refurbishment.
- In February 2025, Unit 4 began refurbishment.

== Waste storage ==
The Bruce station area is the site of OPG's Western Waste Management Facility (WWMF). The WWMF stores the low-level waste and intermediate level nuclear waste from operating its 20 nuclear reactors, including those leased to Bruce Power. As of 2009, there were 11 low level storage buildings.

The WWMF provides dry nuclear fuel storage for the Bruce reactors. The Nuclear Waste Management Organization was mandated in 2002 by the Nuclear Fuel Waste Act to submit a proposal for the long-term management, which was submitted to the Minister of Natural Resources in November 2005 and approved by the government in June 2007. As of May 2017 it is seeking a separate site in Canada for a permanent repository for the used fuel from all of Canada's nuclear reactors.

In 2013, OPG proposed to construct a Deep Geologic Repository (DGR) for long-term storage of low-and-intermediate level waste on lands adjacent to WWMF. The proposed DGR would be about 680 metres below surface.

== Future development ==
In 2007, the Ontario Power Authority had recommended in a plan submitted to the Ontario Energy Board, to build a new nuclear power station consisting of at least two reactors. The leading candidate was AECL's Advanced CANDU Reactor. Since 2008, environmental assessments have been underway both at Bruce and at Ontario Power Generation's Darlington Nuclear Generating Station. In 2009, Bruce Power withdrew its application to the CNSC for the Bruce C plant.

=== New station ===
In July 2023, Ontario Minister of Energy Todd Smith announced an intent to build 4.8 GW of new nuclear on the Bruce site, effectively re-starting the plans for Bruce C. It would be the first large-scale nuclear build in Canada for more than three decades, to prepare for increasing electricity demand in the long term.

=== Upgrades ===
- On 26 October 2016, Bruce Power announced an uprate from 6,384 MWe to 6,400 MWe.
- On 11 July 2019, Bruce Power announced another uprate to the facility, adding 22 MW of output to Unit 3, bringing overall site output to 6,430 MWe.
- The March 2019, Bruce Power Major Component Replacement Project: Economic Impact Analysis indicates a target capacity of 7,000 MWe by mid-2033.
- On 14 October 2021, Bruce Power announced an uprate to 6,550 MWe.
- On 23 March 2022, Bruce Power announced an uprate to Unit 1 to 821 MWe
- On 6 May 2022, Bruce Power announced an uprate to Unit 2 to 823MWe, adding 39MW of capacity to the 784MWe it was producing previously.

== Other features on site ==
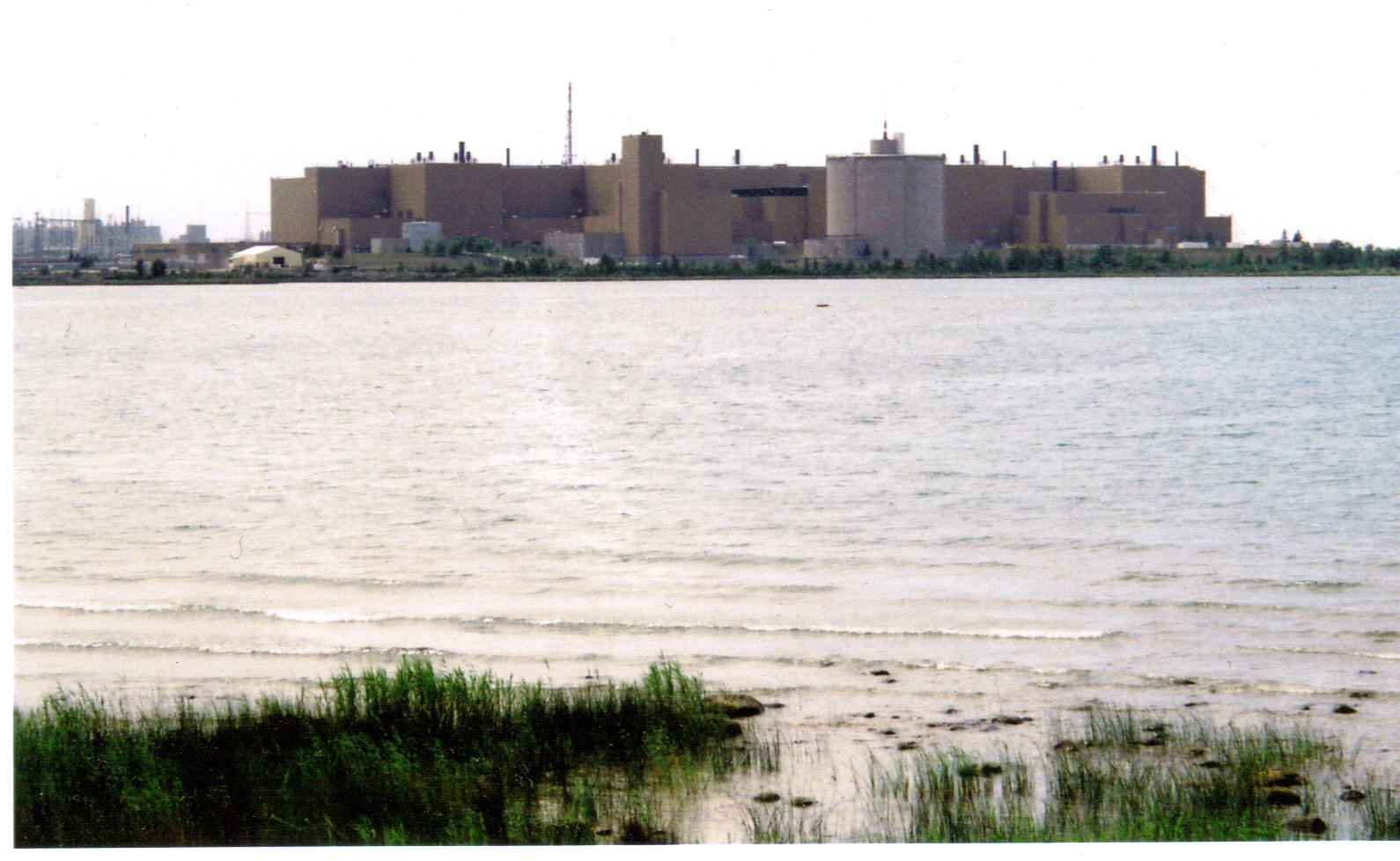
Bruce A looking Southwest across Baie Du Dor

There are more than 56 kilometres of roads on site, and at least 25 major structures. The site has its own fire department, laundry and medical centre.

=== Douglas Point, 1960–1984 ===
Encompassed by the Bruce site is the shut-down Douglas Point reactor, an earlier version of the CANDU design. Construction began in 1960; was operational in 1967; and was shut down in 1984. The present Bruce reactors each are roughly 4 times the capacity of the 200 MW Douglas Point unit.

=== Bruce Heavy Water Plant, 1973–1997 ===
The Bruce Heavy Water Plant (BHWP) also occupied the site. Atomic Energy of Canada Limited contracted the Lummus Company of Canada Limited in 1969 to design and construct the first phase of the plant, while Ontario Hydro was responsible for commissioning and operating.

It was planned to consist of four sub-plants, A through D:

- A was in production in 1973, shutdown in 1984, and demolished in 1993;
- B was in production in 1979, partially shutdown in 1993, completely closed in 1997, and subsequently demolished;
- C was cancelled, and never built;
- D was 70% completed when cancelled, and subsequently demolished in 1995.

During its lifetime, BHWP produced 16,000 tonnes of reactor grade heavy water. Capacity of each sub-plant was planned to be 800 tonnes/annum. The plant size was approximately 960 m by 750 m. The heavy water was 99.75% pure. The production of a single kilogram of heavy water required 340 tonnes of feed water.

=== Bruce Bulk Steam System, 1972–2006 ===
Steam from Bruce A could be diverted to the Bruce Bulk Steam System (BBSS) to provide energy for the production of heavy water (750 MW thermal), to heat buildings within the development (15 MW th), or to provide energy (72 MW th) for the adjacent Bruce Energy Centre (BEC). The BEC supported industries such as greenhouses and plastic manufacturers. As one of the largest bulk steam systems in the world, this system could produce 5,350 MW of medium-pressure process steam, and had over 6 km of piping. It was demolished by the end of 2006. Because of the requirement to provide steam, the Bruce A turbines were undersized relative to the reactor power.

=== Inverhuron Provincial Park, 1950–present ===
OPG owns the nearby 288 ha Inverhuron Provincial Park on Lake Huron, bordering Inverhuron, 14 km north-east of Kincardine, which is not part of the Bruce site proper, and leases it to the Ontario Ministry of Natural Resources. As a condition of the operating licence for Bruce Nuclear, OPG retained a 914 m radius exclusion zone in the northwest corner of the park. After operating over 25 years the park campground was phased out in 1976, because of safety concerns related to the heavy water production. When heavy water was no longer produced, the park campground was allowed to re-open in 2000 on the same spot.

=== Eagles ===
The heated water released back into Lake Huron by the plant prevents the surrounding shoreline from freezing over during winter and attracts an inordinate concentration of lake fish, which in turn attracts droves of bald eagles wintering in the area. Numbers peak around late February to early March and it is not uncommon for visitors to observe several dozen eagles in and around the general vicinity of the plant at any given time during these months.

== Security and safety ==
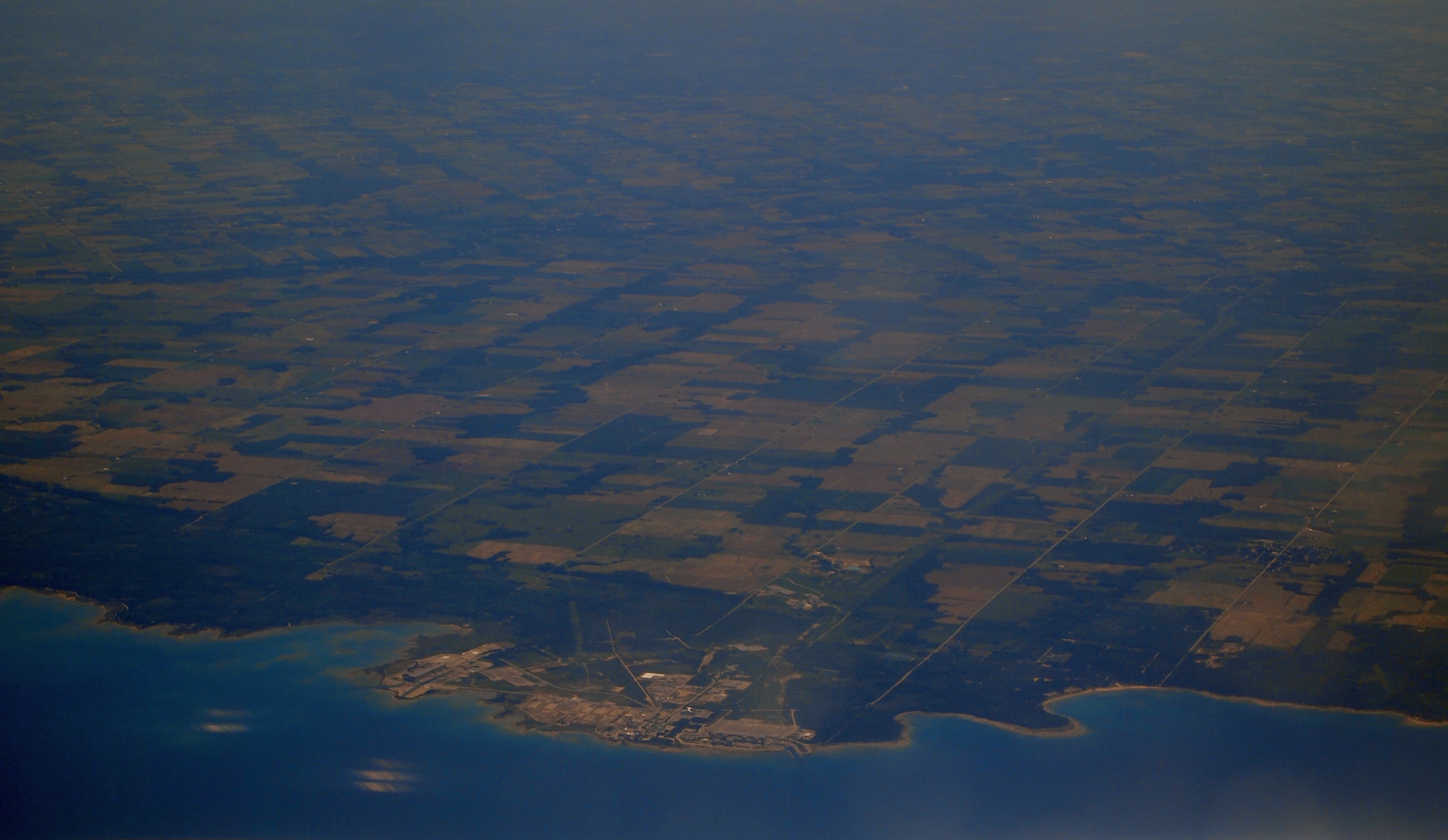
Bruce Power as seen from a passenger aircraft

In 1977, three Greenpeace activists canoed into the site to demonstrate the lack of security.

On 23 September 2001, the plant suffered another PR blow when a man whose boat capsized on Lake Huron near the Bruce complex squeezed through a gate, entered an office building and phoned for help—all undetected.

Before the 2001 September 11 attacks, mandate of the security team was to delay attackers for 17 minutes, until local police could respond. Reliance was on passive measures such as fencing and locks. The "transformed" post-9/11 security team is described as being larger than the police force of the city of Kingston, i.e. equivalent to the force of a city of 100,000. Force members are permitted to carry firearms, and have powers of arrest. The force possesses armoured vehicles, water craft, and the plant is now triple-fenced. In May 2008, the Bruce Nuclear Response Team (NRT) won the U.S. National SWAT Championship (USNSC), defeating 29 other teams from 4 countries, the first time a Canadian team won an international SWAT event. They won again in 2009, 2010, and 2011. After 9/11, tours of the plant area were discontinued, although there is a visitor centre outside of the site.

According to the Bruce County emergency plan, "The Municipality of Kincardine will coordinate the emergency response concerns of a nuclear emergency situation resulting from an accident at the Bruce Power Site in the Municipality of Kincardine". Kincardine is required to maintain a warning system within 3 km of the plant, and has a network of 10 warning stations equipped with sirens and strobes.

A variety of radiation monitoring measures are in place. Milk samples from local farms are collected weekly. Drinking water at treatment plants in Kincardine and Southampton is sampled twice daily, and tested weekly. Ground water is sampled from several surface water, shallow and deep well locations. Aquatic sediment and fish are analysed, as well as livestock feed, honey, eggs, fruits and vegetables.

== Reactor data ==
The Bruce Generating Station consist of 8 operational reactors.

List of units in the Bruce Generating Station
Phase	Unit No.	Reactor		Status	Capacity in MWe		Construction start	First criticality	Commercial operation	Closure
Phase	Unit No.	Type	Model	Status	Net	Gross	Construction start	First criticality	Commercial operation	Closure
A	1	PHWR	CANDU 791	Operational	774	830	1 June 1971	17 December 1976	1 September 1977	(2042)
A	2	PHWR	CANDU 791	Operational	777	830	1 December 1970	27 July 1976	1 September 1977	(2043)
A	3	PHWR	CANDU 750A	Operational	770	830	July 1972	28 November 1977	1 February 1978	(2064)
A	4	PHWR	CANDU 750A	Operational	769	830	September 1972	10 December 1978	18 January 1979	(2064)
B	5	PHWR	CANDU 750B	Operational	817	872	June 1978		1 March 1985	(2064)
B	6	PHWR	CANDU 750B	Operational	817	891	January 1978		15 September 1984	(2064)
B	7	PHWR	CANDU 750B	Operational	817	872	May 1979		10 April 1986	(2064)
B	8	PHWR	CANDU 750B	Operational	817	872	August 1979		22 May 1987	(2064)

== See also ==
- Nuclear power in Canada
- List of largest power stations in Canada
- List of largest power stations
- Huron Wind
