= Nuclear power in Canada =

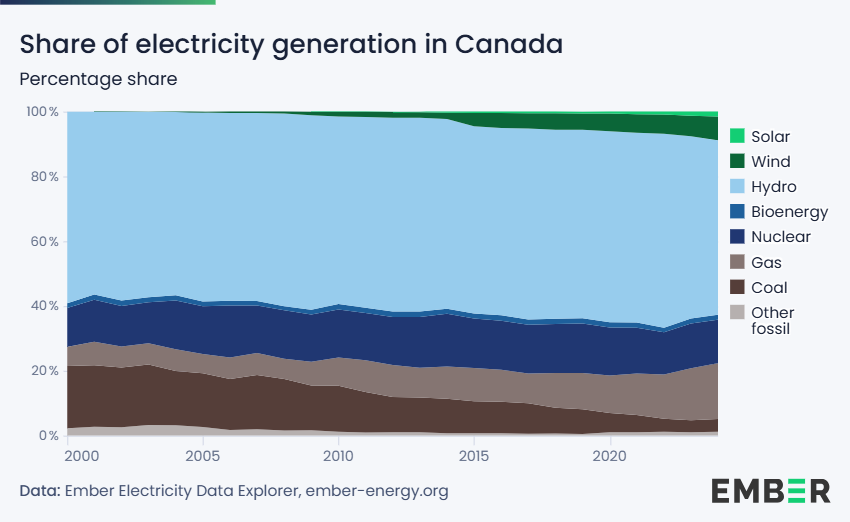
Electricity generation in Canada by source - percentage share

Nuclear power in Canada is provided by 17 commercial reactors with a net capacity of 12.7 gigawatt (GW), producing a total of 84.6 terawatt-hours (TWh) of electricity, which accounted for 13% of the country's total electric energy generation in 2023. All but one of these reactors are located in Ontario, where they produced 53% of the province's electricity in 2022. One reactor is located in New Brunswick, where it produced 28% of the electricity. Seven smaller reactors are used for research and to produce radiopharmaceuticals for use in nuclear medicine.

All currently operating Canadian nuclear reactors are a type of pressurized heavy-water reactor (PHWR) of domestic design, the CANDU reactor. CANDU reactors have been exported to India, Pakistan, Argentina, South Korea, Romania, and China. With two new CANDU reactors under construction in Romania and more proposed elsewhere, Canada is a technology leader in heavy water reactors and natural uranium fueled reactors more broadly. The Indian IPHWR-line is an indigenized derivative of the CANDU while only a small number of pressurized heavy water reactors were built independent of the CANDU-line, mainly Atucha nuclear power plant in Argentina. In 2025, nuclear power produced 13% of the country’s electricity.

== History ==
The nuclear industry (as distinct from the uranium industry) in Canada dates back to 1942 when a joint British-Canadian laboratory, the Montreal Laboratory, was set up in Montreal, Quebec, under the administration of the National Research Council of Canada, to develop a design for a heavy-water nuclear reactor. This reactor was called the National Research Experimental (NRX) reactor and would be the most powerful research reactor in the world when completed.

=== Experimental reactors ===
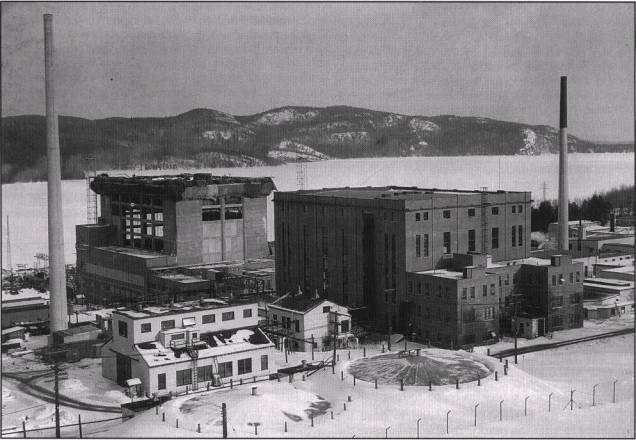
ZEEP (left), NRX (right) and NRU (back) reactors at Chalk River, 1954

In 1944, approval was given to proceed with the construction of the smaller ZEEP (Zero Energy Experimental Pile) test reactor at Chalk River Nuclear Laboratories in Ontario and on September 5, 1945, at 3:45 p.m., the 10-watt ZEEP achieved the first self-sustained nuclear reaction outside the United States.

In 1946, the Montreal Laboratory was closed, and the work continued at the Chalk River Nuclear Laboratories. Building partly on the experimental data obtained from ZEEP, the National Research Experimental (NRX)—a natural uranium, heavy water moderated research reactor—started up on July 22, 1947. It operated for 43 years, producing radioisotopes, undertaking fuels and materials development work for CANDU reactors, and providing neutrons for physics experiments. It was eventually joined in 1957 by the larger 200 megawatt (MW) National Research Universal reactor (NRU).

From 1967 to 1970, Canada also developed an experimental miniature nuclear reactor named SLOWPOKE (acronym for Safe LOW-POwer Kritical Experiment). The first prototype was assembled at Chalk River and many SLOWPOKEs were built, mainly for research. Two SLOWPOKEs are still in use in Canada; one in Kingston, Ontario; the one at École Polytechnique de Montréal has been running since 1976.

=== Nuclear power plants ===
In 1952, the Canadian government formed Atomic Energy of Canada Limited (AECL), a Crown corporation with the mandate to develop peaceful uses of nuclear energy. A partnership was formed between AECL, Ontario Hydro and Canadian General Electric to build Canada's first nuclear power plant, Nuclear Power Demonstration (NPD). The 20 MW_{e} NPD started operation in June 1962 and demonstrated the unique concepts of on-power refuelling using natural uranium fuel, and heavy water moderator and coolant. These features formed the basis of a fleet of CANDU power reactors (CANDU is an acronym for CANada Deuterium Uranium) built and operated in Canada and elsewhere. Starting in 1961, AECL led the construction of 24 commercial CANDU reactors in Ontario, Quebec, and New Brunswick.

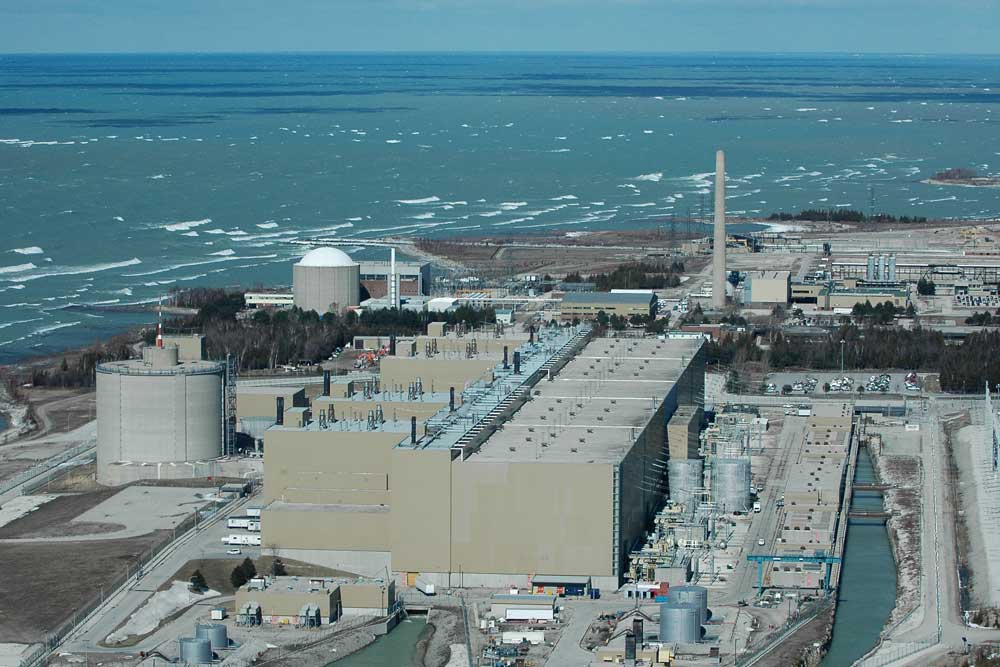
Bruce B (front) and Douglas Point (white dome) nuclear power plants

The first full-scale CANDU reactor entered service on September 26, 1968, at Douglas Point on the shore of Lake Huron in Ontario. Two years later a reactor of comparable power but of a different design became operational along the Saint Lawrence River in Quebec. Gentilly-1 was a prototype CANDU-BWR reactor with features intended to reduce its cost and complexity. After the equivalent of only 180 on-power days over nearly seven years (a 5.7% lifetime capacity factor), Gentilly-1 was closed in June 1977. Douglas Point, also suffering from unreliability with a lifetime capacity factor of 55.6%, was deemed a financial failure and shut down in May 1984.

In August 1964, Ontario Hydro decided to build the first large-scale nuclear power plant in Canada at Pickering on Lake Ontario, only 30 kilometres from downtown Toronto to save on transmission costs. To reduce cost the reactors share safety systems including containment and the emergency core cooling system. Pickering A station started operations in 1971 at a cost of $716 million (1965). It was followed by the Bruce A station, built in 1977 at a cost of $1.8 billion on the same site as the Douglas Point reactor. Beginning in 1983 four B reactors were added to the existing Pickering units, with all of them sharing the same common infrastructure as the A reactors. The final cost for these four new reactors was $3.84 billion (1986). Likewise for $6 billion, four new reactors were added to the Bruce site starting in 1984, but in a separate building with their own set of shared infrastructure for the new reactors. After a loss of coolant accident occurred at Pickering reactor A2 in August 1983, four of the reactors had their pressure tubes replaced between 1983 and 1993 at a cost of $1 billion (1983).

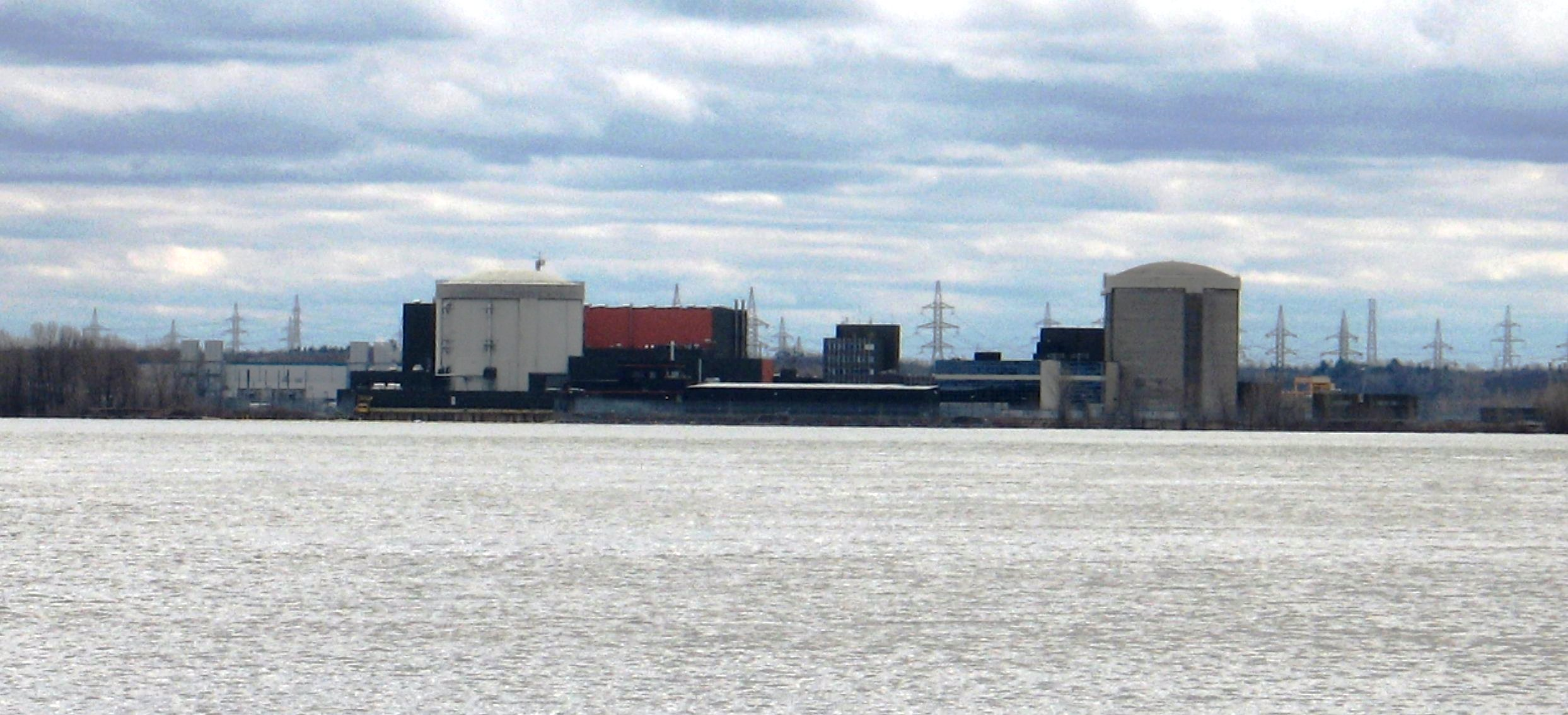
Gentilly-1 (right) and 2 (left) nuclear reactors

As most of the development of nuclear energy was taking place in Ontario, Quebec nationalists were eager to benefit from a promising technology. Hydro-Quebec initially planned to build as many as 40 reactors in the province, but the government chose to pursue hydroelectric mega-projects instead (see the James Bay Project). At the end of the 1970s, public opinion about nuclear energy shifted, and only one new reactor at Gentilly was operational by 1983. The same year, another reactor began operation at Point Lepreau, New Brunswick, a province longing to diversify its energy sources since the oil crisis of 1973.

In 1977, a new plant close to Toronto, Darlington, was approved for completion in 1988 at an estimated cost of $3.9 billion (1978). After much controversy the last unit came into service five years late. By then the cost had ballooned to $14.4 billion (1993). In the wake of this cost, a Darlington B plant was cancelled. At this point, the operating Canadian reactors fleet consisted of eight units at the Pickering site, eight units at the Bruce site, four units at the Darlington site, one unit at Gentilly in Quebec, and one unit at Point Lepreau in New Brunswick for a 14.7 GW_{e} net total operational installed capacity.

=== Refurbishment or closure ===
By 1995 the Pickering and Bruce A units needed refurbishment as after 25 years effective full power years of operation, the embrittled fuel channels face an increased risk of rupture and must be replaced. The first reactor to close was Bruce A unit 2 in November 1995 because of a maintenance accident. After criticism of Ontario Hydro plants management and a series of incidents, on December 31, 1997, the four A reactors at Pickering and unit 1 at Bruce A were abruptly shut down. They were followed by the remaining two Bruce A units three months later. Over 5 GW of Ontario's electric capacity was abruptly shut down, but at this point, the reactors were supposed to restart at six-month intervals starting in June 2000.

In 1999, indebted Ontario Hydro was replaced by Ontario Power Generation (OPG). The next year, OPG leased its Bruce A and B nuclear stations to Bruce Power, a consortium led by British Energy. Pickering's A4 and A1 reactors were refurbished from 1999 to 2003 and from 2004 to 2005, respectively. To prevent a power shortage while phasing out Ontario's coal-burning plants, Bruce A units 3 and 4 were returned to service in January 2004 and October 2003 respectively, and then units 1 and 2 were completely refurbished for $4.8 billion (2010). Of the eight units laid down, four were refurbished, two were restarted without refurbishment, and two (Pickering A2 and A3) were definitively shut down.

In April 2008, refurbishment began at Point Lepreau and had been estimated to be completed in September 2009 at a cost of $1.4 billion. Plagued by delays, the work was finalized three years late and largely over budget. Hydro-Quebec had decided in August 2008 to similarly refurbish Gentilly-2 starting in 2011. Because of delays with the Point Lepreau rebuild, and for economic reasons in a province with hydroelectricity surpluses, the plant was permanently shut down in December 2012. It should remain dormant 40 more years before being dismantled.

Following the 2011 Japanese nuclear accidents, the Canadian Nuclear Safety Commission (CNSC) ordered all reactor operators to revisit their safety plans and report on potential improvements by the end of April 2011. The International Atomic Energy Agency (IAEA) later conducted a review of the CNSC's response to the events at Japan's Fukushima Daiichi Nuclear Power Plant, and concluded that it was "prompt, robust and comprehensive, and is a good practice that should be used by other regulatory bodies".

=== Massive refurbishments ===
As of 2022, OPG are planning to shut down the 2 Pickering A units by 2024 and keep the Pickering B units operating through to 2026. However, OPG reviewed its operational plan and decided that Pickering B could continue operations through to 2026 and are reassessing the feasibility of refurbishing the four Pickering B units and adding another 30 years of operation to their life. Meanwhile, the Darlington reactors are gradually undergoing a $12.8 billion complete refurbishment currently underway on Units 1 and 3 while Unit 2 successfully completed its refurbishment in 2020. Bruce Power will follow the same plan for its 8 CANDU-750 units. This even more massive undertaking started in January 2020 and should cost $13 billion. The newly refurbished Darlington and Bruce reactors should then be operating until at least 2050 and through to 2064. To compensate for the programmed shut down of numerous reactors, the Government of Ontario decided in January 2016 to push the retirement date of the Pickering A plant to 2024 while reviewing the possibility of refurbishing Pickering B. As of December 31, 2024, the last reactor at Pickering A has been shut down.

== New reactor proposals ==
Rising fossil fuel prices, an aging reactors fleet, and new concerns about reducing greenhouse gas combined to promote the building of new reactors throughout Canada during the early 2000s. However, what was seen as a nuclear renaissance petered, no new construction has started.

=== Ontario ===
==== Bruce site ====
In August 2006, Bruce Power applied for a licence to prepare its Bruce site for the construction of up to four new nuclear power units. In July 2009, the plan was shelved as a declining demand for electricity did not justify expanding production capacity. Bruce Power prioritized refurbishing its A and B plants instead.

==== Darlington site ====
In September 2006, OPG applied for a licence to prepare its Darlington site for the construction of up to four new nuclear power units. The reactor designs being first considered for this project were AECL's ACR-1000, Westinghouse's AP1000 and Areva's EPR. In 2011, the Enhanced CANDU 6 entered the competition and soon became OPG's favourite. On August 17, 2012, after environmental assessments, OPG received a Licence to Prepare Site from the CNSC. In 2013, the project was put on hold as OPG decided to concentrate on refurbishing the existing Darlington units.

In October 2013, the Ontario government declared that the Darlington new build project would not be a part of Ontario's long term energy plan, citing the high capital cost estimates and energy surplus in the province at the time of the announcement.

In November 2020, OPG resumed licensing activities, this time for the construction of one small modular reactor (SMR), later expanded to three additional BWRX-300 SMR. Site preparation begain in 2022 and the Canadian Nuclear Safety Commission approved the project in April 2025. Construction on the first SMR began in May 2025 with an expected completion date of 2030.

=== Alberta ===
Energy Alberta Corporation announced August 27, 2007, that they had applied for a licence to build a new nuclear plant in Northern Alberta at Lac Cardinal (30 km west of the town of Peace River), for two ACR-1000 reactors going online in 2017 as steam and electricity sources for the energy-intensive oil sands extraction process, which uses natural gas. However, a parliamentary review suggested placing the development efforts on hold as it would be inadequate for oil sands extraction.

Three months after the announcement, the company was purchased by Bruce Power who proposed expanding the plant to four units for a total 4 GW_{e}. These plans were upset and Bruce withdrew its application for the Lac Cardinal in January 2009, proposing instead a new site 30 km north of Peace River. Finally, in December 2011, the controversial project was abandoned.

On January 15, 2024, Alberta's Capital Power Corporation entered an agreement with Ontario Power Generation to jointly assess the feasibility of deploying Small Modular Reactors (SMRs) in Alberta. Assessments will take place over 2 years, and includes assessing scalability, and ownership & operating structures.

=== Saskatchewan ===
The Government of Saskatchewan was in talks with Hitachi Limited's Power Systems about building a small nuclear plant in the province involving a five-year study beginning in 2011.

A study in 2014 showed public support for nuclear power and highlighted a reliable supply of uranium ore in the province, but the province has not been eager moving forward and no site has been identified since 2011.

On June 27, 2022 Saskatchewan Power Corporation selected the BWRX-300 SMR for potential deployment in the mid-2030s

=== New Brunswick ===
In August 2007, a consortium named Team CANDU began a feasibility study regarding the installation of an Advanced CANDU Reactor at Point Lepreau, to supply power to the eastern seaboard. July 2010, the Government of New Brunswick and NB Power signed an agreement with Areva to study the feasibility of a new light water nuclear unit at Point Lepreau but a newly elected government two months later shelved the plan.

=== Other technologies ===
A number of Canadian startups are developing new commercial nuclear reactor designs. In March 2016, the Oakville, Ontario-based company Terrestrial Energy was awarded a $5.7 million grant by the Government of Canada to pursue development of its small IMSR Molten Salt Reactor. Thorium Power Canada Inc., from Toronto, is seeking regulatory approvals for a thorium-fuelled compact demonstration reactor to be built in Chile that could be used to power a 20 million-litre/day desalination plant. Since 2002, General Fusion, from Burnaby, British Columbia, has raised $300 million from public and private investors to build a fusion reactor prototype based on magnetized target fusion starting in 2017.

== Generation ==
Nuclear electricity production, nationally and by province, per year
	1980		1985		1990		1995		2000		2005		2010		2015		2020	
	TWh	%total	TWh	%total	TWh	%total	TWh	%total	TWh	%total	TWh	%total	TWh	%total	TWh	%total	TWh	%total
Canada	35.8	9.8%	57.1	12.8%	68.8	14.8%	92.3	17.2%	68.6	11.8%	86.8	14.5%	85.5	14.5%	95.6	16.6%	92.2	14.6%
Ontario	35.8	32.6%	48.5	40%	59.3	45.9%	86.2	58.5%	59.8	39%	77.9	49.2%	82.9	55%	92.3	60%	87.8	60%
Quebec	0	0%	3.21	2.3%	4.14	3.1%	4.51	2.6%	4.88	2.7%	4.48	2.5%	3.76	2%	0	0%	0	0%
New Brunswick	0	0%	5.43	47.5%	5.33	32%	1.57	12.5%	3.96	21.1%	4.37	21.6%	0	0%	3.3		4.78	41%

== Power reactors ==
Nuclear plants in Canada (view)
Active plants
Closed plants

Beginning in 1958, Canada built 25 nuclear power reactors over the course of 35 years, with only three of them located outside of Ontario. This made the southern part of the province one of the most nuclearized areas in the world with 12 to 20 operating reactors at any given time since 1987 inside a 120-kilometre radius.

All of the Canadian reactors are concentrated in only seven different sites, with two of them (Pickering and Bruce) being the largest nuclear generating stations in the world by total reactor count. The Bruce site, with eight active reactors and one shut down (Douglas Point) has been the largest operating nuclear power station in the world by total reactor count, the number of operational reactors, and total output between 2012 and 2020.

All of the reactors are of the PHWR type. Because CANDU reactors can be refuelled while operating, Pickering unit 3 achieved the then highest capacity factor in the world in 1977 and Pickering unit 7 held the world record for continuous operation without a shutdown (894 days) from 1994 to 2016. In 2021, a new world record (1106 days) was established by Darlington unit 1. Overall, PHWR reactors had the best lifetime average load factor of all western generation II reactors until being superseded by the PWR in the early 2000s.

Canada's nuclear power reactors timeline

=== Active ===
Active nuclear reactors in Canada
Station name	Unit name	No. (Note: Overall, among all reactors ever built in Canada)	Type	Model	Capacity			Operator	Builder	Construction start date	Grid connection date	Commercial operation date
Station name	Unit name	No.	Type	Model	Thermal (MW_{th})	Electric (MW_{e})		Operator	Builder	Construction start date	Grid connection date	Commercial operation date
Station name	Unit name	No.	Type	Model	Thermal (MW_{th})	Gross	Net	Operator	Builder	Construction start date	Grid connection date	Commercial operation date
Bruce	A1	8	PHWR	CANDU 791	2620	830	760	Bruce Power	OH/AECL	June 1971	Jan 1977	Sept 1977
Bruce	A2	9	PHWR	CANDU 791	2620	830	760	Bruce Power	OH/AECL	Dec 1970	Sept 1976	Sept 1977
Bruce	A3	10	PHWR	CANDU 750A	2550	830	750	Bruce Power	OH/AECL	July 1972	Dec 1977	Feb 1978
Bruce	A4	11	PHWR	CANDU 750A	2550	830	750	Bruce Power	OH/AECL	Sept 1972	Dec 1978	Jan 1979
Bruce	B5	18	PHWR	CANDU 750B	2832	872	817	Bruce Power	OH/AECL	June 1978	Dec 1984	Mar 1985
Bruce	B6	19	PHWR	CANDU 750B	2690	891	817	Bruce Power	OH/AECL	Jan 1978	June 1984	Sept 1984
Bruce	B7	20	PHWR	CANDU 750B	2832	872	817	Bruce Power	OH/AECL	May 1979	Feb 1986	April 1986
Bruce	B8	21	PHWR	CANDU 750B	2690	872	817	Bruce Power	OH/AECL	Aug 1979	March 1987	May 1987
Darlington	1	22	PHWR	CANDU 850	2776	934	878	OPG	OH/AECL	April 1982	Dec 1990	Nov 1992
Darlington	2	23	PHWR	CANDU 850	2776	934	878	OPG	OH/AECL	Sept 1981	Jan 1990	Oct 1990
Darlington	3	24	PHWR	CANDU 850	2776	934	878	OPG	OH/AECL	Sept 1984	Dec 1992	Feb 1993
Darlington	4	25	PHWR	CANDU 850	2776	934	878	OPG	OH/AECL	July 1985	April 1993	June 1993
Pickering	B5	13	PHWR	CANDU 500B	1744	540	516	OPG	OH/AECL	Nov 1974	Dec 1982	May 1983
Pickering	B6	14	PHWR	CANDU 500B	1744	540	516	OPG	OH/AECL	Oct 1975	Nov 1983	Feb 1984
Pickering	B7	15	PHWR	CANDU 500B	1744	540	516	OPG	OH/AECL	Mar 1976	Nov 1984	Jan 1985
Pickering	B8	16	PHWR	CANDU 500B	1744	540	516	OPG	OH/AECL	Sept 1976	Jan 1986	Feb 1986
Point Lepreau	1	17	PHWR	CANDU 6	2180	705	660	NB Power	AECL	May 1975	Sept 1982	Feb 1983

=== Permanently shut down ===
Permanently shut down nuclear reactors in Canada
Station name	Unit name	No. (Note: Overall, among all reactors ever built in Canada)	Type	Model	Capacity			Operator	Builder	Construction start date	Grid connection date	Commercial operation date	Shutdown date
Station name	Unit name	No.	Type	Model	Thermal (MW_{th})	Electric (MW_{e})		Operator	Builder	Construction start date	Grid connection date	Commercial operation date	Shutdown date
Station name	Unit name	No.	Type	Model	Thermal (MW_{th})	Gross	Net	Operator	Builder	Construction start date	Grid connection date	Commercial operation date	Shutdown date
Gentilly	1	3	SGHWR	CANDU BLW-250	792	266	250	HQ	HQ/AECL	Sept 1966	Apr 1971	May 1972	June 1977
Gentilly	2	12	PHWR	CANDU 6	2156	675	635	HQ	HQ/AECL	April 1974	Dec 1982	Oct 1983	Dec 2012
Pickering	A2	5	PHWR	CANDU 500A	1744	542	515	OH	OH/AECL	Sept 1966	Oct 1971	Dec 1971	May 2007
Pickering	A3	6	PHWR	CANDU 500A	1744	542	515	OH	OH/AECL	Dec 1967	May 1972	June 1972	Oct 2008
Pickering	A1	4	PHWR	CANDU 500A	1744	542	515	OH/OPG	OH/AECL	June 1966	April 1971	July 1971	Sept 2024
Pickering	A4	7	PHWR	CANDU 500A	1744	542	515	OH/OPG	OH/AECL	May 1968	May 1973	June 1973	Dec 2024
Douglas Point	1	2	PHWR	CANDU 200	704	218	206	OH	OH/AECL	Feb 1960	Jan 1967	Sept 1968	May 1984
Nuclear Power Demonstration	NPD	1	PHWR	CANDU prototype	92	25	22	OH	CGE	Jan 1958	June 1962	Oct 1962	Aug 1987

== Research reactors ==
Research reactors in Canada
Place	Reactor name	Reactor type	Thermal power (kWt)	Const. start	First critical	Status	Notes
Chalk River Laboratories - Chalk River, Ontario	ZEEP	Heavy Water	0.001	1945	1945-09-05	Decommissioned 1973	First nuclear reactor in Canada, and first outside the United States.
Chalk River Laboratories - Chalk River, Ontario	NRX	Heavy Water	42 000	1944	1947-07-22	Shut down 1993-03-30	One of the highest flux reactors in the world. Research and medical isotope production.
Chalk River Laboratories - Chalk River, Ontario	NRU	Heavy Water	135 000	1952	1957-11-03	Shut down 2018-03-31	Research and medical isotope production.
Chalk River Laboratories - Chalk River, Ontario	PTR	Pool	0.1	1956-05-01	1957-11-29	Shut down 1990-10-05	Pool test reactor. Research.
Chalk River Laboratories - Chalk River, Ontario	ZED-2	Tank	0.2	1958-12-01	1960-09-07	Operational	Zero-power research reactor
Chalk River Laboratories - Chalk River, Ontario		SLOWPOKE	5		1970	Moved 1971	Prototype. Moved to University of Toronto.
Chalk River Laboratories - Chalk River, Ontario	MAPLE I	Tank in pool	10 000	1997-12-01	2000	Cancelled 2008	Medical isotope production reactors. Program terminated before operations.
Chalk River Laboratories - Chalk River, Ontario	MAPLE II	Tank in pool	10 000		2003	Cancelled 2008	Medical isotope production reactors. Program terminated before operations.
McMaster University - Hamilton, Ontario	MNR	MTR	5 000	1957-09-01	1959-04-04	Operational	Operating at 3 MWt. The highest-flux research reactor in Canada since the closing of the National Research Universal (NRU) reactor in Chalk River in 2018.
Whiteshell Laboratories - Pinawa, Manitoba	WR-1	CANDU	60 000	1962-11-01	1965-11-01	Shut down 1985-05-17	Organic cooled prototype. Plant had coolant leak of 2,739 litres in November 1978.
Whiteshell Laboratories - Pinawa, Manitoba	SDR	SLOWPOKE-3	2 000	1985	1987-07-15	Shut down 1989	Slowpoke demonstration reactor for district heating
Tunney's Pasture - 20 Goldenrod Driveway, Ottawa, Ontario		SLOWPOKE	20	1970	1971-05-14	Shut down 1984	Prototype
University of Toronto Haultin Building - Toronto, Ontario		SLOWPOKE	5	1971	1971-06-05	Dismantled 1976	Power increased to 20kWt in 1973.
University of Toronto Haultin Building - Toronto, Ontario		SLOWPOKE-2	20	1976	1976	Shut down 2001	
École Polytechnique de Montréal - Montreal, Quebec		SLOWPOKE-2	20	1975	1976-05-01	Operational	Converted to Low-enriched uranium (LEU) fuel
Dalhousie University Trace Analysis Research Centre - Halifax, Nova Scotia		SLOWPOKE-2	20	1976-04-15	1976-07-08	Dismantled 2011	
University of Alberta - Edmonton		SLOWPOKE-2	20	1976	1977-04-22	Dismantled August 5, 2017	
Saskatchewan Research Council - Saskatoon		SLOWPOKE-2	16	1980	1981-03-01	Shut down in December 2017	Decommissioning was expected to be completed sometime in 2020.
Kanata - original AECL and later MDS Nordion		SLOWPOKE-2	20	1984-05-14	1984-06-06	Shut down 1989	
Royal Military College - Kingston, Ontario		SLOWPOKE-2	20	1985-08-20	1985-09-06	Operational	First low-enriched uranium (LEU) fuelled

== Notable accidents ==
=== Chalk River ===
- On December 12, 1952, the world's first major nuclear reactor accident (INES level 5) happened at Chalk River Laboratories, 180 kilometres north-west of Ottawa. A power excursion and partial loss of coolant led to severe damages to the NRX reactor core resulting in fission products being released through the reactor stack and 4.5 tonnes of contaminated water collecting in the basement of the building. The future US president Jimmy Carter, at the time a U.S. Navy lieutenant, was among the 1,202 people involved in the two-year-long clean-up;
- May 24, 1958, a fuel rod caught fire and ruptured as it was being removed from the NRU reactor leading to the complete contamination of the building. As in 1952, the military was called in to aid and approximately 679 people were employed in the clean-up.

=== Pinawa ===
In November 1978 a loss of coolant accident affected the experimental WR-1 reactor at Whitshell Laboratories in Pinawa, Manitoba. 2,739 litres of coolant oil (terphenyl isomer) leaked, most of it into the Winnipeg River, and three fuel elements broke with some fission products being released. The repair took several weeks for workers to complete.

=== Pickering ===
- On August 1, 1983, pressure tubes—which hold fuel rods—ruptured due to hydriding at the Pickering reactor 2. Some coolant escaped, but was recovered before it left the plant, and there was no release of radioactive material from the containment building. All four reactors were re-tubed with new materials (Zr-2.5%Nb) over ten years;
- On August 2, 1992, a heavy water leak at Pickering reactor 1 heat exchanger released 2.3 petabecquerel (PBq) of radioactive tritium into Lake Ontario, resulting in increased levels of tritium in drinking water along the lake shoreline;
- On December 10, 1994, a pipe break at Pickering reactor 2 resulted in a major loss of coolant accident and a spill of 185 tonnes of heavy water. The Emergency Core Cooling System had to be used to prevent a core meltdown. It has been called "the most serious nuclear accident in Canada" by The Standing Senate Committee on Energy, the Environment and Natural Resources in 2001.
- On January 12, 2020, a nuclear incident alert was sent out via the Alert Ready system at 07:23 EST (UTC -5), to all residents of Ontario. The alert stated that "An incident was reported at Pickering Nuclear Generating Station" and that "people near the Pickering Nuclear Generating Station DO NOT need to take any protective actions at this time." It was later revealed that, in a statement by MPP Sylvia Jones, "The cause of the alert was revealed to be an error during a 'routine training exercise' being conducted by the Provincial Emergency Operations Center (PEOC)".

=== Darlington ===
In 2009, more than 200,000 litres of water containing trace amounts of tritium and hydrazine spilled into Lake Ontario after workers accidentally filled the wrong tank with tritiated water. However the level of the isotope in the lake was not enough to pose harm to residents.

=== Point Lepreau ===
On December 13, 2011, a radioactive spill happened at New Brunswick's Point Lepreau nuclear generating station during refurbishment. Up to six litres of heavy water splashed to the floor, forcing an evacuation of the reactor building and halt of operations. On December 14, NB Power issued a news release, admitting there had been another type of spill three weeks earlier.

== Fuel cycle ==
CANDU type reactors operating in Canada have the particularity of being able to use natural uranium as fuel because of their high neutron economy. Therefore, the costly fuel enrichment step required by the more prevalent light-water reactor types can be avoided. However this comes at the cost of heavy water usage which, for example, represented 11% ($1.5 billion) of the capital costs of the Darlington plant.

The low uranium-235 density in natural uranium (0.7% ^{235}U) compared with enriched uranium (3-5% ^{235}U) implies that less fuel can be consumed before the fission rate drops too low to sustain criticality, explaining why fuel burn-up in CANDU reactors (7.5 to 9 GW.day/tonnes) is far lower than in PWR reactors (50 GW.d/t). Therefore, a lot more fuel is used and consequently a lot more spent fuel is produced by CANDUs for a given quantity of energy produced (140 t.GWe/year for a CANDU vs 20 t.GWe/year for a PWR). Yet mined uranium utilization is lower by almost 30% in a CANDU because there is no wasteful enrichment step during the ore processing into fuel. Paradoxically heavy-water reactors in Canada use less uranium but produce more spent fuel than their light water counterparts.

=== Uranium mining ===
In 2009, Canada had the 4th largest recoverable uranium reserves in the world (at a cost of less than 130 USD/kg) and was up until that date the world's largest producer. The only currently active mines and most prominent uranium reserves are in the Athabasca Basin of northern Saskatchewan. Cameco's McArthur River mine, opened in 2000, is both the largest high-grade uranium deposit and the largest producer in the world.

Approximately 15% of Canada's uranium production is used to fuel domestic reactors, the rest being exported.

=== Fuel production ===
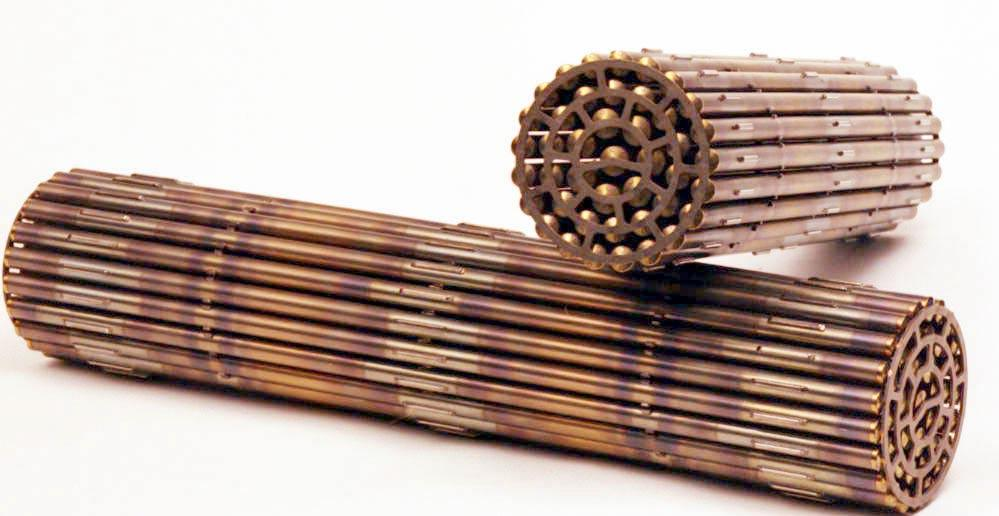
CANDU fuel bundles

Uranium ore concentrate (yellowcake) from mines in Canada and elsewhere is processed into uranium trioxide (UO_{3}) at Cameco's Blind River plant, the world's largest commercial uranium refinery. This purer form of uranium is the raw material for the next stage of processing happening in Port Hope, Ontario. There, Cameco's conversion facility produces uranium hexafluoride (UF_{6}) for foreign uranium enrichment facilities and uranium dioxide (UO_{2}) for local fuel manufacturers. Cameco's Port Hope and BWXT's Peterborough and Toronto fuel manufacturing facilities turns uranium dioxide powder into ceramic pellets before sealing these into zirconium tubes to form fuel rods assembled into bundles for CANDU reactors in Canada and elsewhere.

=== Waste disposal ===
Like in the USA or Finland, the policy of Canada is not to reprocess spent nuclear fuel but to directly dispose of it for economic reasons.

In 1978, the government of Canada launched a nuclear fuel waste management program. In 1983, an underground laboratory was constructed at Whiteshell Laboratories in Manitoba to study the geological conditions associated with the storage of spent nuclear fuel. The 420-metre deep facility was decommissioned and deliberately flooded in 2010 to perform one final experiment. In 2002 the Nuclear Waste Management Organization (NWMO) was founded by the industry to develop a permanent waste strategy.

==== Low- and intermediate-level waste ====
Canadian Nuclear Laboratories (CNL) plans to build a 1 million m³ Near Surface Disposal Facility (NSDF) at the Chalk River site to dispose of its low-level radioactive waste beginning in 2021.

Low-level and intermediate-level radioactive waste produced by the three Ontario nuclear power plants in operation are managed by the Western Waste Management Facility (WWMF) located at the Bruce nuclear site in Tiverton, Ontario. OPG proposed to build a deep geological repository adjacent to the WWMF to serve as a long-term storage solution for about 200,000 m³ of this waste. However, the project was not approved in a vote by the Saugeen Ojibway Nation in January 2020. OPG had previously promised not to proceed without the nation's approval. The project was cancelled in June 2020. OPG will look for alternative waste disposal solutions.

==== Spent fuel ====
As of June 2019, Canadian reactors had produced 2.9 million spent fuel bundles or around 52,000 tonnes of high-level waste, the second largest amount in the world behind the US. This number could grow to 5.5 million bundles (103,000 tonnes) at the end of the planned life of the current reactors fleet.

Spent fuel is stored at each reactor sites either in fuel pools (58% of the total) or dry cask storage (42%) when it is cool enough. Although more spent fuel is produced by CANDU reactors, dry storage costs for a given electricity production are comparable with costs for PWR reactors because the spent fuel is more easily handled (no fuel criticality). The same is true with the cost and space requirements for the permanent disposal of the waste.

In 2005, the NWMO decided to build a deep repository dedicated to store the spent nuclear fuel underground. The $24 billion price tag of this 500- to 1000-metre underground vault is to be paid by a trust fund backed by the nuclear production companies. The spent fuel bundles would be placed in steel baskets wrapped together 3 by 3 (324 fuel bundles total) in corrosion resistant copper to form containers designed to last at least a 100,000 years. The containers would be encased in the tunnels of the repository by swelling bentonite clay but remain retrievable for approximately 240 years.

The process of identifying a proper place for such a long-term facility started in 2010. Out of 22 interested communities, two, located around Ignace in Northwestern Ontario and South Bruce in Southwestern Ontario, were being studied as potential sites.

In 2024, the NWMO selected an intrusive rock formation known as the Revell Batholith, located about 35 kilometres west of Ignace (between Ignace and Wabigoon Lake Ojibway Nation) as the site for a spent nuclear fuel repository. Construction is expected to begin in the mid 2030s and become operational in the early 2040s.

== Public opinion ==
According to a 2025 poll conducted by Abacus Data, 38% of Canadians describe their feelings towards nuclear power as positive, while 22% describe their feelings as negative, with the rest falling into neutral or indifferent camps. Support ranges from a high of 54% in Saskatchewan to a low of 21% in Quebec while opposition ranges from a high of 46% in Quebec to a low of 8% in Saskatchewan. Generational demographics appear to influence support as support for nuclear power is highest among Canadians aged 18 to 29 at 54% and lowest among Canadians aged 30-44 aged group at 32% with support rising again among older groups.

=== Anti-nuclear movement ===
Canada has an active anti-nuclear movement, which includes major campaigning organizations like Greenpeace and the Sierra Club. Greenpeace was founded in Vancouver by former Sierra Club members to protest nuclear weapons tests on Amchitka Island. Over 300 public interest groups across Canada have endorsed the mandate of the Campaign for Nuclear Phaseout (CNP). Some environmental organizations such as Energy Probe, the Pembina Institute and the Canadian Coalition for Nuclear Responsibility (CCNR) are reported to have developed considerable expertise on nuclear power and energy issues. There is also a long-standing tradition of indigenous opposition to uranium mining.

The province of British Columbia firmly maintains a strict no-nuclear policy. The Crown corporation, BC Hydro, upholds this principle by "rejecting consideration of nuclear power in implementing B.C.'s clean energy strategy."

== See also ==
- Atomic Energy of Canada Limited
- Canadian Nuclear Association
- Electricity sector in Canada
- Energy Alberta Corporation
- Energy policy of Canada
- List of nuclear reactors
- List of nuclear waste storage facilities in Canada
- List of nuclear fuel storage facilities in Canada
- Multipurpose Applied Physics Lattice Experiment
- Nuclear industry in Canada
- Nuclear power accidents by country
- Pembina Institute
- Science and technology in Canada
