= Nuclear industry in Canada =

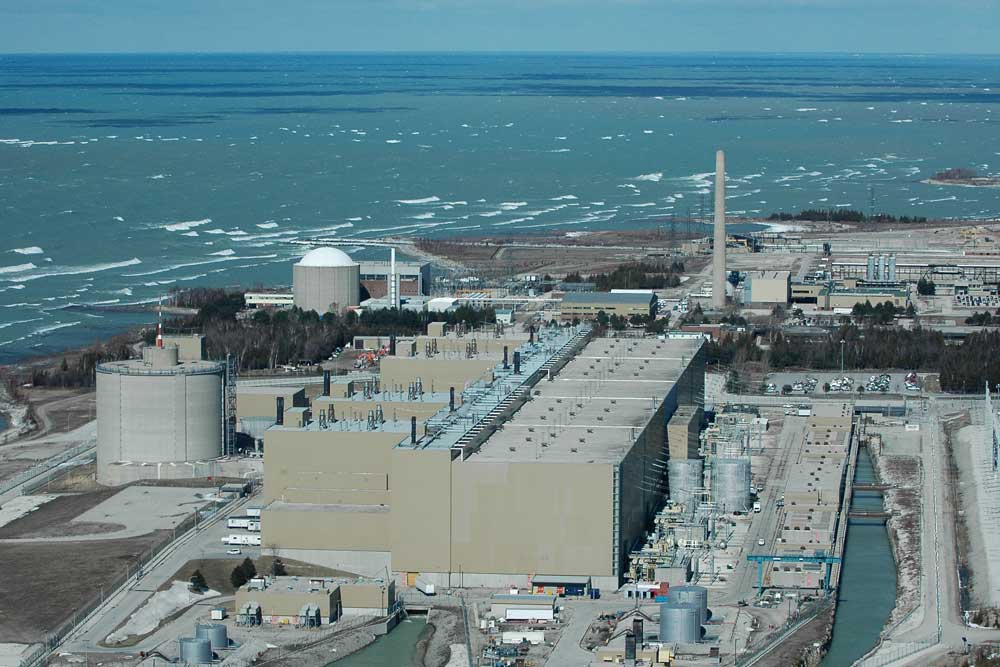
Bruce Nuclear Generating Station near Kincardine, Ontario

Nuclear industry in Canada is an active business and research sector, producing about 15% of its electricity in nuclear power plants of domestic design. Canada is the world's largest exporter of uranium, and has the world's second largest proven reserves. Canada also exports nuclear technology within the terms of the Nuclear Non-proliferation Treaty, to which it is a signatory, and is the world's largest producer of radioactive medical isotopes.

== History ==
=== Nuclear technology ===
The Nuclear industry (as distinct from the uranium industry) in Canada dates back to 1942 when a joint British-Canadian laboratory was set up in Montreal, Quebec, under the administration of the National Research Council of Canada, to develop a design for a heavy-water nuclear reactor. This reactor was called National Research Experimental and would be the most powerful research reactor in the world when completed. In the meantime, in 1944, approval was given to proceed with the construction of the smaller ZEEP (Zero Energy Experimental Pile) test reactor at Chalk River, Ontario and on September 5, 1945, at 3:45 p.m., the 10 Watt ZEEP successfully achieved the first self-sustained nuclear reaction outside the United States. ZEEP operated for 25 years as a key research facility.

The Teck Cominco smelter in Trail, British Columbia produced heavy water for the American Manhattan Project from 1942 to 1956.

In 1946, Montreal Laboratory was closed, and the work continued at Chalk River Nuclear Laboratories. Building partly on the experimental data obtained from ZEEP, the National Research Experimental (NRX)—a natural uranium, heavy water moderated research reactor—started up on July 22, 1947. It operated for 43 years, producing radioisotopes, undertaking fuels and materials development work for CANDU reactors, and providing neutrons for physics experiments. It was eventually joined in 1957 by the larger 200 megawatt (MW) National Research Universal reactor (NRU).

In 1952, the Canadian Government formed AECL, a Crown corporation with the mandate to develop peaceful uses of nuclear energy. A partnership was formed between AECL, Ontario Hydro and Canadian General Electric to build Canada's first nuclear power plant, called NPD for Nuclear Power Demonstration. The 20 MWe Nuclear Power Demonstration (NPD) started operation in 1962 and successfully demonstrated the unique concepts of on-power refuelling using natural uranium fuel, and heavy water moderator and coolant. These defining features formed the basis of a successful fleet of CANDU power reactors (CANDU is an acronym for CANada Deuterium Uranium) built and operated in Canada and elsewhere.

In the late 1960s (1967–1970), Canada also developed an experimental miniature nuclear reactor named SLOWPOKE (acronym for Safe Low-Power Kritical Experiment). The first prototype was built at Chalk River and many SLOWPOKEs were subsequently built, mainly for research. This reactor design is extremely safe and requires almost no maintenance (it is even licensed to operate unattended overnight); it can run for more than 20 years before the nuclear fuel needs replacement. There was an attempt at commercializing the reactor, as it could be used in remote areas or vehicles (research stations, electric-diesel submarines). Then, China entered the market with its SLOWPOKE-like reactor and thus, the project lost its commercial potential. Many SLOWPOKEs are still in use in Canada; there is one running at École Polytechnique de Montréal, for instance.

=== Radioisotopes ===
The existence of Canada's early nuclear program, and in particular the powerful NRX research reactor, nurtured a medical isotope and nuclear medicine R&D community at several locations across the country. Canada pioneered the cobalt-60 cancer therapy technology that became standard medical practice throughout the world (the first cobalt-60 cancer therapy was administered at the Royal Victoria Hospital in London, Ontario on October 27, 1951), and has also been involved in the development of accelerator-based cancer therapy technology.

== Framework ==
Natural Resources Canada oversees nuclear power R&D and regulation in Canada, with responsibility for the crown corporation Atomic Energy of Canada Limited (AECL) and the regulatory agency, the Canadian Nuclear Safety Commission (CNSC). AECL's commercial operations include reactor development, design and construction of CANDU nuclear reactors, and provision of reactor services and technical support to CANDU reactors worldwide.

== Power generation ==
The province of Ontario dominates Canada's nuclear power industry, containing most of the country's nuclear power generating capacity. Ontario has 16 operating reactors providing about 50% of the province's electricity, plus two reactors undergoing refurbishment. New Brunswick also has one reactor. Overall, nuclear power provides about 15% of Canada's electricity. The industry employs about 21,000 people directly and 10,000 indirectly.

There has been renewed interest in nuclear energy, spurred by increasing demand (particularly within Ontario), and the desire to comply with Canada's Kyoto Agreement obligations, although Canada withdrew from the Kyoto Protocol in December 2012. (Canada was committed to cutting its greenhouse emissions to 6% below 1990 levels by 2012, but in 2009 emissions were 17% higher than in 1990. The Harper government prioritized oil sands development in Alberta, and deprioritized improving the environment.) []. The Government of Ontario proposed plans in 2004 to build several new nuclear reactors in the province. The leading candidate is AECL's Advanced CANDU Reactor. Environmental assessments are currently underway for one site next to Bruce Power's Bruce Nuclear Generating Station in Tiverton and another next to Ontario Power Generation's Darlington Nuclear Generating Station. Bruce Power has applied for a license to generate nuclear power at Cardinal Lake in the province of Alberta.

== Medical radioisotopes ==
About 85% of the world's medical and industrial cobalt-60 is produced in Canada. The medical-use cobalt-60 is produced in the NRU research reactor at AECL's Chalk River Laboratories, while industrial-use cobalt-60 is produced in selected CANDU power reactors (in these units some adjuster rods are made of cobalt-59 for this purpose). Furthermore, over half the cobalt-60 therapy machines and medical sterilizers in the world were built in Canada, treating over half a million patients yearly.

In addition to cobalt-60, MDS Nordion also produces radioisotopes that are essential in diagnostic therapy. Some can be mixed chemically with other substances and injected into the body to allow physicians to “see” into the body, even the brain, lungs and organs that hitherto were inaccessible. Not only have these diagnostic techniques eliminated the need for much exploratory surgery, they have provided physicians with diagnostic capabilities that would otherwise have been impossible. Mild irradiation is also used to sterilize many medical supplies and some pharmaceuticals.

Canada was also a pioneer in the production of medical isotopes, and today is the world's biggest supplier of Molybdenum-99, the "workhorse" and most commonly used isotope in nuclear medicine. This isotope is generated in the NRU reactor; this is then shipped to MDS Nordion, a global supplier of radiopharmaceuticals based in Kanata, Ontario (near Ottawa). There are more than 4000 Mo-99 treatments daily in Canada, and 40,000 daily in the US. Canada produces about 30-40% of the global supply of molybdenum-99.

== Uranium production ==
Canada is the world's largest producer of uranium with about one third of world production coming from Saskatchewan mines. There are two major players in the uranium mining sector.

Cameco operates the McArthur River mine, which started production at the end of 1999. Its ore is milled at Key Lake, which once contributed 15% of world uranium production but is now mined out. Its other former mainstay is Rabbit Lake mine, which still has some reserves at Eagle Point mine, where mining resumed in mid-2002 after a three-year break. An underground reserve replacement program is adding to reserves faster than they are being mined.

Areva Resources Canada operates the McClean Lake mine, which started production in mid-1999. Its Cluff Lake mine has now closed, and is being decommissioned.

In December 2004, the Cigar Lake Joint Venture (AREVA Resources Canada 37.1%, Cameco Corporation 50.025%, Idemitsu Uranium Exploration Canada Ltd. 7.875%, and TEPCO Resources 5%) partners agreed to proceed with development of the Cigar Lake uranium mine -the second largest known high-grade uranium deposit in the world, after McArthur River. With federal and provincial approvals in place, full construction began in January 2005.

All of Canada's uranium production now comes from the high-grade unconformity-type uranium deposits of the Athabasca Basin of northern Saskatchewan, such as Rabbit Lake, McClean Lake, McArthur River, and Cigar Lake.

The uranium industry invested at least CDN $3.5 billion during the 20th century, with capital investment in mines of CDN $2.5 billion, and exploration and predevelopment expenditures exceeding CDN $1 billion. Adjusting for inflation, there have been three investment booms. The first small one came with the initial developments in the Beaverlodge area in the 1950s. The second and largest boom was in the 1970s, with the opening of the Cluff and Rabbit lake mines, and the third was in the 1990s with the development of the higher grade ores on the east side.

== Nuclear waste management ==
Radioactive waste in Canada can be grouped into three broad categories: nuclear fuel waste, low-level radioactive waste, and uranium mill tailings. The most recent inventory of these wastes is provided in the LLRWMO 2004 report. At the end of 2003, the total amount of nuclear fuel waste was 6,800 m^{3}.

Canada's used nuclear fuel is now safely stored at licensed facilities at the reactor sites. On site storage options are expected to perform well over the near term; however, existing reactor sites were not chosen for their suitability as permanent storage sites. Furthermore, the communities hosting the nuclear reactors have a reasonable expectation that used nuclear fuel will eventually be moved.

In 2002 the Government of Canada passed the Nuclear Fuel Waste Act, requiring the owners of used nuclear fuel to create the Canada's Nuclear Waste Management Organisation (NWMO). This Act required that the NWMO engage citizens, specialists, stakeholders and the Aboriginal peoples in research and dialogue to assess the options for long-term management of this material.

In 2005, the NWMO recommended "Adaptive Phased Management" as the foundation for managing the risks and uncertainties that are inherent in the very long time frames over which used nuclear fuel must be managed. In 2007, the Government of Canada approved this approach, and authorized NWMO to begin implementation.

In summary the program commits Canada to the first steps to manage the used nuclear fuel it has created. It espouses sequential and collaborative decision-making to provide flexibility to adapt to experience and technical change. It aims to provide a viable, safe and secure long-term storage solution, with the potential of retrieving used fuel until and if and when a decision is made to seal the facility permanently. It is meant to provide the capacity to transfer responsibility from one generation to the next. The key technical element of the approach is the ultimate centralized containment and isolation of the used fuel and other high level waste in a deep geological repository in a suitable rock formation, such as the crystalline rock of the Canadian Shield or Ordovician sedimentary rock.

== See also ==
- List of Canadian nuclear facilities
- Canadian Nuclear Association
- Atomic Energy of Canada Limited
- Canada and weapons of mass destruction
- Energy Alberta Corporation
- Pembina Institute
- Anti-nuclear movement in Canada
- Science and technology in Canada
