= List of nuclear power accidents by country =

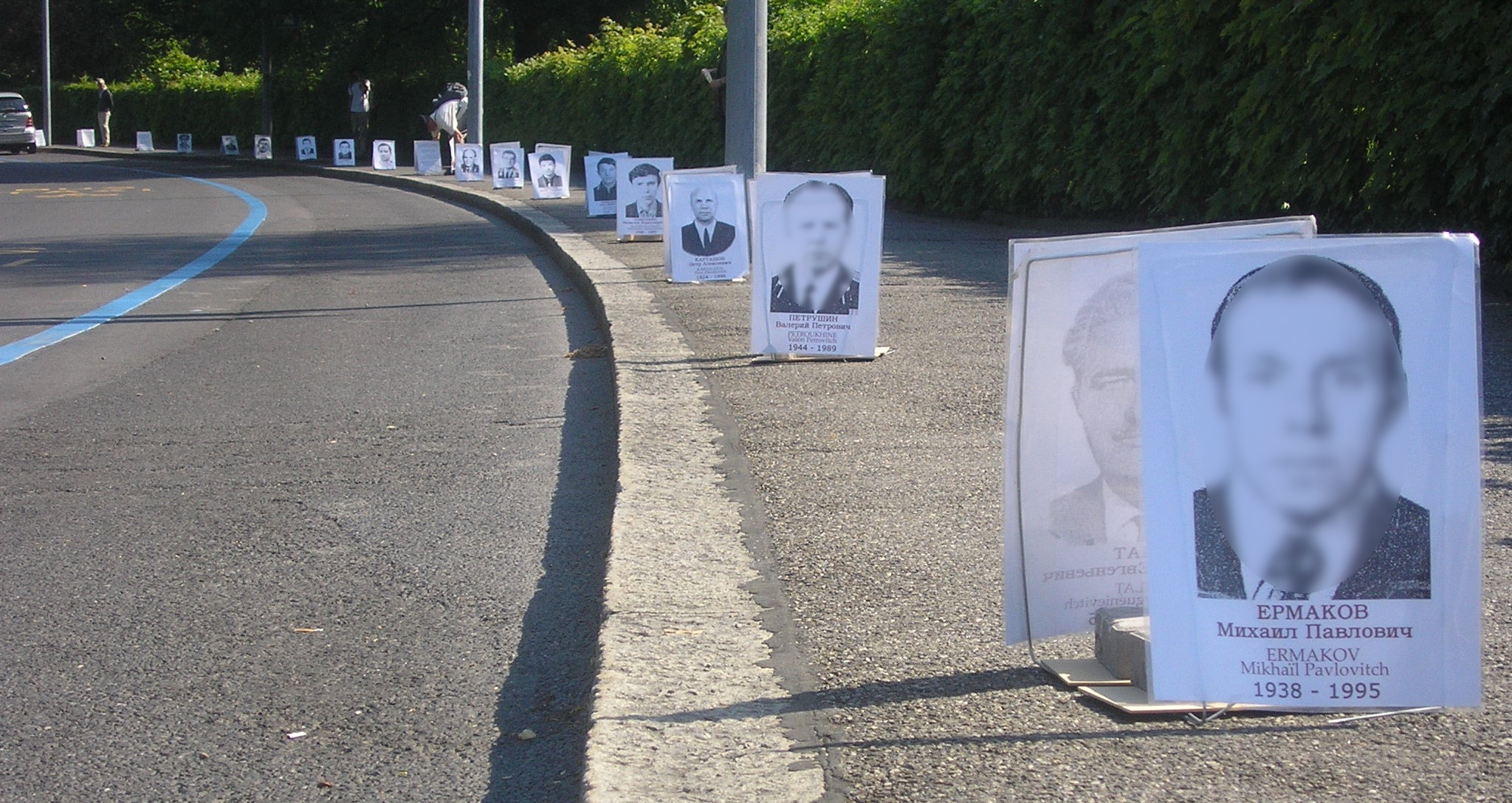
Deceased liquidators' portraits used for an anti-nuclear power protest in Geneva

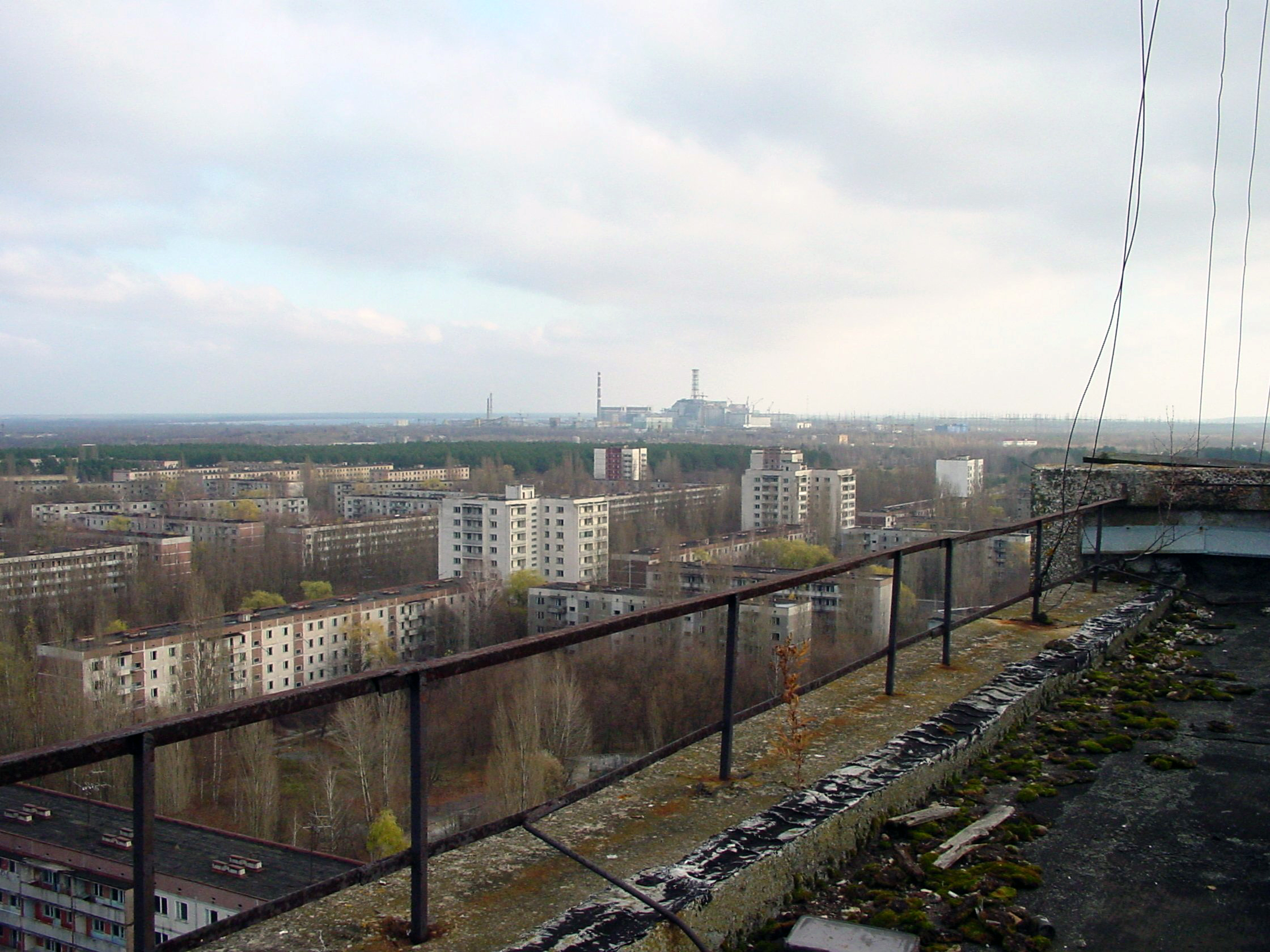
The abandoned city of Pripyat, Ukraine, with the post-disaster Chernobyl nuclear power plant in the distance

Worldwide, many nuclear accidents and serious incidents have occurred before and since the Chernobyl disaster in 1986. Two thirds of these mishaps occurred in the US.

== Nuclear safety ==
The nuclear power industry has improved the safety and performance of reactors, and has proposed new safer (but generally untested) reactor designs but there is no guarantee that the reactors will be designed, built and operated correctly. Mistakes do occur and the designers of reactors at Fukushima in Japan did not anticipate that a tsunami generated by an unexpected large earthquake would disable the backup systems that were supposed to stabilize the reactor after the earthquake. According to UBS AG, the Fukushima I nuclear accidents have cast doubt on whether even an advanced economy like Japan can master nuclear safety. Catastrophic scenarios involving terrorist attacks are also conceivable. An interdisciplinary team from MIT has estimated that given the expected growth of nuclear power from 2005 to 2055, at least four serious nuclear accidents would be expected in that period.

== Overview ==
Globally, there have been at least 99 (civilian and military) recorded nuclear power plant accidents from 1952 to 2009 (defined as incidents that either resulted in the loss of human life or more than US$50,000 of property damage, the amount the US federal government uses to define nuclear energy accidents that must be reported), totaling US$20.5 billion in property damages. Property damage costs include destruction of property, emergency response, environmental remediation, evacuation, lost product, fines, and court claims. Because nuclear power plants are large and complex, accidents on site tend to be relatively expensive.

The 1979 Three Mile Island accident in Pennsylvania was caused by a series of failures in secondary systems at the reactor, which allowed radioactive steam to escape and resulted in the partial core meltdown of one of two reactors at the site, making it the most significant accident in U.S. history.

The world's worst nuclear accident has been the 1986 Chernobyl disaster in the Soviet Union, one of two accidents that has been rated as a level 7 (the highest) event on the International Nuclear Event Scale. Note that the Chernobyl disaster may have scored an 8 or 9, if the scale continued. The accident occurred at the Chernobyl Nuclear Power Plant after an unsafe systems test led to a series of steam explosions that destroyed reactor number four. The plume spread in the near distance primarily over Belarus and after that covered extensive portions of Europe with traces of radioactivity, leaving reindeer in Northern Europe and sheep in portions of England unfit for human consumption. A 30 kilometres (19 mi) "Zone of alienation" has been formed around the reactor.

== Transparency ==
China doesn't deliver much useful information about the incidents of its fast growing fleet of nuclear power plants. The same problem exists with Russia, after Glasnost-transparency again under Vladimir Putin.

== Belgium ==
This list is incomplete but there are no known fatalities in Belgium. See the Laka Foundation's list of recent nuclear and radiological incidents in Belgium from which this table is (partially) derived.

Nuclear power accidents in Belgium
Date	Location	Description	Fatalities	Cost (in millions 2006 US$)	INES rating
1978	Tihange, Belgium	79 persons received doses from a Iodine-131-release of the plant.	0		
2002	Tihange	Safety injection during hot shutdown at Tihange 2 unit.	0		2
2005	Tihange	Inadequate protection relays and related setpoints.	0		2
2011	Doel, Belgium	Inadequate setting of the auxiliary feedwater turbopump.	0		2

== Canada ==
Nuclear power accidents in Canada
Date	Location	Description	Fatalities	Cost (in millions 2006 US$)	INES rating
December 12, 1952	CRL, Ontario, Canada	The NRX accident. A hydrogen explosion occurred in the reactor core due to a cascade of malfunctions and operator errors. The world's first major nuclear reactor accident.	0	See NRX accident	5
May 24, 1958	CRL, Ontario, Canada	The NRU accident. A fuel rod caught fire and broke when removed, then dispersed fission products and alpha-emitting particles in the reactor building.	0	See NRU accident.	
November 1978	WR-1 Reactor at Pinawa, Manitoba, Canada	2,739 litres of coolant oil leaked, most of it into the Winnipeg River. The repair took several weeks for workers to complete.	0	Unknown	
August 1, 1983	Pickering nuclear Reactor 2, Pickering, Ontario, Canada	LOCA loss of coolant accident. Pressure tube, that holds the fuel bundles, ruptured due to hydriding. All four reactors re-tubed with new materials (Zr-2.5%Nb) over ten years.	0	1 billion Canadian dollars (1983-1993).	
March 1986	Bruce nuclear Reactor 2, Bruce County, Ontario, Canada	LOCA Loss of coolant accident. Pressure tube rupture during pressurizing test (reactor shut down). Pressure tube holds the fuel bundles.	0	Unknown	
August 2, 1992	Pickering nuclear Reactor 1, Pickering, Ontario, Canada	A Heavy water leak of 2300 trillion becquerels of radioactive tritium into Lake Ontario, resulting in increased levels of tritium in Toronto drinking water .	0	Unknown.	
December 10, 1994	Pickering nuclear Reactor 2, Pickering, Ontario, Canada	Loss-of-coolant accident (LOCA). A spill of 185 tonnes of heavy water. The Emergency Core Cooling System was used to prevent a meltdown.	0	Unknown.	2
June 11, 2002	Bruce nuclear Reactor 6, Bruce B station. Bruce County, Ontario, Canada	Pressure tube and calandria tube damage during a channel maintenance procedure, required replacement of the two tubes.	0	Unknown	0
December 21, 2009	Darlington nuclear station. Clarington, Ontario, Canada	Around 200,000 litres of water with trace amounts of radioactive isotope tritium coming from a storage tank mistakenly were released by workers into Lake Ontario, representing 0.1% of the monthly allowed amounts of tritium for this power plant.	0	Unknown.	
March 14, 2011	Pickering nuclear Plant A Pickering, Ontario, Canada	A leak of 73 cubic metres (73,000 litres) of demineralized water into Lake Ontario from a failed pump seal. There was negligible risk to the public according to the Canadian Nuclear Safety Commission.	0	Unknown.	

== China ==
Date	Location	Description	Fatalities	Cost	INES
June 2021	Taishan Nuclear Power Plant, unit 1	Damage and leakage from fuel rod housing.	0		

== Czech Republic ==
Date	Location	Description	Fatalities	Cost	INES
1990	Dukovany Nuclear Power Station	Total loss of offsite power for all four units; one of the units two emergency diesel generators failed to start automatically, requiring a manual.	0		2
January 2024	Dukovany, unit 3	Loss of all three redundancies of the digital Reactor protection system for approximately one hour. None of the safety systems of the plant, including the automatic Reactor scram, were available during this period (manual scram was operable).	0		2

== France ==
Nuclear power accidents in France
Date	Location	Description	Fatalities	Cost (in millions 2006 US$)	INES rating
17 Oct 1969	Loir-et-Cher, France	50 kg of uranium dioxide melted inside of the A1 nuclear reactor of Saint-Laurent-des-Eaux, during a refueling operation	0	Unknown (likely far less than the 13 Mar 1980 accident)	4
25 Jul 1979	Saclay, France	Radioactive fluids escaped into drains designed for ordinary wastes, seeping into the local watershed at the Saclay BL3 Reactor	0	5	
13 Mar 1980	Loir-et-Cher, France	A malfunctioning cooling system fused fuel elements together at the Saint Laurent A2 reactor, melting two fuel assemblies and forcing an extended shutdown	0	22	4
14 Apr 1984	Bugey, France	Electrical cables failed at the command center of the Bugey Nuclear Power Plant and forced a complete shutdown of one reactor with clearly reduced safety margin	0	2	2
21 May 1986	Normandy, France	Pipe maintenance at the fuel reprocessing plant at La Hague site released a radioactive solution to which three welders and two plant workers were exposed.	0	5	
27 Dec 1999	Blayais, France	An unexpectedly strong storm flooded the Blayais Nuclear Power Plant, forcing an emergency shutdown after injection pumps and containment safety systems failed from water damage	0	55	2
21 Jan 2002	Manche, France	Control systems and safety valves failed after improper installation of condensers, forcing a two-month shutdown	0	102	
16 May 2004	Cattenom-2, Lorraine, France	Sub-standard electrical cable trays at the Cattenom-2 nuclear reactor caused a fire in an electricity tunnel, damaging many safety system cables	0	12	1
13 Jul 2008	Tricastin, France	Thirty cubic meters of wastewater contaminated with uranium were accidentally poured on the ground and runoff into a nearby river	0	7	1
9 Aug 2009	Gravelines, France	Assembly system failed to properly eject spent fuel rods from the Gravelines Nuclear Power Plant, causing the fuel rods to jam and the defueling operation to be suspended	0	2	1
5 Apr 2012	Penly Nuclear Power Plant, France	Fire on a primary pump of the second reactor, followed by a small radioactive leak into the containment	0		1
2017	France, generic	20 reactors of the 1300 MW-class with seismic weaknesses on their Emergency diesel generators	0		2
2023	Penly, France	Deep corrosion crack at a pipe that connects the Emergency core cooling water with the Reactor one's core cooling system, elevating the risk of a Loss-of-coolant accident.	0		2

== Germany ==
Nuclear power accidents in Germany
Date	Location	Description	Fatalities	Cost (in millions 2006 US$ million)	INES
1975	Greifswald, East Germany	A near core meltdown at Greifswald Nuclear Power Plant: Three out of six cooling water pumps were switched off for a failed test. A fourth pump broke down by loss of electric power and control of the reactor was lost. 10 fuel elements were slightly damaged before recovery	0	?	3
4 May 1986	Hamm-Uentrop, Germany	Operator actions to dislodge damaged fuel elements at the Thorium high-temperature reactor released radioactivity to 4 km^{2} surrounding the facility	0	267	
17 Dec 1987	Hessen, Germany	Stop valve failed for a moment at Biblis Nuclear Power Plant, nearly leading to a bypass of the reactor water into the reactor building and subsequently the environment	0	13	

== India ==
Nuclear power accidents in India
Date	Location	Description	Fatalities	Cost (in millions 2006 US$)
4 May 1987	Kalpakkam, India	Refuelling accident at Fast Breeder Test Reactor at Kalpakkam ruptures the reactor core, resulting in a two-year shutdown	0	300
10 Sep 1989	Tarapur, Maharashtra, India	Operators at the Tarapur Atomic Power Station find that the reactor has been leaking radioactive iodine at more than 700 times normal levels. Repairs take more than a year	0	78
13 May 1992	Tarapur, Maharashtra, India	A malfunctioning tube causes the Tarapur Atomic Power Station to release 12 curies of radioactivity	0	2
31 Mar 1993	Bulandshahr, Uttar Pradesh, India	The Narora Atomic Power Station suffers a fire at two of its steam turbine blades, damaging the emergency cabling of the heavy water reactor and almost leading to a core damage	0	220
2 Feb 1995	Kota, Rajasthan, India	The Rajasthan Atomic Power Station leaks radioactive helium and heavy water into the Rana Pratap Sagar River, necessitating a two-year shutdown for repairs	0	280
22 Oct 2002	Kalpakkam, India	Almost 100 kg radioactive sodium at the fast breeder reactor leaks into a purification cabin, ruining a number of valves and operating systems	0	30

== Japan ==
Nuclear power accidents in Japan
Date	Location	Description	Fatalities	Cost (in millions 2006 US$)	INES rating
8 Jan 1975	Mihama, Japan	Radioactivity released from Mihama nuclear power plant.	0		
2 Nov 1978	Fukushima No I, Japan	Japan's first criticality accident at No 3 reactor, this accident was hidden for 29 years and reported on 22 Mar 2007	0		
2 Apr 1979	Tokaimura, Japan	Two workers suffer radioactive contamination at the Tokaimura complex.	0		
24–28 Jan 1981	Tsuruga, Japan	29 workers were exposed to radiation.	0		
8 Mar 1981	Tsuruga, Japan	56 workers were exposed to about 45 tonnes of radioactive waste which spilled from storage tanks at the Tsuruga Nuclear Power Plant. The waste was cleaned up with buckets and mops, and was also discharged into Tsuruga Bay via the town sewer. At the time, the plant had recorded 30 malfunctions since it was commissioned in 1970.	0		
31 Aug 1985	Fukushima, Japan	Fire at Fukushima nuclear power plant during routine shutdown.	0		
23 Jun 1986	Tokaimura, Japan	Twelve people suffer "slight" plutonium contamination while inspecting a storeroom.	0		
8 Feb 1991	Fukui, Japan	Radioactivity was released from Mihama nuclear power plant after an emergency release valve failed. Officials said the release "did not pose a threat to humans or the environment."	0		
22 Feb 1993	Fukushima, Japan	High-pressure steam accident kills one worker and injures two others.	1		
December 1995	Tsuruga, Japan	The fast breeder Monju Nuclear Power Plant sodium leak. State-run operator Donen was found to have concealed videotape footage that showed extensive damage to the reactor.	0		
11 March 1997	Tokaimura, Japan	The Tokaimura nuclear reprocessing plant fire and explosion. 37 workers were exposed to low doses of radiation. Donen later acknowledged it had initially suppressed information about the fire.	0		
18 Jun 1999	Shika, Japan	Wrong handling of some control rods set off an uncontrolled nuclear reaction.	0		2
30 Sept 1999	Tokaimura, Japan	The criticality accident at the Tokai fuel fabrication facility. Hundreds of people were exposed to radiation and two workers later died. This is not a nuclear power plant accident, however.	2		4
2002	Onagawa, Japan	Two workers were exposed to a small amount of radiation and suffered minor burns during a fire.	0		
9 Aug 2004	Mihama, Japan	A main piping burst in the turbine building of the Mihama-3 station and killed persons present there; the subsequent investigation revealed a serious lack in systematic inspection in Japanese nuclear plants, which led to a massive inspection program.	5		1
2006	Fukushima No1, Japan	A small amount of radioactive steam was released at the Fukushima Dai-ichi plant and it escaped the compound.	0		
16 Jul 2007	Kashiwazaki, Japan	A severe earthquake (measuring 6.8 on the Richter magnitude scale) hit the region where Tokyo Electric's Kashiwazaki-Kariwa Nuclear Power Plant is located and radioactive water spilled into the Sea of Japan; as of March 2009, all of the reactors remained shut down for damage verification and repairs. The plant with seven units is the largest single nuclear power station in the world, which now again is shut down due to the Fukushima accident.	0		1
Dec 2009	Hamaoka, Japan	Leakage accident of radioactive water. 34 workers were exposed to radiation	0		
Mar 2011	Fukushima Dai-ichi, Japan	The world's second INES 7 accident. A magnitude 9.0 earthquake and associated tsunami triggered cooling problems at Fukushima 1 & 2 stations with several reactors. Loss of coolant resulted in meltdowns in three units and hydrogen explosions caused their structural damage. Radioactive steam was released into the atmosphere, and highly radioactive water spilled into the ocean through utility trenches. Some immediate injuries resulted. 117 workers received committed effective doses above 100 mSv, and 6 workers received doses above the emergency dose limit of 250 mSv.	1+; further near 573 died from indirect causes	1,200 - 2,100	7
6 June 2017	Ibaraki Prefecture	The incident occurred at the Japan Atomic Energy Agency's Oarai Research and Development Center, after a bag containing radioactive material tore open while a check on radioactive storage inside a "controlled" room was performed. It resulted in internal radiation exposure in five workers, with one of them inhaling plutonium. However, no radiation was detected in the external environment.	0		

== Pakistan ==
Nuclear power accidents in Pakistan
Date	Location	Description	Fatalities	Cost (in millions 2006 US$)
18 October 2011	Karachi, Pakistan	The KANUPP Karachi nuclear power plant imposed a seven-hour emergency after heavy water leaked from a feeder pipe to the reactor. The leakage took place during a routine maintenance shut down, and the emergency was lifted seven hours later, after the affected area was isolated.	0	N/A

== Russia ==
Nuclear power accidents in the Russian Federation
Date	Location	Description	Fatalities	Cost (in millions 2006 US$)	INES
1957	Mayak reprocessing plant, Ural-region	Kyshtym disaster: Explosion in a waste tank of the plant with a massive radioactive cloud, deteriorating deeply the health of the region's population	The accident caused nearly 200 late cancer fatalities	?	6
1975	Leningrad, Soviet Union	Reactor 1 of the Leningrad Nuclear Power Plant suffered core damage which released radioactivity.	0	?	4
1992	Saint Petersburg, Russian Federation	An RBMK reactor of the Leningrad NPP released radioactivity which traveled over north-eastern Europe. Russian officials declared that they saw no immediate danger posed by the event.	0	?	2
1997	Saint Petersburg, Russian Federation	Worker Sergei Kharitonov revealed photographs of cracked walls and groundwater seepage at a nuclear power plant waste storage facility. He also revealed that the plant has been dumping 300 litres of contaminated water into the Gulf of Finland annually "for years".	0	N/A	
April 1998	Saint Petersburg, Russian Federation	An RBMK reactor was shut down following the discovery of a radiation leak.			
Autumn 2017	Ural-region, Russian Federation	Roshydromet had issued a report that stated that a rise in beta activity of aerosoles and surfaces at all monitoring posts in South Ural from 25th Sep to 1 Oct 2017 had been detected. In two aerosol samples Ru-106 activity increase was detected. At 26th and 27th Sep Ru-106 decay products was detected in Tatarstan republic. At 27th and 28th Sep high pollution levels of aerosoles and surfaces was detected in Volgograd and Rostov-on-Don. In two aerosol samples from Chelyabinsk Oblast 986- and 440-fold activity increase was measured comparing to preceding month The Mayak nuclear facility is widely suspected as the source of the radiation.			
August 2019	Arkhangelsk region	On August 9, 2019 an explosion triggered radiation levels to rise near Nyonoksa, which was later confirmed by Russia's nuclear energy agency as an accident while testing an isotope power source for a liquid-fuelled rocket engine. Five nuclear scientists had died and three suffered from burns. Russian authorities ordered the evacuation of the village nearing the blast site, suggesting grave dangers due to nuclear radiation.	5		

== South Korea ==
Nuclear power accidents in South Korea
Date	Location	Description	Fatalities	Cost (in millions 2006 US$)
4 October 1999	Wolsung, South Korea	22 workers employed by the Korea Electric Power Corp were exposed to radioactive liquid and gas at the Wolsung-3 reactor. Two workers were initially exposed when approximately 12 gallons of heavy water leaked during pipe maintenance. A further 20 workers were exposed during clean-up operations.		

== Serbia ==
Nuclear power accidents in Serbia
Date	Location	Description	Fatalities	Cost	INES
October 1958	Vinča, Serbia	Six workers were exposed to high doses of radiation while taking out nuclear fuel rods out of the prototype nuclear reactor.	1	?	3

== Switzerland ==
Nuclear power accidents in Switzerland
Date	Location	Description	Fatalities	Cost	INES
January 1969	Lucens, Switzerland	Melting of a fuel element of the prototype power reactor (6 Megawatts el.) VAK Lucens	0	?	4

== Sweden ==
Date	Location	Description	Fatalities	Cost	INES
July 2006	Forsmark, Sweden	Unit 1 of the Forsmark Nuclear Power Plant lost the main line off offsite power. Furthermore, two strands of the emergency diesel generator system were unavailable, too. After 22 minutes with no more redundancy than the two operating diesel generators with 50 percent each of the required power to shut down the reactor, the emergency team succeeded to connect a reserve line and with that saved the reactor core from melting.	0		2
May 2011	Varberg, Sweden	A left behind wet vacuum cleaner in reactor 2 of the Ringhals NPP caught fire during a test pressurization of the reactor. The reactor had to be shut down for six months for cleaning.	0	SEK 1.8 billion (estimated)	

== Taiwan ==
Nuclear power accidents in Taiwan
Date	Location	Description	Fatalities	Cost	INES
March 2001	Maanshan, South Taiwan	Two-hour Station blackout in one of the two units of Maanshan Nuclear Power Plant due to a grounding fault leading to a Common cause failure of the two available emergency diesel buses. A Swing diesel generator for both units saved the unit from Core damage	0	?	3

== Ukraine ==
Nuclear power accidents in Ukraine
Date	Location	Description	Fatalities	Cost (in millions 2006 US$)	INES
26 Apr 1986	Pripyat, Ukraine, USSR	Overcriticality, steam explosion and meltdown (see Chernobyl disaster) necessitating the evacuation of 300,000 people from the region and dispersing radioactive material across Europe (see Effects of the Chernobyl disaster)	Around 50 directly (radiation sickness), eventually as many as 4000 (mainly cancers)	6700	7
October 1999	Pripyat, Ukraine	Metal structures broke, causing a gamma ray source to fall out of its container and expose two workers to "high" levels of radiation. The reactor was subsequently shut down until November.			

== United Kingdom ==
Nuclear accidents in the UK
Date	Location	Description	Victims	Cost (in millions 2006 US$)	INES rating
Spring, 1957	Windscale (now Sellafield), UK	Radioactivity release from a military reactor contaminated about 800 farms and introduced strontium 90 to domestic milk supply. Milk was sold to the public without any warnings.			
8 Oct 1957	Windscale (now Sellafield), UK	Fire ignited plutonium piles of the Windscale Piles, contaminating surrounding dairy farms with radioactive releases of mainly iodine and in lesser amounts cesium and strontium.	The accident is estimated to have caused around 190 cancers.	78	5
May 1967	Scotland, United Kingdom	Melting of fuel element at Dumfries and Galloway. Graphite debris partially blocked a fuel channel causing a fuel element to melt and catch fire at the Chapelcross nuclear power station. Contamination was confined to the reactor core. The core was repaired and restarted in 1969, operating until the plant's shutdown in 2004.			
May 1977	Dounreay, Scotland, UK	A hydrogen explosion at the plant caused by a reaction of potassium and sodium as ignition source. This furthermore resulted in a concrete slab being destroyed, and the debris being scattered around the facility.			
Sep 1996	Dounreay, Scotland, UK	The fuel reprocessing plant was shut down indefinitely after elevated radiation levels were detected in waste-water discharged to the sea.			
Feb 1998	Sellafield, UK	Two workers were exposed to elevated levels of radiation when the containment properties of a bag containing a contaminated filter were compromised. The workers were moved to duties elsewhere in the plant to limit their doses.			
9 May 2005	Sellafield, UK	82,966 litres of radioactive liquor made up of nitric acid containing 20 metric tonnes of dissolved uranium and 160 kilograms of plutonium leaked via a fractured pipe from primary to secondary containment within the THORP nuclear fuel reprocessing plant.	0	65	3
July until November and further on 2019/2020	Sellafield, UK	Loss of radioactive liquor into the ground from the Magnox Swarf Storage Silo (MSSS) which contains irradiated magnesium cladding materials from the UK's Magnox reactor fleet. The levels of activity contained in the lost liquor surpassed regulatory limits. Terrain remediation works will be undertaken when the facility is decommissioned.	0	?	2

== United States ==
Nuclear power accidents in USA
Date	Location	Description	Fatalities	Cost (in millions 2006 US$)	INES
November 29, 1955	Idaho Falls, Idaho, USA	Power excursion with partial core meltdown at National Reactor Testing Station's EBR-1 Experimental Breeder Reactor I	0	5	
July 26, 1959	Simi Valley, California, USA	Partial core meltdown at Santa Susana Field Laboratory’s Sodium Reactor Experiment	0	32	
January 3, 1961	Idaho Falls, Idaho, USA	Explosion at National Reactor Testing Station's SL-1 Stationary Low-Power Reactor Number One	3	22	4
October 5, 1966	Monroe, Michigan, USA	Sodium cooling system malfunctions at Enrico Fermi demonstration breeder reactor causing some fuel elements to melt	0	19	4
August 11, 1973	Palisades, Michigan, USA	Steam generator leak causes manual shutdown of pressurized water reactor	0	10	
March 22, 1975	Browns Ferry, Alabama, USA	Fire burns for seven hours and damages more than 1600 control cables for one of the three nuclear reactors at Browns Ferry, disabling core cooling systems	0	240	3
November 5, 1975	Brownsville, Nebraska, USA	Hydrogen gas explosion damages the Cooper Nuclear Station’s auxiliary building	0	13	
June 10, 1977	Waterford, Connecticut, USA	Hydrogen gas explosion damages three buildings and forces shutdown of Millstone-1 Boiling Water Reactor	0	15	
February 4, 1979	Surry, Virginia, USA	Surry Unit 2 shut down in response to failing tube bundles in steam generators	0	12	
March 28, 1979	Middletown, Pennsylvania, USA	Loss of coolant and partial core meltdown, see Three Mile Island accident and Three Mile Island accident health effects	0	2,400	5
October 17, 1981	Buchanan, New York, USA	100,000 gallons of Hudson River water leaked into the Indian Point Energy Center Unit 2 containment building from the fan cooling unit, undetected by a safety device designed to detect hot water. The flooding, covering the first 9 feet of the reactor vessel, was discovered when technicians entered the building. Two pumps which should have removed the water were found to be inoperative. NRC proposed a $210,000 fine for the incident.	0		
January 25, 1982	Rochester, New York, USA	Steam generator-leak at the Ginna Nuclear Generating Station causes extensive injection of the high pressure emergency core cooling system	0	?	
March 20, 1982	Lycoming, New York, USA	Recirculation system piping fails at Nine Mile Point Unit 1, forcing two year shutdown	0	45	
March 25, 1982	Buchanan, New York, USA	Damage to steam generator tubes and main generator resulting in a shut down Indian Point Energy Center Unit 3 for more than a year	0	56	
June 18, 1982	Senaca, South Carolina, USA	Feedwater heat extraction line fails at Oconee 2 Pressurised Water Reactor, damaging thermal cooling system	0	10	
February 12, 1983	Forked River, New Jersey, USA	Oyster Creek Nuclear Power Plant fails safety inspection, forced to shut down for repairs	0	32	
February 26, 1983	Fort Pierce, Florida, USA	Damaged thermal shield and core barrel support at St Lucie Unit 1, necessitating 13-month shutdown	0	54	
September 15, 1984	Athens, Alabama, USA	Safety violations, operator error, and design problems force six year outage at Browns Ferry Unit 2	0	110	
March 9, 1985	Athens, Alabama, USA	Instrumentation systems malfunction during start-up, which led to suspension of operations at all three Browns Ferry Units	0	1,830	
April 11, 1986	Plymouth, Massachusetts, USA	Recurring equipment problems force emergency shutdown of Boston Edison's Pilgrim Nuclear Power Plant	0	1,001	
1986	Surry, Virginia, USA	Broken Feedwater pipe at Surry Nuclear Power Plant kills 4	4	?	
March 31, 1987	Delta, Pennsylvania, USA	Peach Bottom units 2 and 3 shutdown due to cooling malfunctions and unexplained equipment problems	0	400	
December 19, 1987	Lycoming, New York, USA	Malfunctions force Niagara Mohawk Power Corporation to shut down Nine Mile Point Unit 1	0	150	
September 10, 1988	Surry, Virginia, USA	Refuelling cavity seal fails and destroys internal pipe system at Surry Unit 2, forcing 12-month outage	0	9	
March 5, 1989	Tonopah, Arizona, USA	Atmospheric dump valves fail at Palo Verde Unit 1, leading to main transformer fire and emergency shutdown	0	14	
March 17, 1989	Lusby, Maryland, USA	Inspections at Calvert Cliff Units 1 and 2 reveal cracks at pressurized heater sleeves, forcing extended shutdowns	0	120	
November 17, 1991	Scriba, New York, USA	Safety and fire problems force shut down of the FitzPatrick nuclear reactor for 13 months	0	5	
April 21, 1992	Southport, North Carolina, USA	NRC forces shut down of Brunswick Units 1 and 2 after emergency diesel generators fail	0	2	
February 3, 1993	Bay City, Texas, USA	Auxiliary feed-water pumps fail at South Texas Project Units 1 and 2, prompting rapid shutdown of both reactors	0	3	
February 27, 1993	Buchanan, New York, USA	New York Power Authority shuts down Indian Point Energy Center Unit 3 after AMSAC system fails	0	2	
March 2, 1993	Soddy-Daisy, Tennessee, USA	Equipment failures and broken pipes cause shut down of Sequoyah Unit 1	0	3	
December 25, 1993	Newport, Michigan, USA	Shut down of Fermi Unit 2 after main turbine experienced major failure due to improper maintenance	0	67	
14 January 1995	Wiscasset, Maine, USA	Steam generator tubes unexpectedly crack at Maine Yankee nuclear reactor; shut down of the facility for a year	0	62	
May 16, 1995	Salem, New Jersey, USA	Ventilation systems fail at Salem Units 1 and 2	0	34	
February 20, 1996	Connecticut, USA	Leaking valve forces shutdown Millstone Nuclear Power Plant Units 1 and 2, multiple equipment failures found	0	254	
September 2, 1996	Crystal River, Florida, USA	Balance-of-plant equipment malfunction forces shutdown and extensive repairs at Crystal River Unit 3	0	384	
September 5, 1996	Clinton, Illinois, USA	Reactor recirculation pump fails, prompting shut down of Clinton boiling water reactor	0	38	
September 20, 1996	Senaca, Illinois, USA	Service water system fails and results in closure of LaSalle Units 1 and 2 for more than 2 years	0	71	
September 9, 1997	Bridgman, Michigan, USA	Ice condenser containment systems fail at Cook Units 1 and 2	0	11	
May 25, 1999	Waterford, Connecticut, USA	Steam leak in feed-water heater causes manual shutdown and damage to control board annunciator at the Millstone Nuclear Power Plant	0	7	
September 29, 1999	Lower Alloways Creek, New Jersey, USA	Major Freon leak at Hope Creek Nuclear Facility causes ventilation train chiller to trip, releasing toxic gas and damaging the cooling system	0	2	
February 16, 2002	Oak Harbor, Ohio, USA	Severe corrosion of control rod drives in the reactor head forces 24-month outage of Davis-Besse reactor	0	143	
January 15, 2003	Bridgman, Michigan, USA	A fault in the main transformer at the Donald C. Cook nuclear power plant causes a fire that damages the main generator and back-up turbines	0	10	
June 16, 2005	Braidwood, Illinois, USA	Exelon's Braidwood Nuclear Generating Station leaks tritium and contaminates local water supplies	0	41	
August 4, 2005	Buchanan, New York, USA	Entergy's Indian Point Energy Center Nuclear Plant leaks tritium and strontium into underground lakes from 1974 to 2005		30	
March 6, 2006	Erwin, Tennessee, USA	Nuclear fuel services plant spills 35 litres of highly enriched uranium, necessitating 7-month shutdown	0	98	
November 21, 2009	Harrisburg, Pennsylvania, USA	Twelve workers were contaminated after radioactive dust was mobilized at the Three Mile Island plant during pipe maintenance works.	0		
January 7, 2010	Buchanan, New York, USA	NRC inspectors reported that an estimated 600,000 gallons of mildly radioactive steam was intentionally vented after an automatic shutdown of Indian Point Energy Center Unit 2. The levels of tritium in the steam were below those allowable by NRC safety standards.	0	0	
February 1, 2010	Vernon, Vermont, USA	Deteriorating underground pipes from the Vermont Yankee Nuclear Power Plant leak radioactive tritium into groundwater supplies	0	700	
August 2011	Louisa county, Virginia, USA	A 5.8-earthquake in the region caused the loss of offsite power at the North Anna Nuclear Generating Station. Later in the incident, the plant lost an emergency diesel generator, leading to the activation of the so-called SBO diesel generator - an emergency situation.	0	?	2
March 13, 2013	Russellville, Arkansas, USA	Temporary overhead crane collapsed at Arkansas Nuclear One's Unit 1	1	?	
January 2014	St. Lucie, Florida, USA	Flooding of the auxiliary building of the St. Lucie Nuclear Power Plant, caused by lacking proper flood barriers	0	?	
July 2016	Michigan, USA	Massive steam leak in the turbine building of Donald C. Cook Nuclear Plant, unit 2	0	?	
December 2019	Nebraska, USA	One of the two safety related component cooling systems of Cooper Nuclear Station was unable to operate, because its service water system, that takes water from the river, was plugged with silt.	0	?	
November 2022	Wright County, Minnesota, US	Monticello Nuclear Generating Plant accident: Over 1,500 cubic meters of radioactive water leaked.	0	?	

== See also ==
- Historic recurrence
- Lists of nuclear disasters and radioactive incidents
- List of nuclear and radiation fatalities by country
