= Multipurpose Applied Physics Lattice Experiment =

Failed medical isotope reactor in Canada

MAPLE, short for the Multipurpose Applied Physics Lattice Experiment, later renamed MDS Medical Isotope Reactors (MMIR), was a dedicated isotope-production facility built by AECL and MDS Nordion. It included two identical reactors, I and II, as well as the isotope-processing facilities necessary to produce a large portion of the world's medical isotopes, especially molybdenum-99, medical cobalt-60, xenon-133, iodine-131 and iodine-125.

An operational license for the MAPLE I reactor was granted in 1999, and the reactor went critical for the first time in early 2000. MAPLE II followed in the fall of 2003. Problems with the reactors during the testing period, most notably an unexpected positive power co-efficient of reactivity, led to the cancellation of the project in 2008 and the shutdown of both reactors.

== History ==
=== Background ===
With the completion of the NRX reactor in 1947, AECL's Chalk River Laboratories possessed the world's most powerful research reactor. While the large neutron fluxes available in the reactor led to advances in such fields as condensed matter physics and neutron spectroscopy, many experiments were carried out involving the production of new isotopes. The field of nuclear medicine developed when it was realized that some of these artificially created isotopes could be used to diagnose and treat many diseases, especially cancers.

Pioneering medical work done in the late 1940s and early 1950s established cobalt-60 as a useful isotope, as the relatively high-energy gamma rays produced when it undergoes beta decay are able to penetrate the skin of the patient, and deliver a greater portion of the dose directly to the tumor. The high neutron efficiency of the NRX's heavy water-moderated design, coupled with the high neutron flux of the reactor, made it relatively inexpensive for AECL to produce medical-grade cobalt-60. For example, the cost of the entire unit used to perform the first cobalt-60 treatment was about $50,000. By way of contrast, it would cost $50,000,000 just to produce enough radium (which had been previously used as a therapy source) to perform the same procedure.

With this promising start, AECL came to be a major world supplier of medical isotopes, using both the NRX reactor, and the NRU reactor, which came on-line in 1957. However, as these reactors began to age, it became clear that a new facility would be needed to continue the production of medical isotopes.

=== Beginnings ===
In the late 1980s, AECL began to acknowledge that continued isotope production would require the construction of a new reactor to replace capacity lost by the planned closing of the NRX in 1992, and the planned closing of the NRU early in the new millennium. Design work on a replacement, originally under the name "Maple-X10", began in the late 1980s.

As part of a restructuring taking place around the same time, the medical isotopes side of AECL was reorganized as Nordion in 1988. Work on the X10 project essentially ended at this point. Nordion company was purchased by MDS in 1991, and an agreement was reached between AECL and MDS Nordion that a new facility dedicated to the production of medical isotopes would be needed. A formal agreement was signed to begin the project in August 1996. Following a year-long environmental assessment, construction began in December 1997.

The design that resulted involved a facility with two identical reactors, each capable of supplying 100% of the world's medical isotope demand. The second reactor would function primarily as a backup, to ensure that the supply of isotopes would not be interrupted by maintenance or unplanned shutdowns. This is made necessary by the nature of medical isotopes; many have short half-lives, and must be used within a few days of production. With treatments being constantly carried out around the globe, an uninterruptible supply was essential.

There had been some local opposition to the use of highly enriched uranium (HEU) in the reactor, as well as from activists in the United States who fear that the uranium could be stolen by terrorists and used to fabricate a bomb.

=== Project cancellation ===
Originally planned to complete construction in 1999 and 2000, both reactors were instead completed in May 2000. An operational license was granted in August 1999 for the MAPLE I reactor, and extended to include the MAPLE II reactor in June 2000. Commissioning testing was begun immediately, with the MAPLE I achieving its first sustained reaction in February 2000, and MAPLE II following in October 2003.

However, during testing, it was noted that some of the emergency shut-off rods in the MAPLE I reactor could fail to deploy in certain demanding situations. This failure was ascribed to workmanship and design issues, and related to fine metal particles accumulating in the control rods' housing and interfering with their free movement.

In addition, later testing found that the reactors have a positive power co-efficient of reactivity (PCR), which was in disagreement with the prediction of the modelling, and was a significant barrier to commissioning. A positive power co-efficient means that the reactor becomes more reactive when it heats up; in the case of an unplanned power spike, such a design can "run away" and potentially cause a meltdown.

Consequently, significant efforts were made to resolve the outstanding issues, but progress towards commissioning the reactors was markedly slowed. During the subsequent eight-year-long delay in the start of commercial production, the project significantly overran its budgeted cost. The original budget was $140 million, but by 2005 it had already cost $300 million. Disputes over responsibility for the overruns between AECL and MDS Nordion added a further layer of complexity to the process. After considerable negotiation, AECL assumed full responsibility for the reactor in a settlement.

The MAPLE facility was granted an extension on its operating license on 25 October 2007, which would permit operations until 31 October 2011. This (final) submission envisioned that the MAPLE I reactor would be operational in late 2008.

On 16 May 2008, AECL released a statement announcing that the MAPLE program had been terminated, as it had become "no longer feasible to complete the commissioning and start-up of the reactors". In this statement, AECL indicated that they would move to further extend the licence of the operating NRU reactor to continue the production of medical isotopes. The statement left unclear what long-term direction AECL would take for its medical isotope production business.
