= Canadian Nuclear Laboratories Research Facilities =

Research facility in Chalk River, Ontario, Canada

Coordinates: 46.0477°N 77.3660°W

CNL Revitalized Research Facilities
- Interactive map of CNL Revitalized Research Facilities

General information
- Location: 286 Plant Road, Chalk River, Ontario Canada
- Client: Canadian Nuclear Laboratories

Design and construction
- Architect: HDR

Website
- https://www.cnl.ca/about-cnl/revitalization-of-the-chalk-river-laboratories/

Logistics Warehouse
- Interactive map of Logistics Warehouse

General information
- Completed: September 2020
- Cost: $30.6 million

Height
- Architectural: Projected energy use 101 kWh/sqm/yr

Technical details
- Floor area: 5016 sqm / 54000 sqft

Support and Maintenance Facility
- Interactive map of Support and Maintenance Facility

General information
- Completed: March 2021
- Cost: $32.8 million

Height
- Architectural: Project energy use 143.3 kWh/sqm/yr

Technical details
- Floor area: 4800 sqm / 51670 sqft

Science Collaboration Centre
- Interactive map of Science Collaboration Centre

General information
- Completed: Estimated spring 2023
- Cost: Estimated $62 million

Height
- Architectural: Projected energy use 130.4 kWh/sqm/yr (without data centre), 373.8k Wh/sqm/yr (with data centre)

Technical details
- Floor area: 8918 sqm / 88240 sqft

Canadian Nuclear Laboratories (CNL) research facilities are in Chalk River, Ontario, Canada, approximately 180 km northwest of Ottawa along the Ottawa River. CNL is a nuclear technology center which has undergone renovation.

== History ==
Historically the Chalk River Laboratories was a nuclear power plant and advanced nuclear research facility. CNL began developing nuclear technology in the late 1940's and early 1950s. The government-owned company Atomic energy of Canada Limited (AECL) took over Chalk River Nuclear Laboratories in 1952, but today the site is operated through contractors such as CNL. Research at the site led to the development of the CANDU reactor. Other subjects of research included fuels, hydrogen production, storage and handling of radiation, and more recently alpha therapies medical isotope treatment for cancer. In 2014, Ontario became the first jurisdiction in North America to fully rely on nuclear power and renewable energies. In 2016 a $1.2 billion investment plan over ten years was which required required the decommissioning of 120 aged facilities and designing new centres was released by the Government of Canada.
