= Bullfrog Power =

Canadian renewable energy company

- Company type: Privately held
- Industry: Energy retailer
- Founded: 2005
- Headquarters: Toronto, Ontario, Canada
- Key people: Suha Jethalal (President), Tom Heintzman (co-founder), Greg Kiessling (co-founder)
- Products: Green energy
- Parent: Envest
- Website: www.bullfrogpower.com

Bullfrog Power, an Envest company, is a Canadian sustainability solutions provider operating in Canada. Bullfrog offers green electricity from renewable energy sources such as wind, solar, and low-impact hydro, as well as green natural gas, a renewable biogas product that serves as an alternative to fossil fuel-based natural gas, and carbon offsets. Bullfrog only sources electricity from generation sources that meet or exceed the federal government's Environmental Choice Program EcoLogo standard for renewable electricity. Bullfrog's green natural gas product is produced at facilities that have met environmental standards as defined by ICF International.

Across Canada, Bullfrog's electricity comes exclusively from wind, solar, and low-impact hydro facilities.

Less Emission is a subsidiary of Bullfrog "that works to limit the environmental impact of air travel–an important service for festivals and conferences across Canada."

== Operation ==
Bullfrog Power does not inject the green electricity, green natural gas, or green fuel directly into a customer's home or facility, as doing so would require building parallel energy distribution systems, which are observed to be neither environmentally nor financially sound.

Instead, Bullfrog ensures that the electricity being put onto the grid on its customers' behalf is from renewable sources. For every MWh of clean, renewable electricity that is produced and injected onto the grid by a green power generator, a corresponding Green Electricity Certificate (GEC) is created to represent the positive environmental benefits (such as emissions reductions) associated with producing that green power.

Bullfrog uses a customer's premium to secure and retire Green Electricity Certificates from wind, solar, or low-impact hydro generators on the customer's behalf. This entitles the customer to claim the green energy and associated emissions reductions.

Similar to the way its green electricity offering works, Bullfrog secures and retires Green Natural Gas Certificates on behalf of customers, enabling customers to claim the green energy and associated environmental benefits.

Bullfrog Power's sister company, Fewer Emissions Inc., provides CDM Gold Standard and VER+ Standard-certified carbon offsets.

== Customers and supporters ==
Bullfrog Power currently has thousands of residential and commercial customers. Well-known residential customers include Kristina Groves, Thomas Homer-Dixon, and Nino Ricci. Notable bullfrogpowered organizations include Unilever Canada, AutoShare, and Lake Ontario Waterkeeper.

A number of environmental organizations support Bullfrog Power's renewable energy, such as WWF-Canada, Evergreen, and the Pembina Institute.

== Transparency ==
Bullfrog Power is audited on an annual basis to confirm that as much green electricity and natural gas has been injected onto the system as its customers have used, and that it has retired all emissions credits related to customer contracts.

Bullfrog pioneered the concept of an annual audit for green electricity retailers when it launched in 2005.

== B Corporation status ==
In 2011, Bullfrog Power announced its certification as one of Canada's founding B Corporations by B Lab. Certified B Corporations meet higher standards of social and environmental performance, transparency, and accountability. Unlike traditional corporations, Certified B Corporations are legally required to consider the impact of their decisions on their employees, suppliers, community, consumers, and the environment.

In 2012, Bullfrog Power was named to B Corporation's "Best for the World" list under the category "Best for the Environment."

In 2013, Bullfrog Power was once again named to B Corporation's "Best for the World" list, this time under the category "Best for Environmental Impact."

In 2018, Bullfrog Power was recognized in the Environment, Workers, and Governance categories.
