= Canadian Neutron Beam Centre =

Canadian neutron facility

The NRC Canadian Neutron Beam Centre (CNBC) was Canada's national user facility that enabled researchers to use neutron beams as tools for world-class materials research. The CNBC was located at Chalk River Laboratories, where Atomic Energy of Canada Limited (AECL) owned and operated the National Research Universal (NRU) reactor that provided the neutrons for CNBC. CNBC was a global leader in the development of materials and products for businesses. Like most other neutron beam laboratories, the CNBC operated beamlines as a service to external researchers. In a typical year, about 250 individuals participated in research that relied on access to the suite of 6 beamlines at the CNBC.

The CNBC ceased to provide neutrons on March 31, 2018, when the NRU reactor permanently closed.

== History ==
The neutron beam laboratory known as Canadian Neutron Beam Centre was transferred from AECL to the National Research Council in 1997.

== Services & Products ==
The NRU reactor, closed in March 2018, was a multi-purpose research reactor that supported science and industry in three areas simultaneously:

1. It was Canada's only major neutron source, supplying neutrons for the CNBC.
2. It was Canada's only major materials testing reactor, supporting nuclear energy research and development.
3. It was one of the two largest global producers of medical radioisotopes.

== See also ==
- Canadian Light Source
