= Pool Test Reactor =

Retired Canadian nuclear reactor

Pool Test Reactor (PTR) was a 10 kWt ordinary (light) water moderated pool-type reactor fueled with highly enriched uranium built at Chalk River in 1957. It used 93% enriched uranium-aluminum plate-type fuel. The reactor, was used for burnup measurement of fissile samples from NRX. The reactor was designed and built by Canadair.

== History ==
On November 29, 1957 the reactor attained first criticality and shortly took over the function of ZEEP for measuring reactivity effects of materials, particularly after irradiation. It was shut down and defueled in 1990.
