= ZED-2 =

Nuclear research reactor in Ontario, Canada

ZED-2 (Zero Energy Deuterium) is a zero-power nuclear research reactor built at the Chalk River Laboratories in Ontario, Canada. It is the successor to the ZEEP reactor. Designed by AECL for CANDU reactor support, the unit saw first criticality on 7 September 1960. The reactor is still operating at Chalk River where it is used for reactor physics and nuclear fuel research.

== Description ==
The ZED-2 is a low-power (200 W), tank-type (3.36 metres [11.0 ft] diameter, 3.35 metres [11.0 ft] high), heavy-water moderated reactor capable of a peak flux of 10^{9} n/cm^{2}.s. Seven special Zirconium-alloy fuel assemblies are used and reactor control is via moderator level adjustment. Liquid (light or heavy water) and gas (CO_{2}) coolants can be used and be heated to 300 °C (572 °F) at 8.6 megapascals (1,250 psi) while the heavy water moderator can be heated or cooled independently of the coolant in the Zr assemblies.

ZED-2 has also been used for definitive studies of the effects of heavy water and alternative ordinary (light) water and organic coolants. Sufficient CANFLEX (43-element) bundles are being built containing SEU fuel to provide "full-core" simulation for the Advanced CANDU Reactor (ACR) project.

In November 2010, the American Nuclear Society officially honoured the ZED-2 reactor with the title of 'nuclear historic landmark', recognising its 50 years of service and many contributions in the field of nuclear research and technology.
