= Energy Alberta Corporation =

- Company type: Private
- Industry: Nuclear energy
- Founded: 2005
- Founder: Hank Swartout, Wayne Henuset
- Defunct: 2011
- Fate: Acquired by Bruce Power (2007)
- Headquarters: Calgary, Alberta, Canada
- Area served: Alberta, Canada
- Key people: Hank Swartout, Wayne Henuset
- Products: Nuclear power (proposed)
- Services: Energy supply

Energy Alberta Corporation was created in 2005 with a concept to provide nuclear power to the energy-intensive development of the oil sands resources in northern Alberta, Canada. The company was founded by Hank Swartout, CEO of Precision Drilling Corporation, and Wayne Henuset, co-owner of Willow Park Wines and Spirits in Calgary, Alberta. The company intended to build a nuclear plant on the shore of Lac Cardinal, 30 kilometres (19 mi) from Peace River, Alberta.

Its business plan was to build one or more twin-reactor ACR-1000 nuclear plants in partnership with Atomic Energy of Canada Limited to supply electrical energy to the rapidly growing demand of the Alberta electrical grid, influenced by announced new facilities for oil extraction from the Athabasca Oil Sands, oil upgrading facilities near Edmonton, and associated population and economic growth across Alberta.

Energy Alberta initially proposed to build their first plant at either Whitecourt (several hundred kilometres southwest of the oil sands) or Peace River (on the western part of the oil sands). Peace River local councils welcomed the project, and a site 30 km west of Peace River on Lac Cardinal was chosen in August, 2007 and an application to the Canadian Nuclear Safety Commission was filed.

In 2007 Energy Alberta was acquired by Bruce Power of Ontario. In March 2009, Bruce decided to relocate the site to Whitemud, a different site still within 30 km of Peace River.

As of October, 2007, the company had not announced the names of any oil sands companies interested in using its energy, or investors willing to provide the estimated $6.2 billion ($9.1 billion today) for construction of the first plant.

Present oil sands extraction plants use natural gas to supply heat to make hot water or steam used in the separation of oil and sand. Using nuclear power instead of burning gas would prevent the emission of large quantities of carbon dioxide. The direct use of heat from nuclear reactors has been found cost effective in an energy analysis. However, nuclear reactors have a lifetime of 50 years or more and cannot be moved so there is a problem supplying the heat where it is needed as nearby deposits are depleted. Energy Alberta appears to have no plans for using the heat directly; they plan to produce electricity which can easily be delivered anywhere. However, the cost of nuclear electricity is about 7 cents per kilowatt-hour when privately financed or more than $17 per gigajoule compared with $6 per gigajoule for natural gas. Rising costs for gas and carbon taxes could change that picture.

Some environmental groups oppose nuclear power in Alberta. A Pembina Institute opinion from 2007 argues that renewable sources of energy be used instead and mentions many problems associated with nuclear power including risk of devastating accident, radioactive waste, leaks, heat pollution, cost overruns and unreliable performance. See Nuclear Power. Nuclear facility emissions can be compared with the much higher radioactive emissions of coal-fired plants. However, as of June 2024 there are no coal-fired electricity plants operating in Alberta.

In March 2008, the Energy Alberta Corporation was purchased by Bruce Power.

Bruce Power announced in December 2011 that it will not go ahead with the nuclear power plant proposed for Peace River.
