= Pembina Institute =

Canadian energy think tank

- Founded: 1985, Drayton Valley, Alberta, Canada
- Purpose: Sustainable energy, Climate change, Oil sands
- Region served: Canada
- Method: Research, convening, communication
- Website: www.pembina.org

The Pembina Institute is a Canadian think tank and registered charity focused on energy. Founded in 1985, the institute has offices in Calgary, Edmonton, Toronto, Ottawa, and Vancouver. The institute's mission is to "advance a prosperous clean energy future for Canada through credible policy solutions that support communities, the economy and a safe climate."

== Origin ==
The Pembina Institute was formed following the 1981 Lodgepole sour gas accident in Alberta, which killed two people and polluted the air for weeks. A small group of rural Albertans came together to secure tougher regulations for drilling sour gas wells, and later went on to form the Pembina Institute.

== Policies ==
The Pembina Institute advocates policies that reduce the use of fossil fuels, and supports the transition to cleaner energy sources.

The institute's current work is regionally focused. In Alberta they call for restricting energy development (conventional and unconventional oil and gas as well as oil sands) to limits supported by science. They promote renewable energy sources including wind and solar, and advocate shutting down coal-fired electricity plants. They support energy efficiency policies and actions in communities and businesses, and improved building efficiency. They have called for expanding transit infrastructure and limiting urban sprawl in the Greater Toronto Area. They have supported the carbon tax in British Columbia and in Alberta, and called for stronger climate action from the Canadian federal government, including action on reducing methane emissions. They have analyzed the impact of freight emissions on Paris Accord targets, stating that the targets will not be met if freight transportation is not made more efficient.

== Initiatives ==
The institute set up the "Business Renewables Centre - Canada" in 2018, with a mandate as "an education platform and community where organizations can learn how to buy their electricity from renewable sources."

The Pembina Institute was also involved in the "Renewable is Doable" initiative with WWF-Canada to replace coal and nuclear power with clean energy sources.

The institute is a member of the Alberta Energy Efficiency Alliance. It is also a supporting member of the Strathmere group, an assembly of the heads of eleven of Canada's leading environmental organizations.

The institute's educational initiatives were moved to an independent organization, Green Learning Canada, in 2011.

== Intervener standing ==
In 2012, Alberta Environment and Sustainable Resource Development denied the institute standing to express concerns about an in situ oilsands project near Fort McMurray, Alberta. The decision was appealed, and on October 1, 2013, the decision was overturned by the Alberta Court of Queen's Bench.

== Funding ==
The Pembina Institute is primarily funded by a range of project-specific grants, event sponsorships (including those from energy companies such as Suncor, Shell and Bullfrog Power) and individual donations. The institute also performs fee-for-service research and advising to government and industry.
