= ZEEP =

Historic Canadian nuclear reactor for the production of Plutonium

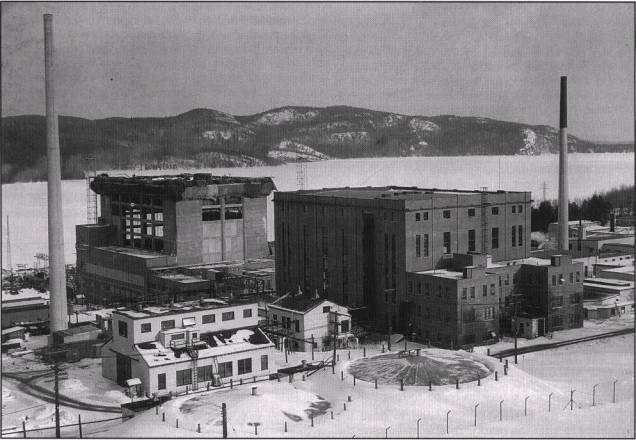
NRX and ZEEP buildings, Chalk River Laboratories, 1945. The Ottawa River is behind the reactor buildings.

The ZEEP (Zero Energy Experimental Pile) reactor was a nuclear reactor built at the Chalk River Laboratories near Chalk River, Ontario, Canada (which superseded the Montreal Laboratory for nuclear research in Canada). ZEEP first went critical at 15:45 on September 5, 1945. ZEEP was the first operational nuclear reactor outside the United States.

== History ==
The reactor was designed by Canadian, British and French scientists as a part of an effort to produce plutonium for nuclear weapons during World War II. It was developed while the Montreal Laboratory and Chalk River Laboratories research facility were under the supervision of the National Research Council of Canada (NRC). ZEEP was instrumental in the development of the NRX and NRU reactors, which led to the development of the successful CANDU reactor. ZEEP was used to test reactivity effects and other physics parameters needed for reactor development at Chalk River Laboratories, including fuel lattices for the NRU reactor situated next door. Its basic design was used by many other countries in initiating their own nuclear research programs.

ZEEP was the world's second heavy water reactor, following Chicago Pile-3 in May 1944, and it was also designed to use natural (unenriched) uranium; a feature carried through to the CANDU design. Uranium enrichment is a complex and expensive process; thus, the ability to use unenriched uranium gave ZEEP and its descendants a number of distinct advantages.

ZEEP continued to be used for basic research until 1970. It was decommissioned in 1973 and dismantled in 1997. In 1966 ZEEP was designated a historic site by Ontario, and commemorated with a historic plaque. Both this plaque and ZEEP itself are now on display at the Canada Science and Technology Museum in Ottawa, Canada.

== See also ==
- Science and technology in Canada
- CANDU reactor
- Heavy water reactor
- AECL
- List of nuclear reactors
