= National Research Universal reactor =

Retired research nuclear reactor in Canada

Coordinates: 46°3′15.53″N 77°21′52.12″W

The National Research Universal (NRU) reactor was a 135 MW nuclear research reactor built in the Chalk River Laboratories, Ontario, one of Canada's national science facilities. It was a multipurpose science facility that served three main roles. It generated radionuclides used to treat or diagnose over 20 million people in 80 countries every year (and, to a lesser extent, other isotopes used for non-medical purposes). It was the neutron source for the NRC Canadian Neutron Beam Centre: a materials research centre that grew from the Nobel Prize-winning work of Bertram Brockhouse. It was the test bed for Atomic Energy of Canada Limited to develop fuels and materials for the CANDU reactor. At the time of its retirement on March 31, 2018, it was the world's oldest operating nuclear reactor.

== History ==
The NRU reactor design was started in 1949. It is fundamentally a Canadian design, significantly advanced from NRX. It was built as the successor to the NRX reactor at the Atomic Energy Project of the National Research Council of Canada at Chalk River Laboratories. The NRX reactor was the world's most intense source of neutrons when it started operation in 1947. It was not known how long a research reactor could be expected to operate, so the management of Chalk River Laboratories began planning the NRU reactor to ensure continuity of the research programs.

NRU started self-sustained operation (or went "critical") on November 3, 1957, a decade after the NRX, and was ten times more powerful. It was initially designed as a 200 MW reactor, fueled with natural uranium. NRU was converted to 60 MW with highly-enriched uranium (HEU) fuel in 1964 and converted a third time in 1991 to 135 MW running on low-enriched uranium (LEU) fuel.

On Saturday, 24 May 1958 the NRU suffered a major accident. A damaged uranium fuel rod caught fire and was torn in two as it was being removed from the core. The fire was extinguished, but a sizeable quantity of radioactive combustion products had contaminated the interior of the reactor building and, to a lesser degree, an area of the surrounding laboratory site. The clean-up and repair took three months. NRU was operating again in August 1958. Care was taken to ensure no one was exposed to dangerous levels of radiation and staff involved in clean-up were monitored over the following decades. A corporal named Bjarnie Hannibal Paulson who was at the clean up developed unusual skin cancers and received a disability pension.

NRU's calandria, the vessel which contains its nuclear reactions, is made of aluminum, and was replaced in 1971 because of corrosion. The calandria has not been replaced since, although a second replacement is likely needed. An advantage of NRU's design is that it can be taken apart to allow for upgrade and repair.

In October 1986, the NRU reactor was recognized as a nuclear historic landmark by the American Nuclear Society. Since NRX was decommissioned in 1992, after 45 years of service, there has been no backup for NRU.

In 1994, Bertram Brockhouse was awarded the Nobel Prize in Physics, for his pioneering work carried out in the NRX and NRU reactors in the 1950s. He gave birth to a scientific technique which is now used around the world.

In 1996, AECL informed the Canadian Nuclear Safety Commission (then known as the Atomic Energy Control Board) that operation of the NRU reactor would not continue beyond December 31, 2005. It was expected that a replacement facility would be built inside that time. However, no replacement was built and in 2003, AECL advised the CNSC that they intended to continue operation of the NRU reactor beyond December 2005. The operating licence was initially extended to July 31, 2006, and a 63-month licence renewal was obtained in July 2006, allowing operation of the NRU until October 31, 2011.

In May 2007, the NRU set a new record for the production of medical isotopes.

In June 2007, a new neutron scattering instrument was opened in NRU. The D3 Neutron Reflectometer is designed for examining surfaces, thin films and interfaces. The technique of Neutron Reflectometry is capable of providing unique information on materials in the nanometre length scale.

=== 2007 shutdown ===
On November 18, 2007, the NRU reactor was shut down for routine maintenance. This shutdown was voluntarily extended when AECL decided to install seismically qualified emergency power systems (EPS) to two of the reactor's cooling pumps (in addition to the AC and DC backup power systems already in place), as required as part of its August 2006 operating license extension by the Canadian Nuclear Safety Commission (CNSC). This resulted in a worldwide shortage of radioisotopes for medical treatments because AECL had not pre-arranged for an alternate supply. On December 11, 2007, the House of Commons of Canada, acting on what the government described as "independent expert" advice, passed emergency legislation authorizing the restarting of the NRU reactor with one of the two seismic connections complete (one pump being sufficient to cool the core), and authorizing the reactor's operation for 120 days without CNSC approval. The legislation, C-38, was passed by the Senate and received Royal Assent on December 12. Prime Minister Stephen Harper accused the "Liberal-appointed" CNSC for this shutdown which "jeopardized the health and safety of tens of thousands of Canadians". Others viewed the actions and priorities of the Prime Minister and government in terms of protecting the eventual sale of AECL to private investors. The government later announced plans to sell part of AECL in May 2009.

The NRU reactor was restarted on December 16, 2007.

On January 29, 2008, the former President of the CNSC, Linda Keen, testified before a Parliamentary Committee that the risk of fuel failure in the NRU reactor was "1 in 1000 years", and claimed this to be a thousand times greater risk than the "international standard". These claims were refuted by AECL.

On February 2, 2008, the second seismic connection was complete. This timing was well within the above 120-day window afforded by Bill C-38.

=== 2009 Shutdown ===
In mid-May 2009 a heavy water leak at the base of the reactor vessel was detected, prompting a temporary shutdown of the reactor. The leak was estimated to be 5 kg (<5 litres) per hour, a result of corrosion. This was the second heavy water leak since late 2008. The reactor was defuelled and drained of all of its heavy water moderator. No administrative levels of radioactivity were exceeded, during the leak or defuelling, and all leaked water was contained and treated on site.

The reactor remained shut down until August 2010. The lengthy shutdown was necessary to defuel the reactor, ascertain the full extent of the corrosion to the vessel, and finally to effect the repairs — all with remote and restricted access from a minimum distance of 8 metres due to the residual radioactive fields in the reactor vessel. The 2009 shutdown occurred at a time when only one of the other four worldwide regular medical isotope sourcing reactors was producing, resulting in a worldwide shortage.

=== Decommissioning ===
On March 31, 2018, following government direction to shut down operations, NRU was permanently shut down ahead of decommissioning scheduled to start in 2028.

== Production of isotopes ==
Atoms are the building blocks of nature. The periodic table of the elements lists as many as 118 different types of atom, called elements, such as hydrogen, nitrogen or carbon. Atoms of any element can occur in more than one weight, depending on the number of neutrons they contain. Two atoms of carbon for instance may weigh 12 and 13 a.m.u. They are both carbon atoms, but one has an extra neutron. They are referred to as isotopes of carbon.

Not all isotopes are stable. An unstable isotope will decay to a more stable state, releasing energy and possibly one or more particles. These particles and/or the energy emitted by said radioisotopes is used in a great variety of medical, industrial and scientific applications.

With the construction of the earlier NRX reactor, it was possible for the first time to commercially manufacture isotopes that were not commonly found in nature. In the core of an operating reactor there are billions of free neutrons. By inserting a piece of target material into the core, atoms in the target can capture some of those neutrons and become heavier isotopes. Manufacturing medical isotopes was a Canadian medical innovation in the early 1950s.

The NRU reactor continued the legacy of NRX and until it was decommissioned March 31, 2018 produced more medical isotopes than any facility in the world.

- Cobalt-60 from NRU is used in radiation therapy machines that treat cancer in 15 million patients in 80 countries each year. The NRU produced about 75% of the global supply. The decay of Cobalt-60 results in the emission of high energy photons.
- Technetium-99m from NRU used in the diagnosis of 5 million patients each year represented about 80 per cent of all nuclear medicine procedures. The NRU produced over half of the world's total supply. Technetium-99m emits less energy as it decays than most gamma emitters, roughly as much as the X-rays from an X-ray tube. This can act as an in situ source for a special camera that creates an image of the patient called a SPECT scan. NRU actually produced the more stable parent isotope, molybdenum-99, which is shipped to medical labs. There it decays into technetium-99m, which is separated and used for testing.
- NRU produced xenon-133, iodine-131 and iodine-125, which are used in a variety of diagnostic and therapeutic applications.
- Carbon-14 produced in NRU was sold to chemistry, bioscience and environmental labs where it is used as a tracer.
- Iridium-192 from NRU is used in several industries to inspect welds or other metal components to ensure they are safe for use.

The core of the NRU reactor was about 3 metres (9.8 ft) wide and 3 metres (9.8 ft) high, which is unusually large for a research reactor. That large volume enabled the bulk production of isotopes. Other research reactors in the world produce isotopes for medical and industrial uses, for example the European High Flux Reactor at Petten in the Netherlands, Maria Reactor in Poland, and the OPAL reactor in Australia which began operation in April 2007.

NRU was originally scheduled to shut down in October 2016. With no stable isotope manufacturer ready to step in until 2018, the Canadian Government allowed the NRU to produce Isotopes until March 2018.

== Neutron beam research ==
The NRU reactor is home to Canada's national facility for neutron scattering: the NRC Canadian Neutron Beam Centre. Neutron scattering is a technique where a beam of neutrons shines through a sample of material, and depending on how the neutrons scatter from the atoms inside, scientists can determine many details about the crystal structure and movements of the atoms within the sample.

An early pioneer of the technique was Bertram Brockhouse who built some of the early neutron spectrometers in the NRX and NRU reactors and was awarded the 1994 Nobel Prize in physics for the development of neutron spectroscopy.

The NRC Canadian Neutron Beam Centre continues that field of science today, operating as an open-access user facility allowing scientists from across Canada and around the world to use neutrons in their research programs.

It is common for a developed country to support a national facility for neutron scattering and one for X-ray scattering. The two types of facility provide complementary information about materials.

An unusual feature of the NRU reactor as Canada's national neutron source is its multipurpose design: able to manufacture isotopes, and support nuclear R&D at the same time as it supplies neutrons to the suite of neutron scattering instruments.

The NRU reactor is sometimes (incorrectly) characterized as simply a nuclear research facility. Neutron scattering however is not nuclear research, it is materials research. Neutrons are an ideal probe of materials including metals, alloys, biomaterials, ceramics, magnetic materials, minerals, polymers, composites, glasses, nano-materials and many others. The neutron scattering instruments at the NRC Canadian Neutron Beam Centre are used by universities and industries from across Canada every year because knowledge of materials is important for innovation in many sectors.

== Nuclear power research and development ==
Inside the core of a large electricity-producing reactor like a CANDU or a PWR, there are a great many free neutrons and high levels of gamma radiation from the nuclear fission process. It is important for engineers and scientists to understand how that environment will affect the materials that the reactor is made from. That knowledge is needed to design a reactor with a long service-life.

The NRU reactor has test facilities built into its core that can replicate conditions inside a large electricity-producing reactor. NRU itself does not generate steam (or electricity); its cooling water heats up to approximately 55 degrees Celsius. Inside the test facilities though, high temperatures and pressures can be produced. It is essential to test out different materials before they are used in the construction of a nuclear generating station.

The fundamental knowledge gained from NRU enabled the development of the CANDU reactor, and is the foundation for the Canadian nuclear industry.

== See also ==
- Nuclear fission
- Neutron scattering
- Nuclear power
- Nuclear waste
- Nuclear power in Canada
