= NRX =

Retired research nuclear reactor

Coordinates: 46°03′06″N 77°21′49″W

NRX (National Research Experimental) was a heavy-water-moderated, light-water-cooled, nuclear research reactor at the Canadian Chalk River Laboratories, which came into operation in 1947 at a design power rating of 10 MW (thermal), increasing to 42 MW by 1954. It was Canada's most expensive science facility and the world's most powerful nuclear research reactor at its construction. NRX was remarkable for its heat output and the number of free neutrons it generated. In the late 1940s, the NRX reactor had the highest neutron flux in the world: 10–20 times that of a graphite reactor of comparable power, due to its small physical size made possible by the use of a heavy water moderator.

NRX experienced the world's first major reactor accident outside of Russia on 12 December 1952. The reactor began operation on 22 July 1947 under the National Research Council of Canada and was taken over by Atomic Energy of Canada Limited (AECL) shortly before the 1952 accident. The accident was cleaned up, and the reactor was restarted within two years. NRX operated for 45 years, then shut down permanently on 30 March 1993. Decommissioning is underway at the Chalk River Laboratories site.

NRX was the successor to Canada's first reactor, ZEEP. Because the operating life of a research reactor was not expected to be very long, in 1948, planning started for the construction of a successor facility, the National Research Universal reactor, which started self-sustained operation (or "went critical") in 1957.

== Design ==
Two main processes govern a heavy water-moderated reactor. First, the water slows down (moderates) the neutrons which are produced by nuclear fission, increasing the chances of the high energy neutrons causing further fission reactions. Second, control rods absorb neutrons and adjust the power level or shut down the reactor in the course of regular operation. Inserting the control rods or removing the heavy water moderator can stop the reaction.

The NRX reactor incorporated a calandria, a sealed vertical aluminium cylindrical vessel with a diameter of 8.75 feet (2.667 m) and height of 10.5 feet (3.20 m). The calandria vessel held 198 calandria tubes with inside diameter 2-1/4" (57.15 mm) connected to the top and bottom tube sheets in a hexagonal lattice. The calandria contained approximately 3,300 US gallons (12,491 litres) heavy water, and the uranium fuel load was 10.5 short tons (9,525 kg). A helium cover gas was used to vent the heavy water system and to carry gaseous activation products to a recombiner system. Air could not be used as a cover gas, as its irradiation would result in production of corrosive nitric acid. The heavy water level in the reactor could be adjusted to help set the power level. Fuel elements or experimental items were sitting in the vertical tubes and surrounded by air. This design was a forerunner of the CANDU reactors.

The fuel elements contained fuel rods 120.5 inches (3.060m) long, with the fuel segment 1.360 in (34.54 mm) diameter, with an outer aluminum fuel sheath diameter between 1.66-1.74 inches (42.16-44.20 mm) depending on the fuel rod type. Surrounding the fuel elements were aluminum coolant tubes, collectively carrying up to 3,500 imperial gallons (15,900 litres) of cooling water from the Ottawa River flowing through them. An air flowrate of 70,000 lb/hour (32,000 kg/hour) was used to cool the graphite reflector shields, by flowing through the space between the inner and outer reflectors (known as the J-rod annulus).

Twelve of the vertical tubes contained control rods made of boron carbide powder inside steel tubes. These could be raised and lowered to control the reaction, with any seven inserted being enough to absorb sufficient neutrons that no chain reaction could happen. The rods were held up by electromagnets so that a power failure would cause them to fall into the tubes and terminate the reaction. A pneumatic system could use air pressure from above to quickly force them into the reactor core or from below to slowly raise them from it. Four were called the safeguard bank while the other eight were controlled in an automatic sequence.

== History ==
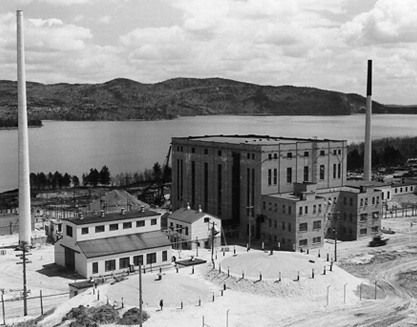
NRX and Zeep buildings 1945

NRX was for a time the world's most powerful research reactor, vaulting Canada into the forefront of physics research. Emerging from a World War II cooperative effort between Britain, the United States, and Canada, NRX was a multipurpose research reactor used to develop new isotopes, test materials and fuels, and produce neutron radiation beams, that became an indispensable tool in the blossoming field of condensed matter physics.

The nuclear physics design of NRX emerged from the Montreal Laboratory of Canada's National Research Council, which was established at the University of Montreal during WWII to engage a team of Canadian, British, and other European scientists in top-secret heavy-water reactor research. When the decision was made to build the NRX at what is now known as Chalk River Laboratories, the detailed engineering design was contracted to Canada's Defence Industries Limited (DIL), who subcontracted construction to Fraser Brace Ltd.

In the early days of cancer radiation therapy, the NRX reactor was the world's only source of the isotope cobalt-60, first used to bombard tumours in 1951.

In 1994, Dr. Bertram Brockhouse shared the Nobel Prize in Physics for his work in the 1950s at NRX, which advanced the detection and analysis techniques used in the field of neutron scattering for condensed matter research.

Based on this design, the CIRUS reactor was built in India. It was ultimately used to produce plutonium for India's Operation Smiling Buddha nuclear test.

== Accident ==
On 12 December 1952, the NRX reactor suffered a partial meltdown due to operator error and mechanical problems in the shut-off systems. For test purposes, some fuel channels had been disconnected from high-pressure water cooling and were connected by hoses to a temporary cooling system; one low-power channel was cooled only by airflow.

During tests at low power, with low coolant flux through the core, the supervisor noticed several control rods being pulled from the core; an operator in the basement had incorrectly opened pneumatic valves. The wrongly-opened valves were immediately closed, but some control rods did not reenter the core and were stuck in almost withdrawn positions, but still low enough for their status lights to indicate them as lowered. Due to a miscommunication between the supervisor and the control room operator, the wrong buttons were pressed when the supervisor asked to lower the control rods into the core. Instead of sealing the withdrawn control rods to the pneumatic system, the safeguard bank of four control rods was accidentally withdrawn from the core. The operator noticed that the power level was exponentially increasing, doubling every 2 seconds, and tripped the reactor. However, three safeguard control rods were not inserted into the core, and the fourth took an abnormally long time, about 90 seconds, to insert while the power kept rising. After just 10 seconds, the core reached 17 MW(thermal). The cooling water boiled in some tubes connected to the temporary cooling system, and some of them ruptured; the positive void coefficient of the reactor led to a further power increase. About 14 seconds later, valves were manually opened to drain the heavy water moderator from the calandria. As this took some time to become effective, power increased for five more seconds, peaked at an estimated 100 MW, then went down as the moderator level decreased and was at zero 25 seconds later. The accident, from low to high to zero power, took about 108 seconds. Meanwhile, some fuel elements melted and were pierced in several places; the helium cover gas leaked, and the air was aspirated inside. Hydrogen and other gases evolved by radiation-induced cooling water dissociation; 3–4 minutes later, oxyhydrogen exploded in the calandria. During the incident, some gaseous fission products were vented to the atmosphere, and heavy water in the calandria was contaminated with the cooling water and the fission products.

To remove the fuel decay heat, the water cooling system was kept operating, leaking contaminated coolant to the reactor basement. About 10 kilocuries (400 TBq) of radioactive materials, contained in about 4,500 cubic metres (1,200,000 US gal) of water, collected in the basement of the reactor building during the next few days.

Clean-up of the reactor building required several months of work, assisted by 150 US Navy personnel after Admiral Rickover requested permission to send US nuclear submarine personnel to learn about cleaning up nuclear contamination. The US contingent included future US president Jimmy Carter, at the time a lieutenant in the US nuclear submarine program who was in charge of 12 men. The NRX reactor core and calandria, damaged beyond repair, were removed and buried, and an improved replacement was installed; the refurbished reactor started operating 14 months and 5 days after the accident. The clean up was primarily performed by 850 Atomic Energy of Canada staff, assisted by about 170 Canadian and 150 US military personnel, and 20 contractors.

The lessons learned in the 1952 accident advanced the field of reactor safety significantly, and the concepts it highlighted (diversity and independence of safety systems, guaranteed shutdown capability, efficiency of man-machine interface) became fundamentals of reactor design. The incident was the world's first severe nuclear reactor accident.

== See also ==
- Chicago Pile-1
- Nuclear power
- Nuclear fission
- Nuclear power plant
- Nuclear waste
