= History of electricity sector in Canada =

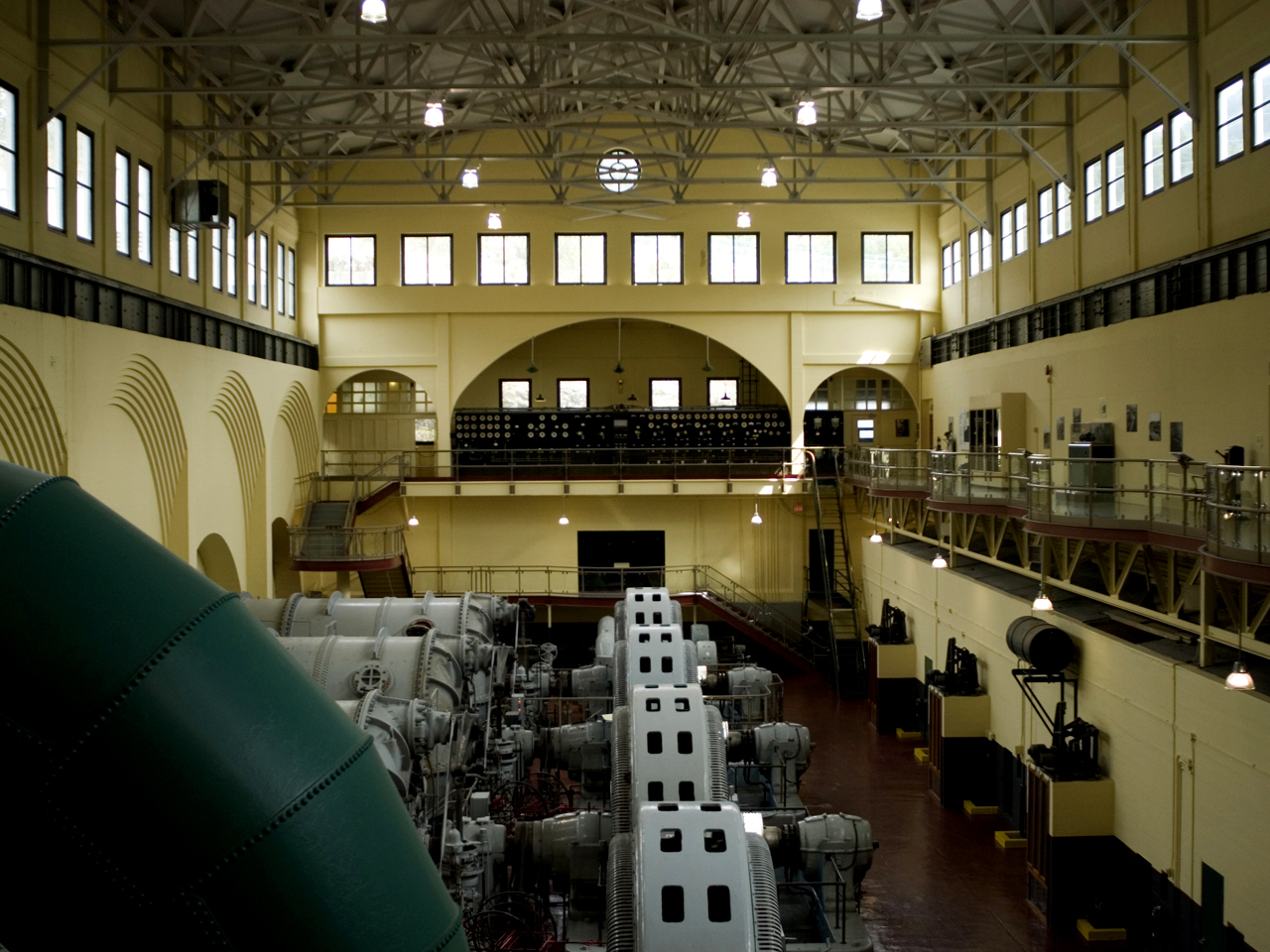
The 1911 Stave Falls powerhouse in British Columbia.

The history of electricity sector in Canada has played a significant role in the economic and political life of the country since wide-scale industrial and commercial power services spread across the country in the 1880s. The development of hydropower in the early 20th century has profoundly affected the economy and the political life in Canada and has come to symbolize the transition from "old " industrialism of the 19th century to a "new", modern and diversified, Canadian economy.

As early as 1873, an electric arc light was demonstrated in Winnipeg Manitoba. But Canada's use of electricity as mass-market service began in earnest in 1881, when Ottawa entrepreneur Thomas Ahearn installed Canada's first water-powered generator at the Chaudiere Falls, and later that year a steam generator lit a public skating rink in downtown Toronto. By 1883, the Houses of Parliament and Toronto's Central National Exhibition were illuminated by electric lights. And by 1885, public street lighting had been introduced in many Canadian Cities, including Hamilton, Quebec, Montreal, and Ottawa - which became the first city in the world to electrically light all of its streets.

In the 1890s, three competing firms in Ontario engaged in a competition to develop the Canadian side of Niagara Falls. After several years of delays, construction began on the two sites in 1902 and on a third in 1904. At the same time, a group of municipalities in southern Ontario set up utilities joined their efforts to obtain a stable supply of hydropower. Despite his initial reluctance, Ontario Premier George William Ross organized the Ontario Power Commission in 1903 to coordinate efforts.

After the private companies refused to negotiate power deals, the government responded by setting up an enquiry headed by Adam Beck, who recommended the establishment of a publicly owned distribution system. The province established the Hydro Electric Commission of Ontario in 1906 and voters approved municipalization of power distribution a year later. The Commission began delivering power to cities and towns in October 1910. By World War I, 59,000 customers were connected to the grid in Ontario.

In Manitoba and British Columbia, private companies were also quick to develop hydropower. The Nelson Electric Light Company was the first company to build a hydro site in British Columbia. February 1, 1896 it commenced operation producing power for the City of Nelson. The Sandon plant was second in March 1897. In Winnipeg, railroad tycoon William Mackenzie built the first plant built on the Winnipeg River to supply the Ogilvie mill. Mackenzie soon faced competition from the city of Winnipeg, after voters backed the construction of a $3.25 million publicly funded dam on the Winnipeg River in 1906.

== State control and rural electrification ==
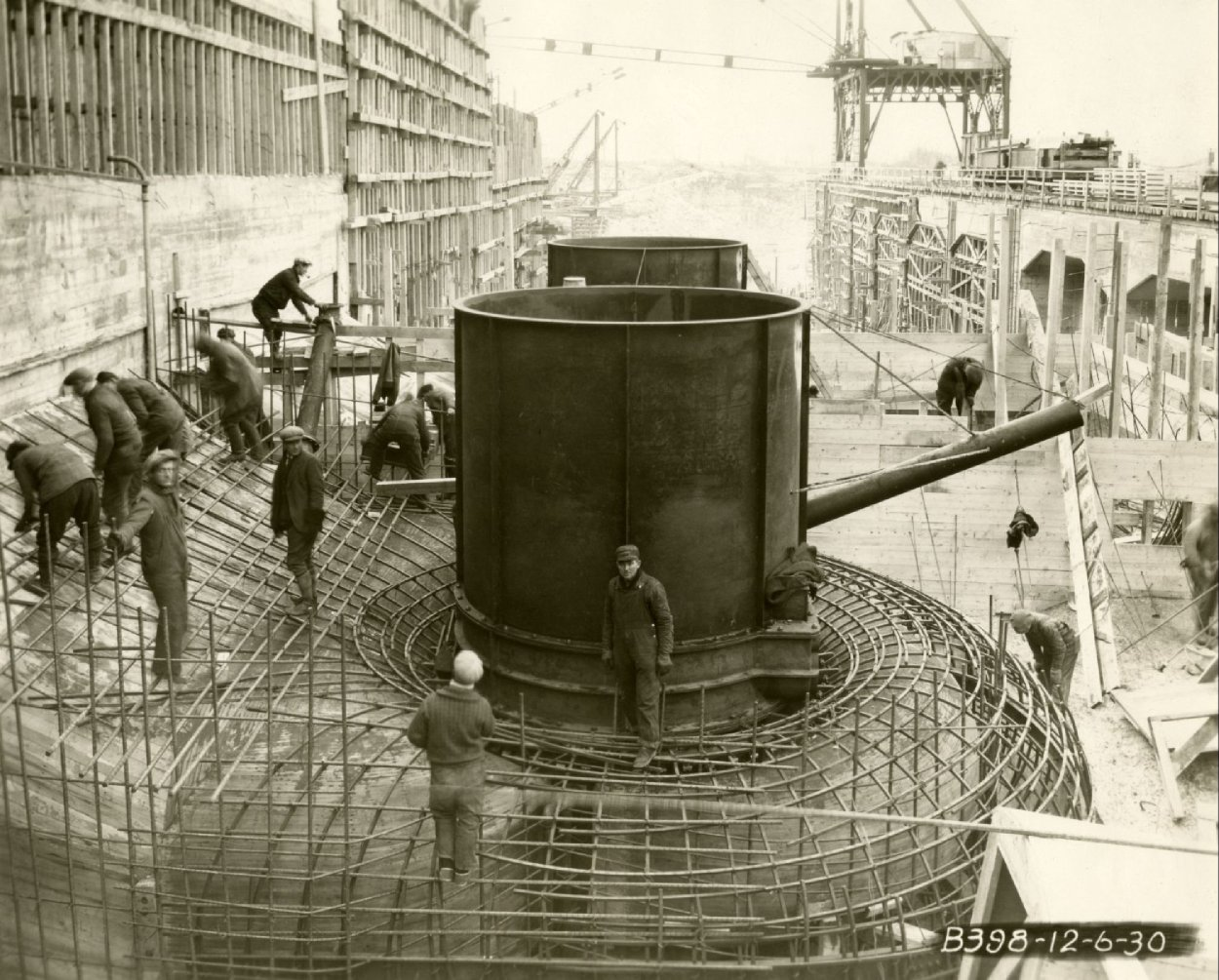
Construction of the first phase of the Beauharnois generating station, in 1930.

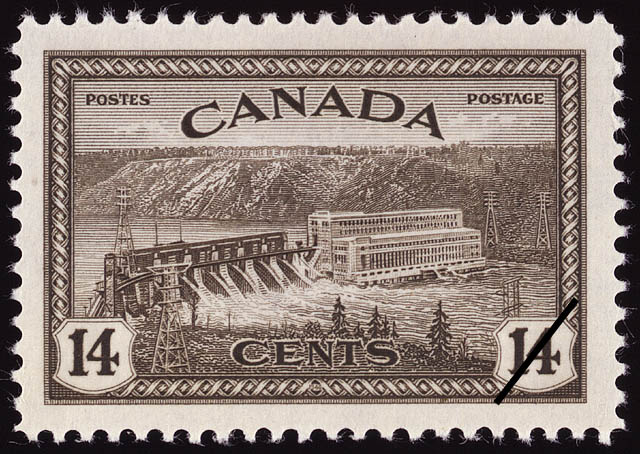
A 1946 postage stamp, featuring hydroelectricity.

Development of the electric sector accelerated after the First World War with the creation of provincial utilities in Nova Scotia, New Brunswick, Manitoba, Saskatchewan and British Columbia, in the 1920s. Publicly owned electric companies put a strong focus on rural electrification and hydroelectric development.

The Quebec government was a latecomer as far as its involvement in the electricity sector is concerned. After an anarchic period, the industry consolidated into a duopoly of investor-owned utilities. In Quebec's largest city, Montreal Light, Heat & Power (MLH&P) became the dominant player through mergers with competitors.

In the rest of the province, Shawinigan Water & Power Company (SW&P) attracted large industrial customers, aluminium smelters, carbide plants and pulp and paper mills, with an hydroelectric complex built on the Saint-Maurice River. In 1930, SW&P had grown to become the leading power company in Quebec, and one of the largest hydroelectric companies in the world.

Calls for nationalization of the industry began during the Great Depression, after a political scandal surrounded the construction of the Beauharnois Hydroelectric Power Station, on the Saint Lawrence River, west of Montreal. Critics attacked the "electricity trust" for their abusive rates and excessive profits. The campaign, masterminded by Philippe Hamel and T.-D. Bouchard, led to the nationalization of MLH&P and the creation of Hydro-Québec by the liberal government of Adélard Godbout in 1944. The other electric companies were taken over by Hydro-Québec in 1963, following a snap election on the issue of electricity spearheaded by René Lévesque, the provincial minister in charge of Natural Resources in the Jean Lesage government.

== Hydroelectric developments ==
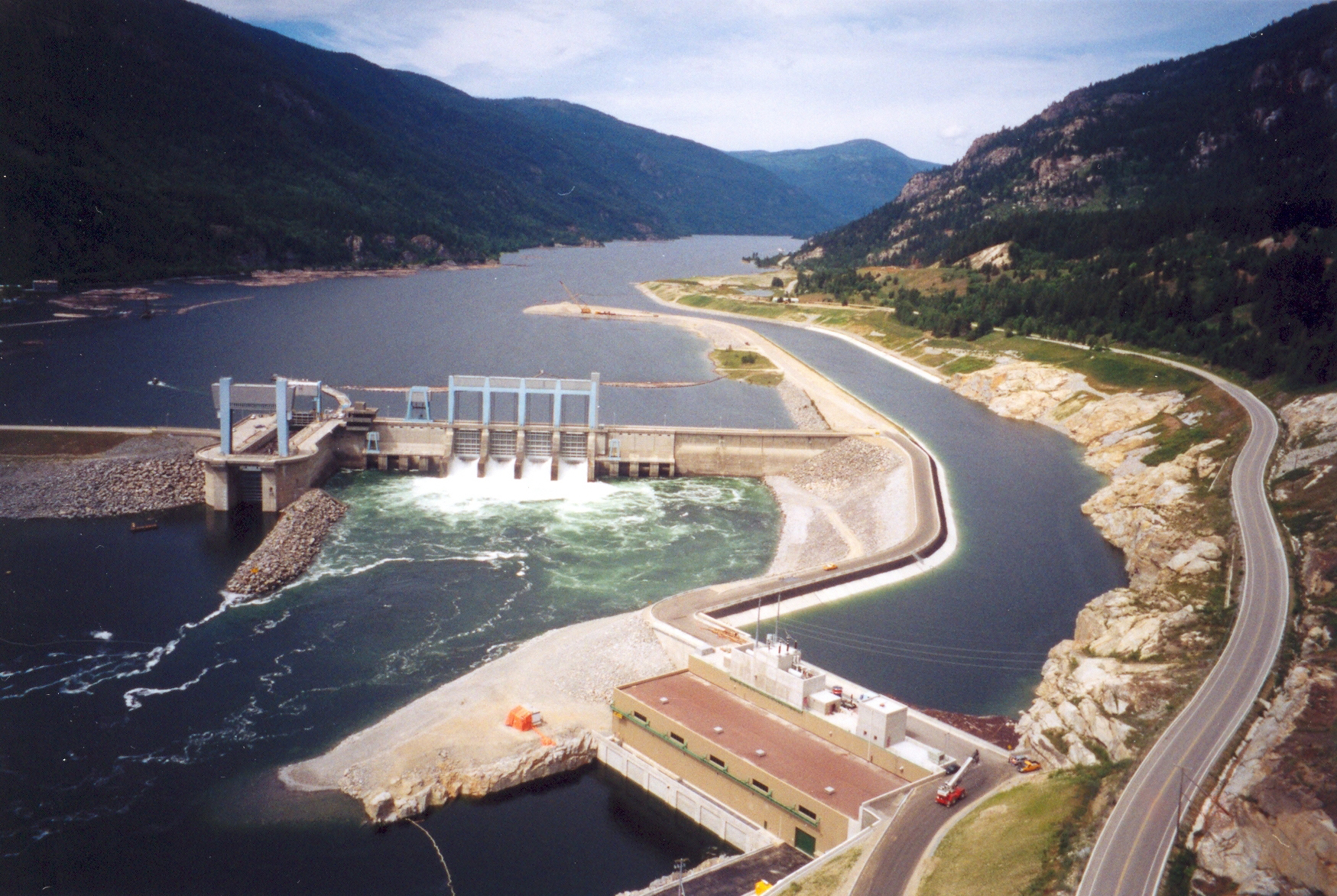
The Hugh Keenleyside Dam was built in the 1960s to fulfil Canada's obligations under the Columbia River Treaty. A 185-MW generating station was added in 2002.

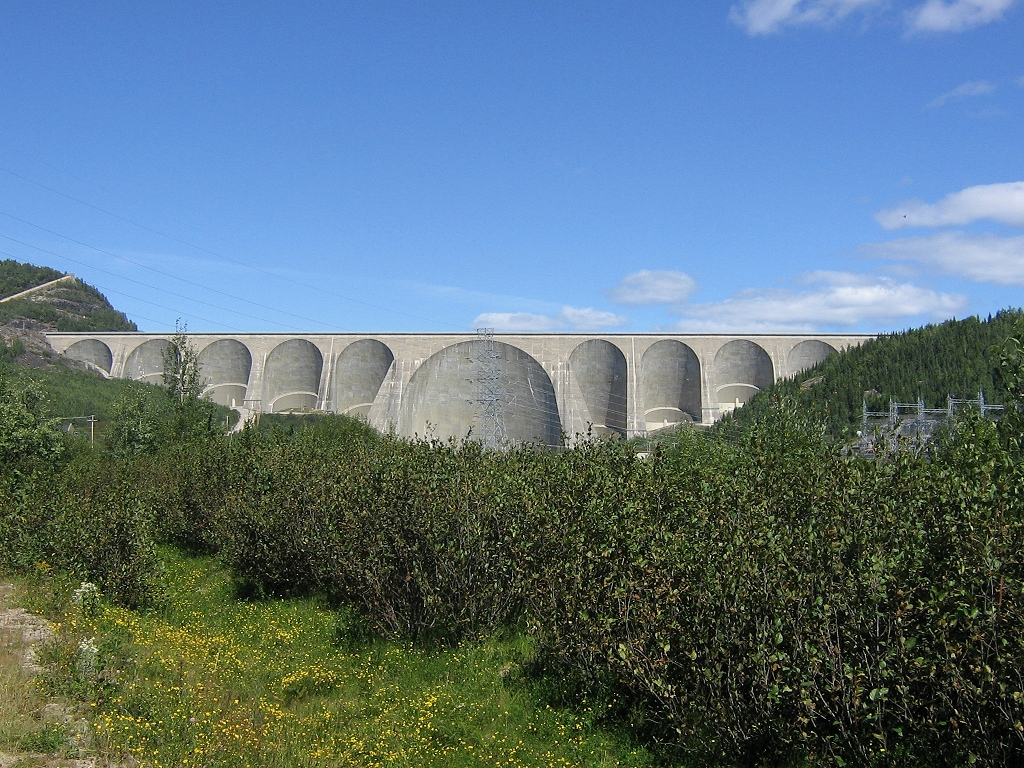
Hydro-Québec's Daniel-Johnson Dam (1968) is the largest multiple-arch buttress dam in the world.

Under government leadership, provincial power companies invested heavily in the power sector to stimulate economic development. Premiers Joey Smallwood in Newfoundland, W. A. C. Bennett in British Columbia, Ed Schreyer in Manitoba and Robert Bourassa in Quebec shared this vision of hydropower as a major part of their provinces' industrial development policies.

Hydroelectric mega-projects were undertaken by most provinces during the 1960s and 1970s. BC Hydro developed power stations along the Peace and Columbia rivers. Manitoba Hydro undertook the Nelson River Hydroelectric Project. In Labrador, the controversial Churchill Falls Generating Station was built after 20 years of negotiations, and NB Power undertook the construction of the Mactaquac Dam, near Fredericton.

But hydroelectric development was most active in Quebec. Between 1965 and 1984, Hydro-Québec built 7 large power stations on the Manicouagan and Outardes rivers and the first 3 plants of the 16,000-MW James Bay Project on La Grande River. The 5 plants of the second phase were built between 1987 and 1996.

But ample supply and increased opposition to large hydroelectric projects by environmentalists and First Nations forced the postponement or cancellation of several proposed developments during the 1980s and 1990s, such as the Site C dam on the Peace River in British Columbia or the Great Whale project in Quebec.

== Nuclear energy ==
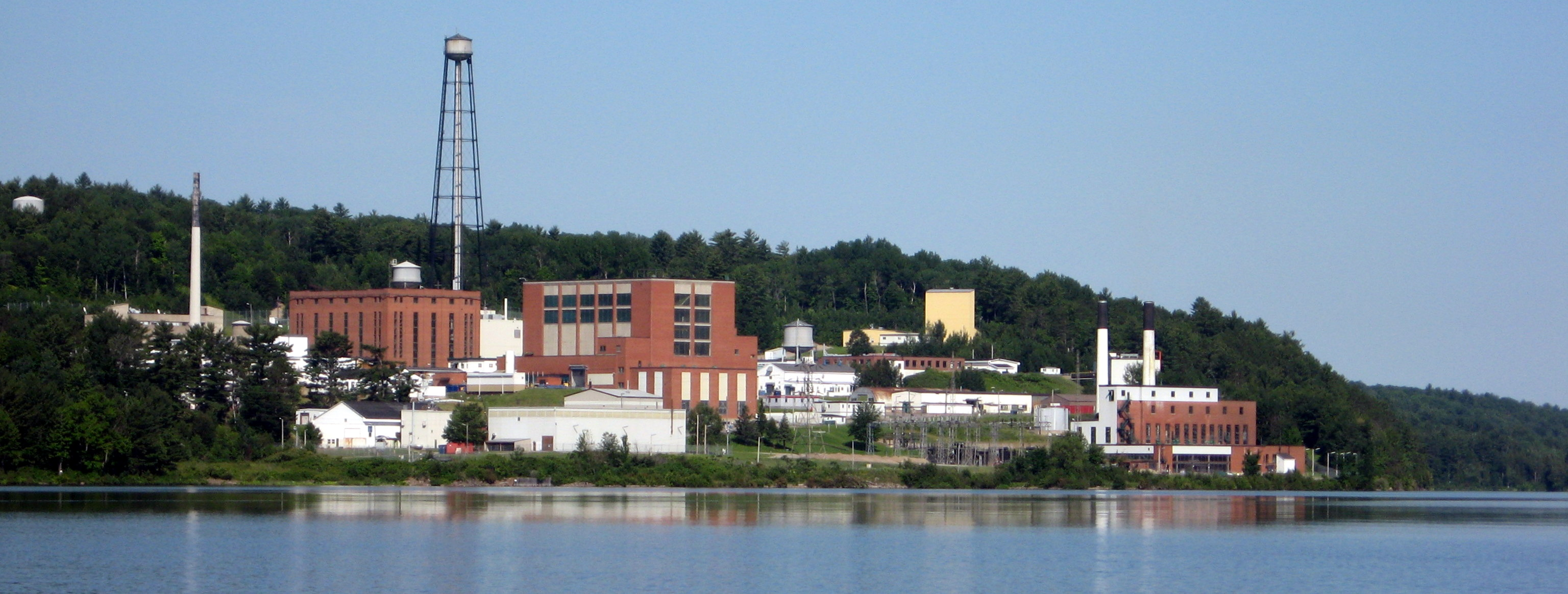
Chalk River Laboratories, on the Ottawa River, in Chalk River, Ontario.

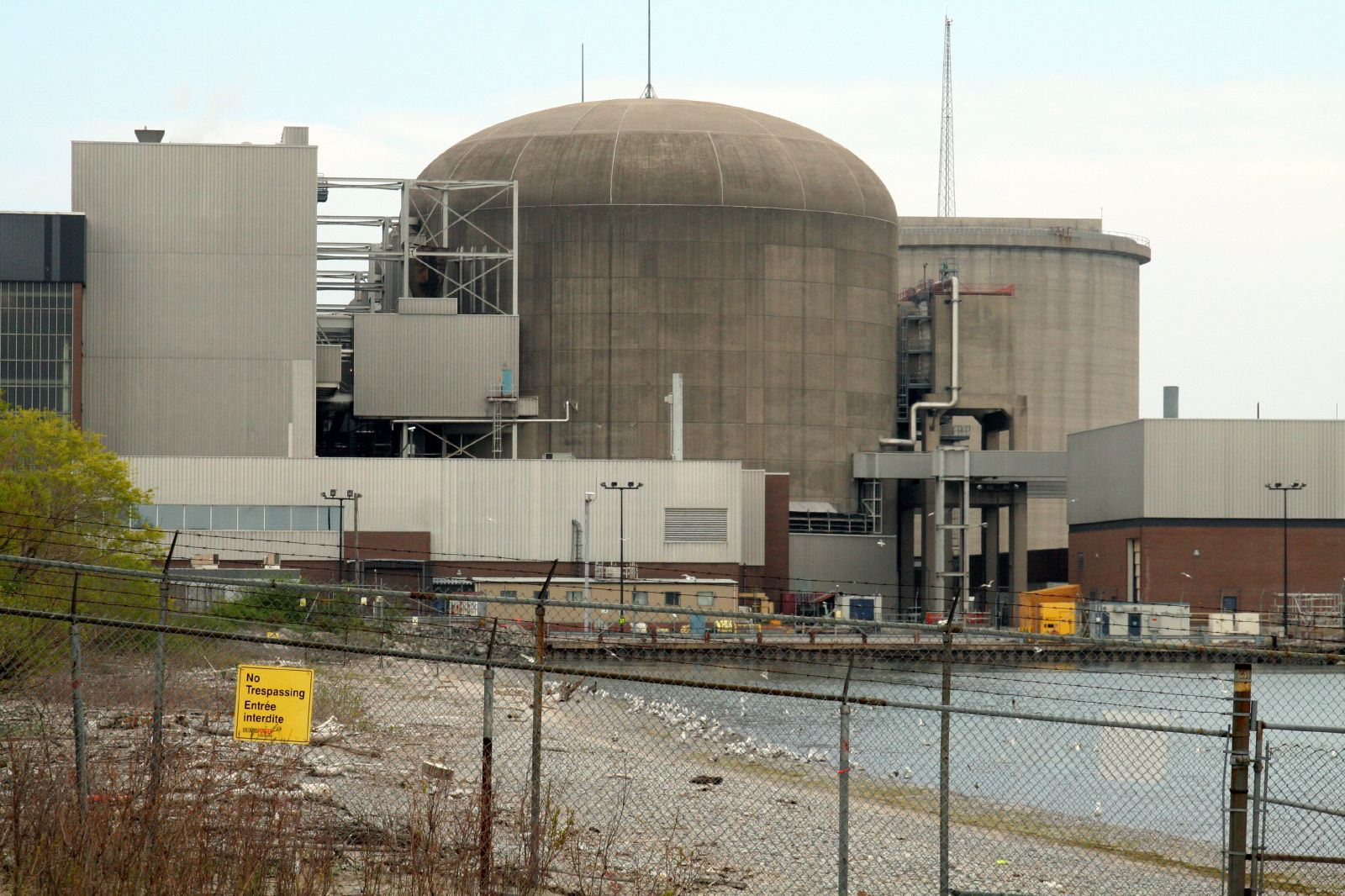
The Pickering Nuclear Generating Station became operational in 1971.

Canada has a long and storied nuclear history. The area of Great Bear Lake has provided uranium for the Manhattan Project and the first Canadian nuclear reactor, the ZEEP, was built in 1945. Two years later, the National Research Council of Canada began operations on the NRX (National Research Experimental) heavy-water reactor at Chalk River Laboratories, near Ottawa. In 1957, it was followed by the National Research Universal Reactor (NRU).

In the meantime, Ontario Hydro, Canadian General Electric and Atomic Energy of Canada Limited began working on an experimental nuclear power plant, the Nuclear Power Demonstration, in Rolphton, Ontario, not far from Chalk River. The 22 MW reactor generated Canada's first nuclear energy to the grid on June 4, 1962.

The first full-scale nuclear power plant, the Douglas Point Nuclear Generating Station, entered commercial service on September 26, 1968. Douglas Point generated 220 MW and was built for $91 million. The CANDU reactor was then built at three locations in Ontario in the next 25 years, in Pickering, Bruce County and Clarington.

Of the 20 nuclear reactors operational in Canada, only two are located outside Ontario: Gentilly-2, near Trois-Rivières, Quebec, and Point Lepreau, west of Saint John, New Brunswick. Both became operational in 1983.
