= Candu =

Candu or CANDU may refer to

- CANDU reactor (CANada Deuterium Uranium), a Canadian pressurized heavy water reactor
  - Advanced CANDU reactor
  - CANDU Owners Group
  - Candu Energy, a Canadian organization specializing in the design and supply of nuclear reactors and related products and services
- Andrian Candu (born 1975), a Moldovan politician
