= Advanced CANDU reactor =

Canadian third generation nuclear reactor design

The Advanced CANDU reactor (ACR), or ACR-1000, was a proposed Generation III+ nuclear reactor design, developed by Atomic Energy of Canada Limited (AECL). It combined features of the existing CANDU pressurised heavy-water reactors (PHWR) with features of light-water-cooled pressurized water reactors (PWR). From CANDU, it took the heavy-water moderator, which gave the design an improved neutron economy that allowed it to burn a variety of fuels. It replaced the heavy water cooling loop with one containing conventional light water, reducing costs. The name refers to its design power in the 1,000 MWe class, with the baseline around 1,200 MWe.

The ACR-1000 was introduced as a lower-priced option compared to a larger version of the baseline CANDU which was being designed, the CANDU 9. ACR was slightly larger but less expensive to build and run. The downside was that it did not have the flexibility of fuels that the original CANDU design offered, and would no longer run on pure unenriched uranium. This was a small price to pay given the low cost of enrichment services and fuel in general.

AECL bid the ACR-1000 on several proposals around the world but won no contests. The last serious proposal was for a two-reactor expansion of the Darlington Nuclear Generating Station, but this project was canceled in 2009 when the price was estimated to be three times what the government was budgeting. With no other sales prospects, in 2011 the AECL reactor design division was sold to SNC-Lavalin to provide services to the existing CANDU fleet. Development of the ACR ended.

== Design ==
=== CANDU ===
The original CANDU design used heavy water as both the neutron moderator and the coolant for the primary cooling loop. It was believed that this design would result in lower overall operating costs due to its ability to use natural uranium for fuel, eliminating the need for enrichment. At the time, it was believed there would be hundreds and perhaps thousands of nuclear reactors in operation by the 1980s, and in that case the cost of enrichment would become considerable.

Further, the design used both pressurized and unpressurized sections, the latter known as a "calandria", which it was believed would lower construction costs compared to designs that used highly pressurized cores. In contrast to typical light water designs, CANDU did not require a single large pressure vessel, which was among the more complex parts of other designs. This design also allowed it to be refuelled while it was running, improving the capacity factor, a key metric in overall performance.

However, the use of natural uranium also meant the core was much less dense compared to other designs, and much larger overall. It was expected this additional cost would be offset by lower capital costs on other items, as well as lower operational costs. The key trade-off was the cost of the fuel, in an era when enriched uranium fuel was limited and expensive and its price was expected to rise considerably by the 1980s.

In practice, these advantages did not work out. The high expected fuel costs never came to be; when reactor construction stalled at around 200 units worldwide, instead of the expected thousands, fuel costs remained steady as there was ample enrichment capability for the amount of fuel being used. This left CANDU in the unexpected position of selling itself primarily on the lack of need for enrichment and the possibility that this presented a lower nuclear proliferation risk.

=== ACR ===
ACR addresses the high capital costs of the CANDU design primarily by using low-enrichment uranium (LEU) fuel. This allows the reactor core to be built much more compactly, roughly half that of a CANDU of the same power. Additionally, it replaces the heavy-water coolant in the high-pressure section of the calandria with light water. This greatly reduces the amount of heavy water needed, and the cost of the primary coolant loop. Heavy water remains in the low-pressure section of the calandria, where it is essentially static and used only as a moderator.

The reactivity regulating and safety devices are located within the low-pressure moderator. The ACR also incorporates characteristics of the CANDU design, including on-power refueling with the CANFLEX fuel; a long prompt neutron lifetime; small reactivity holdup; two fast, independent, safety shutdown systems; and an emergency core cooling system.

The fuel bundle is a variant of the 43-element CANFLEX design (CANFLEX-ACR). The use of LEU fuel with a neutron absorbing centre element allows the reduction of coolant void reactivity coefficient to a nominally small, negative value. It also results in higher burnup operation than traditional CANDU designs.

== Safety systems ==
The ACR-1000 design currently calls for a variety of safety systems, most of which are evolutionary derivatives of the systems utilized on the CANDU 6 reactor design. Each ACR requires both SDS1 & SDS2 to be online and fully operational before they will operate at any power level.

Safety Shutdown System 1 (SDS1): SDS1 is designed to rapidly and automatically terminate reactor operation. Neutron-absorbing rods (control rods that shut down the nuclear chain reaction) are stored inside isolated channels located directly above the reactor vessel (calandria) and are controlled via a triple-channel logic circuit. When any 2 of the 3 circuit paths are activated (due to sensing the need for emergency reactor trip), the direct current-controlled clutches that keep each control-rod in the storage position are de-energized. The result is that each control-rod is inserted into the calandria, and the reactor heat output is reduced by 90% within 2 seconds.

Safety Shutdown System 2 (SDS2): SDS2 is also designed to rapidly and automatically terminate reactor operation. Gadolinium nitrate (Gd(NO_{3})_{3}) solution, a neutron-absorbing liquid that shuts down the nuclear chain reaction, is stored inside channels that feed into horizontal nozzle assemblies. Each nozzle has an electronically controlled valve, all of which are controlled via a triple-channel logic circuit. When any 2 of the 3 circuit paths are activated (due to sensing the need for emergency reactor trip), each of these valves are opened and Gd(NO_{3})_{3} solution is injected through the nozzles to mix with the heavy-water moderator liquid in the reactor vessel (calandria). The result is that the reactor heat output is reduced by 90% within 2 seconds.

Reserve water system (RWS): The RWS consists of a water tank located at a high elevation within the reactor building. This provides water for use in cooling an ACR that has suffered a loss of coolant accident (LOCA). The RWS can also provide emergency water (via gravity-feed) to the steam generators, moderator system, shield cooling system or the heat transport system of any ACR.

Emergency power supply system (EPS): The EPS system is designed to provide each ACR unit with the required electrical power needed to perform all safety functions under both operating & accident conditions. It contains seismically qualified, redundant standby generators, batteries and distribution switchgear.

Cooling water system (CWS): The CWS provides all necessary light water (H_{2}O) required to perform all safety system-related functions under both operating & accident conditions. All safety-related portions of the system are seismically qualified and contain redundant divisions.

== Operational cost ==
The ACR has a planned lifetime capacity factor of greater than 93%. This is achieved by a three-year planned outage frequency, with a 21-day planned outage duration and 1.5% per year forced outage. Quadrant separation allows flexibility for on-line maintenance and outage management. A high degree of safety system testing automation also reduces cost.

== Abandonment ==
Bruce Power considered ACR in 2007 for deployment in Western Canada, both for power generation, or for steam generation to be used in processing oil sands. In 2011, Bruce Power decided not to move forward with this project.

In 2008, the province of New Brunswick accepted a proposal for a feasibility study for an ACR-1000 at Point Lepreau. This led to a formal bid by Team Candu, consisting of AECL, GE Canada, Hitachi Canada, Babcock & Wilcox Canada and SNC-Lavalin Nuclear, which proposed using a 1085 MWe ACR-1000. Nothing further came of this bid. It was later replaced by a mid-2010 bid by Areva, a bid that also lapsed.

AECL was marketing the ACR-1000 as part of the UK's Generic Design Process but pulled out in April 2008. CEO Hugh MacDiarmid is quoted as stating, "We believe very strongly that our best course of action to ensure the ACR-1000 is successful in the global market place is to focus first and foremost on establishing it here at home."

The ACR-1000 was submitted as part of Ontario's request for proposal (RFP) for the Darlington B installation. Ultimately, AECL was the only company to place a formal bid, with a two-reactor ACR-1000 plant. The bids required that all contingencies for time and budget overruns be considered in the plans. The resulting bid was $26 billion for a total of 2,400 MWe, or over $10,800 per kilowatt. This was three times what had been expected, and called "shockingly high". As this was the only bid, the Ministry of Energy and Infrastructure decided to cancel the expansion project in 2009.

In 2011, with no sales prospects remaining, the Canadian government sold AECL's reactor division to SNC-Lavalin. In 2014, SNC announced a partnership with the China National Nuclear Corporation (CNNC) to support sales and construction of the existing CANDU designs. Among these was a plan to use their two CANDU-6 reactors in a recycling scheme under the name Advanced Fuel CANDU Reactor (AFCR). However, these plans did not proceed. SNC and CNNC subsequently announced collaboration on a Heavy-Water Reactor, also based on legacy CANDU technology, and unrelated to the Advanced Heavy-Water Reactor being developed in India.

== See also ==
- Carolinas–Virginia Tube Reactor - a prototype heavy-water reactor fueled with ~2% U235
- Other Gen III designs
  - EPR
  - AP1000
  - ESBWR
  - ABWR
  - US-APWR
  - VVER-1200
