= CANFLEX =

CANFLEX is an advanced fuel bundle designed for CANDU design nuclear reactors. Its name is derived from its function: CANDU FLEXible fueling. It was developed by Atomic Energy of Canada Ltd. (AECL), along with the Korean Atomic Energy Research Institute (KAERI). The designers claim that it will deliver many benefits to current and future CANDU reactors-using natural uranium or other advanced nuclear fuel cycles. These include greater operating and safety margins, extended plant life, better economics and increased power.

== Development and testing history ==
Development began in the mid-1980s by AECL, with KAERI joining in 1991. The design was finalized and validated through extensive out-reactor testing, including mechanical fretting tests, hydraulic flow tests, and critical heat flux experiments.

In 1998, a demonstration irradiation of 24 CANFLEX-NU bundles was conducted in the Point Lepreau CANDU-6 reactor (New Brunswick, Canada). Results confirmed all design predictions—showing excellent structural integrity, expected burnup profiles, and compliance with regulatory standards.

Parallel testing was performed in Wolsong Unit 1 (South Korea), where KAERI irradiated 24 CANFLEX-NU bundles to verify performance under Korean operating conditions. The success of these tests validated both the mechanical and nuclear performance of CANFLEX fuel, paving the way for commercialization.

By the early 2000s, CANFLEX-NU had been fully qualified for reactor operation. British Nuclear Fuels (BNFL) later joined the collaboration to support CANFLEX-RU manufacturing for advanced fuel cycle reuse.

Recently, the CANFLEX program represents a major collaboration between AECL (Canada) and KAERI (Korea), supported by NB Power, KHNP, and the CANDU Owners Group (COG). It reflects over two decades of coordinated R&D in advanced fuel design, with later contributions from BNFL (UK) for recycled uranium integration.

== Features ==
The CANFLEX bundle has 43 fuel elements, with two element sizes. It is about 10 cm (four inches) in diameter, 0.5 m (20 inches) long and weighs about 20 kg (44 lbs) and replaces 37-pin standard bundle. It has been designed specifically to increase fuel performance by utilizing two different pin diameters. This reduces the power rating of the hottest pins in the bundles, for the same total bundle power output. Also, the design incorporates special geometry modifications that enhance the heat transfer between the fuel and surrounding coolant. Twenty-four of these fuel bundles have been tested in the Point Lepreau CANDU 6 reactor in New Brunswick, Canada, and results indicate CANFLEX meets all expectations and regulatory requirements.

To achieve this, the CANFLEX bundle uses two concentric rings of smaller-diameter rods (11.5 mm) surrounding a core of slightly larger rods (13.5 mm), giving it a flatter radial power distribution and lowering peak linear power by approximately 20% compared to the 37-element design. The geometry includes CHF-enhancement appendages, CANLUB graphite coatings on the inside of the fuel sheaths to reduce pellet-cladding interaction, and optimized spacer and bearing pad designs to improve heat transfer and hydraulic stability. The result is an increase in critical heat flux (CHF) and a 4–5% higher critical channel power, improving dryout margins and enhancing reactor safety.

The CANFLEX bundle is fully compatible with existing CANDU reactor channels and fueling machines, requiring no changes to reactor hardware or refueling systems, making it a true “drop-in” replacement for current fuel designs. Its flexibility also allows operation with a wide range of fuel types—natural uranium (CANFLEX-NU), slightly enriched uranium (CANFLEX-SEU), recovered uranium from LWR spent fuel (CANFLEX-RU), and low-void-reactivity fuel (CANFLEX-LVRF).

=== Fuel composition and variants ===
- CANFLEX-NU: Uses natural UO₂ and serves as the baseline design; qualified and demonstrated in Canadian and Korean reactors.
- CANFLEX-RU: Uses recovered uranium (≈0.9% U-235) from reprocessed LWR fuel, allowing recycling and reducing uranium demand.
- CANFLEX-SEU: Uses slightly enriched uranium (≈1.0–1.2% U-235), offering higher burnup and lower fuel cycle costs.
- CANFLEX-LVRF: Uses ≈1% enriched UO₂ optimized for negative void reactivity, developed for Bruce Power’s safety-focused fuel program.

Studies have shown that CANFLEX-RU or CANFLEX-SEU fuels can achieve up to 1.7 times higher burnup than standard natural uranium fuel, with more negative temperature and void coefficients, enhancing overall safety.

=== Applications and reactor integration ===
Twenty-four of these fuel bundles have been tested in the Point Lepreau CANDU 6 reactor in New Brunswick, Canada, and results indicate CANFLEX meets all expectations and regulatory requirements. Similar demonstration tests were conducted at Wolsong Unit 1 in South Korea, confirming CANFLEX’s mechanical robustness, enhanced heat transfer, and improved safety margins.

The Bruce Nuclear Generating Station announced a conversion to CANFLEX fuel for its reactors in 2006. As part of this initiative, Bruce Power launched the Low-Void-Reactivity Fuel (LVRF) Project, adapting the CANFLEX geometry for slightly enriched uranium to reduce positive void reactivity and enhance safety. This included extensive out-reactor testing, demonstration irradiations, and full regulatory reviews.

CANFLEX has also been evaluated for use in advanced CANDU reactor designs (ACR) and thorium–uranium mixed oxide (Th-MOX) fuels, demonstrating its flexibility for future fuel cycles.

== See also ==
- Nuclear fuel
- Nuclear fuel cycle
- Uranium market
- Reprocessed uranium
- Global Nuclear Energy Partnership
