= Nuclear Power Demonstration =

Canadian prototype nuclear power reactor

- Country: Canada
- Location: Rolphton, Ontario (200 km northwest of Ottawa, Ontario)
- Coordinates: 46°11′12″N 77°39′28″W
- Status: Decommissioned
- Commission date: 1962
- Decommission date: 1987
- Owner: Atomic Energy of Canada Limited
- Operator: Ontario Hydro

Nuclear power station
- Reactor type: CANDU (prototype)

Power generation
- Nameplate capacity: 19.5 MW

Nuclear Power Demonstration (or NPD) was the first Canadian nuclear power reactor, and the prototype for the CANDU reactor design. Built by Canadian General Electric (now GE Canada), in partnership with Atomic Energy of Canada Limited (AECL) and the Hydro Electric Power Commission of Ontario (HEPCO, later Ontario Hydro, now Ontario Power Generation) it consisted of a single 22 MWe pressurized heavy water reactor (PHWR) unit located in Rolphton, Ontario, not far from AECL's Chalk River Laboratories. NPD was owned by AECL and operated by Ontario Hydro.

The NPD was the prototype and proving ground for research and development that led to commercial application of the CANDU system for generating electric power from a nuclear plant using natural uranium fuel, heavy water moderator and coolant in a pressure tube configuration with on-power refuelling.

== Description ==
The NPD station was located on the west bank of the Ottawa River about 140 miles (230 km) upstream from the City of Ottawa. It was situated close by the AECL research establishment at Chalk River and the HEPC hydro generating station at Des Joachims, Ontario. It had a maximum continuous output of 22 MW(e), which gave a net station output of 19.5 MW(e).

The reactor was fueled with 40,000 pounds (18,000 kg) of UO_{2} in the form of ceramic pellets sheathed in Zircaloy-2 tubes. The fuel was subdivided into nine bundles per channel, and fuel changing was designed to be carried out on power by remotely operated machines which push a fresh bundle in one end of the channel and remove the spent bundle from the other end, a design feature that carried through to the later CANDU products.

The primary role of NPD was as a prototype for CANDU engineering. Over the years it served as a test bed for new fuels, materials, components, and instruments.

Equally important, NPD was the training and simulation centre for generations of Canadian and off-shore CANDU operations staff. This role began shortly after the start of operation, when a training program was set up by Ontario Hydro.

== History ==
The official NPD sod-turning event occurred on September 19, 1956. Participants were: Ontario Premier Leslie Frost. federal Minister of Trade and Commerce C.D. Howe; AECL president William J. (Bill) Bennet; and HEPCO president R. (Dick) Hearn. However, with advances in scientific knowledge (e.g., zirconium-alloy pressure tubes) the initial reactor design work (NPD-1, a vertical-fueled pressure-vessel reactor) was halted on March 27, 1957. A new design (NPD-2, later simply called NPD) was developed with horizontal pressure tubes, a low-pressure calandria vessel, and on-line refueling.

In December 1961, the major construction phase was concluded and system testing was in full swing. Criticality was first attained on April 11, 1962, and first steam of nuclear origin was produced on May 8. The first electrical power was fed to the system on June 4, and on June 28 first full-power generation of 20 MW(e) gross was attained.

NPD began operation in 1962 and was operational until 1987, long after vastly more powerful and modern CANDU units came on-line. The first nuclear-produced power in Canada was generated at NPD, which also served as the "proof of concept" prototype for the later CANDU designs. As with all commercial CANDU units to follow, NPD operated with natural uranium fuel in a horizontal pressure-tube core, was both moderated and cooled by heavy water, and was refuelable on-load. NPD closed in 1987 after exceeding its operational goals. As of 2006, all nuclear fuel and non-nuclear equipment have been removed from the site, while much of the nuclear equipment (reactor vessel, pipes, tanks etc. that have become radioactive in the process of operation of the reactor) is still present. AECL intends to leave potentially active or contaminated equipment on site for some decades yet to allow for further radioactive decay.

The site was commemorated by a historical plaque detailing the operational history and highlights of the station. However, for reasons of security and public safety, the plaque is set three kilometres west of the site at a highway lookout, and the site itself cannot be seen from the plaque's location. Another bronze plaque and monument commemorating NPD, formerly located on the NPD site, was relocated to the Schoolhouse Museum about three kilometers to the east of the site. The Schoolhouse Museum also includes a scale model of the plant and other historical artefacts. The Canadian Nuclear Heritage Museum in Deep River, Ontario also has a number of documents, files and artifacts (including a fuel channel end plug, generator nameplates and the control room clock). The museum also has a copy of the 1963 film "Nuclear Power Demonstration (NPD)" by F. R. Crawley of Crawley Films in Ottawa.

NPD was followed by the 200 MWe Douglas Point Nuclear Generating Station on the shore of Lake Huron.

== See also ==
- List of Canadian nuclear generating stations
- Nuclear Power

Similar "firsts" in other countries:

- Experimental Breeder Reactor I, US 200 KWe plant (1951)
- Obninsk Nuclear Power Plant, first Soviet pilot plant, 5 MWe (1954)
- Calder Hall Nuclear Power Station, first UK plant to generate electricity (1956)
- Shippingport Atomic Power Station, first "full scale" US demonstration plant, 60 MWe (1957)
