= CKML =

Emergency information radio station at Chalk River, Ontario

- Chalk River, Ontario; Canada
- Frequency: 530 kHz

Programming
- Format: Emergency information for the Chalk River Laboratories

Ownership
- Owner: Atomic Energy of Canada Limited; (The Security Systems Coordinator, Chalk River Laboratories)

History
- First air date: 1998
- Last air date: 2012

Technical information
- Transmitter coordinates: 46°02′40″N 77°23′35″W

CKML was a 50-watt radio station owned by Atomic Energy of Canada Limited through licensee "The Security Systems Coordinator, Chalk River Laboratories" which operated at 530 kHz on the AM band in Chalk River, Ontario, Canada. The station was designed solely to broadcast emergency information in event of an accident at the laboratory.

The station was approved by the Canadian Radio-television and Telecommunications Commission (CRTC) in 1998. CKML, was not considered as a continuous broadcasting station. The service was tested for one hour each month and, once a year, a two-hour emergency exercise was carried out. In a real emergency situation, the service could have been used for many hours.

According to the June 2020 issue of the Canadian Radio News Facebook page, CKML is off the air. There were no license renewals issued after the expiry date in 2012.
