= Nordion =

Health science company

Nordion Inc.
- Type: Subsidiary
- Industry: Health Science
- Founded: 1946 (80 years ago)
- Headquarters: Ottawa, Ontario, Canada
- Area served: Global
- Key people: Kevin Brooks
- Products: Gamma Technologies; Medical Isotopes
- Revenue: US$244.8 million (2012); (equivalent to $343.3 million in 2025)
- Number of employees: ~350 (2015)
- Parent: Sotera Health LLC
- Website: www.nordion.com

Nordion Inc., a Sotera Health company, is a health science company that provides Cobalt-60 used for sterilization and treatment of disease (radiotherapy).

Nordion is headquartered in Ottawa, Ontario, Canada, with a facility in Abingdon, Oxfordshire, United Kingdom. Riaz Bandali is the company's President. The company was acquired by Sotera Health in 2014 for US$805 million (equivalent to $1047.62 million in 2025).

== History ==
Founded in 1946, originally the radium sales department of Eldorado Mining and Refining Ltd., the division developed one of the first radiotherapy units that used the radioisotope cobalt-60 to destroy cancerous tumours.

Soon after, the division was given responsibility for selling radioisotopes produced by the newly established Chalk River Nuclear Laboratories, a nuclear research facility at Chalk River, Ontario. As a result, in 1951, Eldorado established a commercial products division (CPD) to manage the isotope business, especially cobalt-60 used in cancer treatment.

In 1952, the federal government created Atomic Energy of Canada Limited (AECL), a Crown corporation. Shortly thereafter, CPD was transferred to AECL, where it remained for the next 40 years and was renamed the radio-chemical division.

In 1988, ownership of the radio-chemical division was transferred from AECL to the Canadian Development Investment Corporation (CDIC). The company assumed a new name, Nordion International Inc. and was later sold to MDS Health Group in 1991.

In 2010, MDS Inc. completed a strategic repositioning which saw the Company divest its MDS Analytical Technologies and MDS Pharma Services businesses. Also in 2010, shareholders of MDS Inc. approved a change of name from MDS Inc. to Nordion Inc. The Company officially changed its name to Nordion Inc. on November 1, 2010.

In July 2013, Nordion completed the divestiture of its Targeted Therapies business to BTG plc. The company is now focused on Nordion and its sterilization technologies and medical isotopes businesses.

The company generated US$244.8 million USD (equivalent to $318.58 million in 2025) in revenues in the 2012 fiscal year, with over 70% of its revenue coming from within North America.

It was acquired by Sotera Health in 2014 for US$805 million (equivalent to $1047.62 million in 2025). The company's press release stated that the acquisition created "the only vertically integrated sterilization company in the world."

Nordion sold its Medical Isotopes business in 2018.

== Products ==
=== Gamma technologies ===
Nordion supplies cobalt-60, the isotope that produces the gamma radiation required to destroy harmful micro-organisms. Customers use Nordion's gamma-sterilization technologies to sterilize medical surgical supplies and devices, as well as certain consumer products, such as food and cosmetics. Nordion's cobalt-60 is used for a form of cancer treatment called stereotactic radiosurgery.

The company also designs and sells production irradiators.

== Locations ==
The Nordion corporate headquarters are located in Ottawa, Ontario, Canada. The headquarters are the main manufacturing facilities for medical isotopes, used in medical imaging and radiopharmaceuticals, and for cobalt-60 sources and industrial food irradiators.

The Nordion Gamma Centre of Excellence (GCE) is a gamma irradiation research, training, and demonstration facility located in Laval, Quebec, Canada. The GCE is operated in partnership with the University of Quebec's Armand Frappier Institute.

Nordion has an Asia Pacific Sales Office in Hong Kong.

The company used to have facilities in Vancouver, British Columbia and Laval, Quebec.
