= Douglas Point Nuclear Generating Station =

Nuclear power plant

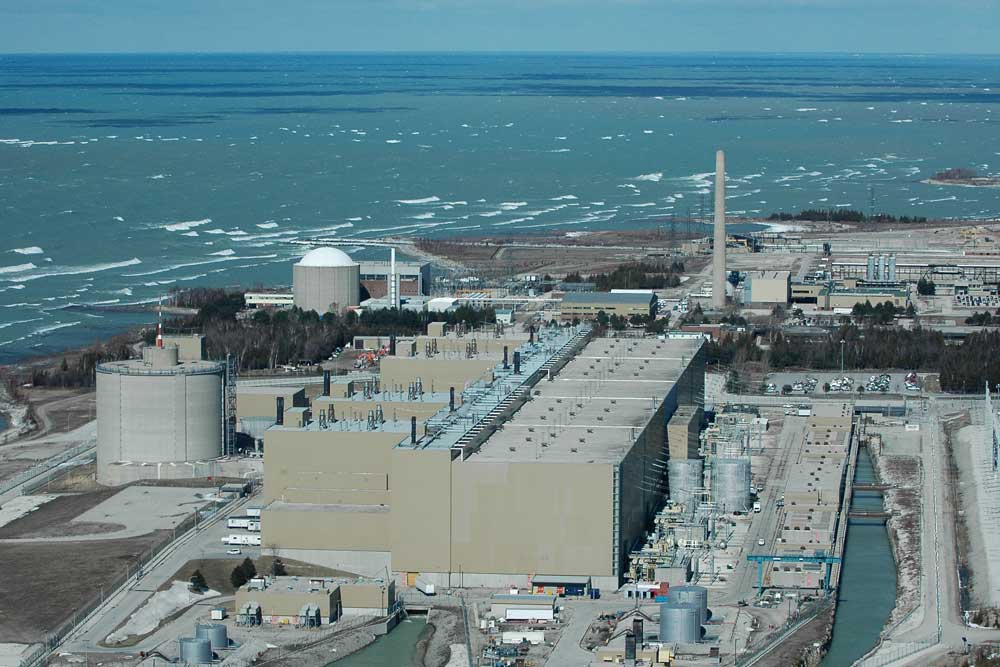
- Country: Canada
- Location: Kincardine, Bruce County, Ontario
- Coordinates: 44°19′36″N 81°36′00″W
- Status: Decommissioned
- Construction began: February 1, 1960
- Commission date: September 26, 1968
- Decommission date: May 4, 1984
- Owner: Atomic Energy of Canada Limited
- Operator: Ontario Hydro

Nuclear power station
- Reactor type: CANDU PHWR
- Reactor supplier: Atomic Energy of Canada Limited
- Cooling source: Lake Huron
- Thermal capacity: 1 × 704 MW_{th}

Power generation
- Make and model: CANDU 200
- Units decommissioned: 1 × 206 MW
- Capacity factor: 55.6% (lifetime)
- Annual net output: 951 GW·h (lifetime average)

The Douglas Point Nuclear Generating Station was Canada’s first full-scale nuclear power plant and the second CANDU (CANada Deuterium Uranium) pressurised heavy water reactor. Its success was a major milestone and marked Canada's entry into the global nuclear power scene. The same site was later used for the Bruce Nuclear Generating Station.

Douglas Point was built and owned by Atomic Energy of Canada Limited (AECL) but operated by Ontario Hydro. It was in service from 26 September 1968 to 5 May 1984. The plant served as a teaching tool for the emerging Canadian nuclear industry, and the experience gained was applied to the later CANDU power plants.

== Design ==
The first CANDU was a demonstration unit, the Nuclear Power Demonstrator (NPD). In 1958, before NPD was complete, AECL formed the Nuclear Power Plant Division at Ontario Hydro’s A.W. Manby Service Centre in Toronto to manage the construction of a full-scale prototype for future CANDU commercial power plants. Ontario Hydro would operate the prototype.

The plant would have a 200 MWe reactor and be built in Ontario. The reactor's stainless steel calandria would mass 54.4 tonne (60 ton) and have a 6.1 metres (20 ft) diameter. The design was compact to reduce the required amount of heavy water moderator; the reactor required several tons of heavy water, which was very expensive at $26 per pound (roughly 5 cents per gram). The added cost of using heavy water was at least partially offset by the ability to use natural uranium and forego uranium enrichment - a technology which Canada did not have access to when the CANDU design was developed. While the natural uranium fuel allows for lower burnup than enriched fuel as used in light water reactors, overall more thermal power is extracted from the same amount of uranium ore in a heavy water reactor than in a comparable light water reactor. However, a higher amount of spent nuclear fuel is produced. Foregoing enrichment also means that no depleted uranium is left over. As the lower burnup requires more frequent refueling, the CANDU was designed to be capable of online refueling, a feature successfully demonstrated at Douglas Point (see below) and still a distinguishing factor of the CANDU design.

Sites along Lake Huron on the shoreline north of Manitoulin Island and along the shoreline from Tobermory to Goderich were considered. Low-lying Douglas Point, within the latter area, was chosen by the end of June 1959; its solid limestone base made it ideal. The Hydro Electric Power Commission acquired a 9.31 square kilometres (2,301 acres) area at the site for $50 to $70 an acre, the going price of farm land at the time (1.2 to 1.7 cents per square meter).

Gordon Churchill, the Minister of Trade and Commerce of Canada, officially announced the decision to build the plant at Douglas Point on 18 June 1959.

== Construction ==
In 1961, Douglas Point set up an information office and a Bailey bridge at tree-top level providing a view of the site.

The site was cleared and excavated by 500 workers, including Hydro construction crews from Toronto and locally and provincially hired labour. Contractors included 600 Canadian, plus British and American, firms. Canadian manufacturers supplied 71% of the plant's components, with the remainder coming from British and American manufacturers. The relatively high share of domestic companies and resources used in the construction of this reactor continues to be a feature of CANDU reactors which can now claim a 90+% Canadian supply chain from uranium mine to replacement parts to intermediate storage of spent fuel. This high degree of autarky was a design consideration in the development of the CANDU and led to choices like the Calandria instead of "regular" reactor pressure vessels which were beyond the capabilities of Canadian heavy industry at the time.

The calandria was manufactured by the Dominion Bridge Company of Montreal. It was shipped by barge from Lachine, Quebec to Kincardine, Ontario; from there it was moved 16 kilometres (10 mi) north by flatbed truck to the construction site.

In May 1964, work began on transmission lines linking Douglas Point to the provincial power grid near Hanover. All the major equipment was installed by 1965. The total cost of the plant was $91 million.

Douglas Point had an oil-filled window which allowed direct observation of the East reactor face, even during full-power operation.

== Operation ==
The Douglas Point reactor first attained criticality on 15 November 1966 at 16:26 hours. It began feeding power into the grid on 7 January 1967 and officially entered service on 26 September 1968 with a 54% capacity factor.

The plant made its first on-power fuelling (i.e. refuelling the reactor without having to shut down) on 1 March 1970. This CANDU feature was first demonstrated by NPD on 23 November 1963. While light water reactors are usually not capable of this feat, heavy water reactors like the CANDU and the related IPHWR as well as some graphite moderated reactors like the Magnox, the AGR and the RBMK have this capability as part of their design specs to allow efficient operation at lower burnup with natural uranium or low enriched uranium fuel.

Douglas Point suffered from early unreliability and heavy water leakage. The system was delicate and shut down frequently and easily; the plant was offline for more than half the time between 1968 and 1971. Repairs were expensive and time-consuming, and were made more difficult by the compact design that placed critical components in inaccessible locations. These engineering problems, including the vulnerability of the design to leaks in the primary coolant circuits, are seen and discussed in an official 1968 documentary on the reactor. Repairs were done by remote control or large teams; the latter was done to reduce the time an individual employee was exposed to radiation.

Following the successful deployment of four larger 542 MWe reactors at the Pickering Nuclear Generating Station, the 220 MWe reactor was judged as inadequate. Plans to add another 220 MWe unit to Douglas Point were cancelled.

== Shutdown ==
Douglas Point was shut down on 5 May 1984, having achieved a capacity factor of 75% in 1982, and 82% just before retirement. Douglas Point was not wholly satisfactory as an operational power plant and, being too expensive to up-scale, Ontario Hydro refused to purchase it from AECL. AECL subsequently withdrew funding.

The plant is co-located with the newer Bruce Nuclear Generating Station. Bruce Power now leases the site and the newer plant from Ontario Hydro's successor company, Ontario Power Generation, although the Douglas Point structure and equipment remain owned by AECL.

== See also ==
- List of Canadian nuclear facilities
- Rajasthan Atomic Power Station
