= Candu Energy =

Canadian nuclear reactor company

Candu Energy Inc.
- Type: Subsidiary
- Industry: Nuclear power
- Headquarters: Mississauga, Ontario, Canada
- Area served: Worldwide
- Key people: Joe St. Julian (President)
- Products: CANDU reactor
- Number of employees: 1,400 (2011)
- Parent: AtkinsRéalis (formerly SNC-Lavalin)
- Website: www.candu.com

Candu Energy Inc. is a Canadian wholly owned subsidiary of Montreal-based AtkinsRéalis (formerly SNC-Lavalin Inc.), specializing in the design and supply of nuclear reactors, as well as nuclear reactor products and services. Candu Energy Inc. was created in 2011 when parent company SNC-Lavalin purchased the commercial reactor division of Atomic Energy of Canada Limited (AECL), along with the development and marketing rights to CANDU reactor technology.

Candu Energy Inc. is located in Mississauga, Ontario, Canada. Candu Energy lists its main business lines as:

- CANDU life extension
- CANDU maintenance and performance services
- CANDU new build

The reactor products offered by Candu Energy Inc. are the CANDU 6 and Enhanced CANDU 6 reactors. Candu Energy Inc. also specializes in advanced fuel cycle technology that exploits the fuel cycle flexibility of the CANDU design, including fuels based on recovered uranium (RU) from light-water reactors (LWRs) and mixed-oxide fuel (MOX) incorporating thorium or plutonium.

In 2014, Preston Swafford was hired to lead the company as its chief nuclear officer, president and CEO. Also in 2014, Candu Energy increased sharing of human resources with SNC-Lavalin.
