= Gadolinium(III) nitrate =

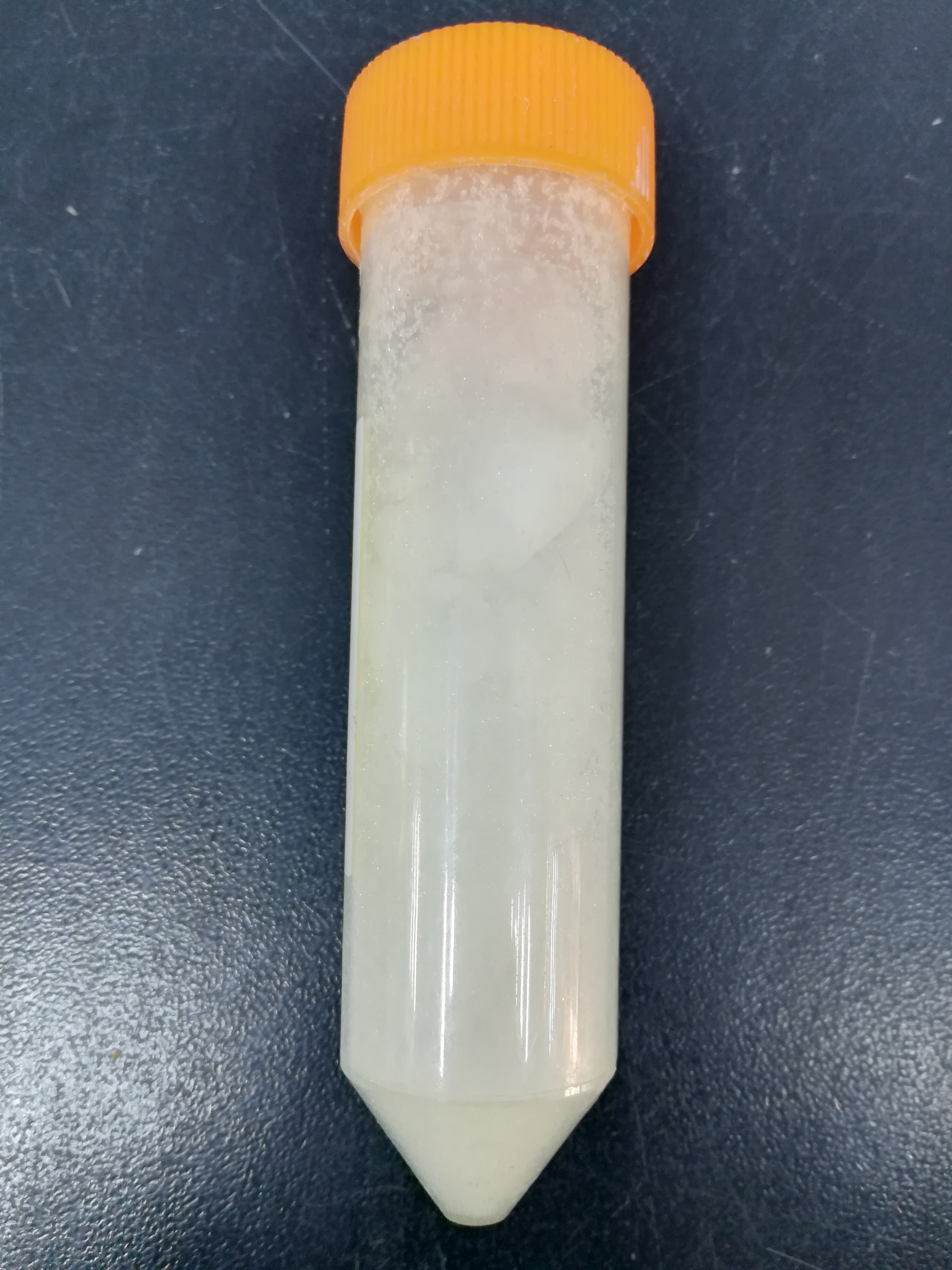

Identifiers
CAS Number	10168-81-7 (anhydrous); 19598-90-4 (hexahydrate)
3D model (JSmol)	Interactive image
ChemSpider	140078
ECHA InfoCard	100.030.385
PubChem CID	159266 (anhydrous); 71438167 (pentahydrate); 209258 (hexahydrate); 132277104 (nonahydrate)
UNII	F2AB55Y5CR
CompTox Dashboard (EPA)	DTXSID80890648
- InChI: InChI=1S/Gd.3NO3/c;3*2-1(3)4/q+3;3*-1 Key: MWFSXYMZCVAQCC-UHFFFAOYSA-N; InChI=1/Gd.3NO3/c;3*2-1(3)4/q+3;3*-1 Key: MWFSXYMZCVAQCC-UHFFFAOYAX
- SMILES: [Gd+3].O=[N+]([O-])[O-].[O-][N+]([O-])=O.[O-][N+]([O-])=O

Properties
Chemical formula	Gd(NO_{3})_{3}
Molar mass	343.26 g/mol
Appearance	White crystalline solid
Density	2.3 g/cm^{3}
Melting point	91 °C (196 °F; 364 K)
Solubility in water	Soluble

Hazards
- GHS labelling
Pictograms	(GHS03: Oxidizing) (GHS05: Corrosive) (GHS07: Exclamation mark) (GHS09: Environmental hazard)
Signal word	Danger
Hazard statements	H272, H315, H318, H319, H335, H410
Precautionary statements	P210, P220, P261, P264, P264+P265, P271, P273, P280, P302+P352, P304+P340, P305+P351+P338, P305+P354+P338, P317, P319, P321, P332+P317, P337+P317, P362+P364, P370+P378, P391, P403+P233, P405, P501
Safety data sheet (SDS)	External MSDS
- Except where otherwise noted, data are given for materials in their standard state (at 25 °C [77 °F], 100 kPa). verify (what is ?) Infobox references

Gadolinium(III) nitrate is an inorganic compound of gadolinium with the formula Gd(NO_{3})_{3}. A hydrate with the formula [Gd(NO_{3})_{3}(H_{2}O)_{4}]·2H_{2}O exists. This salt is used as a water-soluble neutron poison in nuclear reactors. Gadolinium nitrate, like all nitrate salts, is an oxidizing agent.

== Use ==
Gadolinium nitrate was used at the Savannah River Site heavy water nuclear reactors and had to be separated from the heavy water for storage or reuse. The Canadian CANDU reactor, a pressurized heavy water reactor, also uses gadolinium nitrate as a water-soluble neutron poison in heavy water.

Gadolinium nitrate is also used as a raw material in the production of other gadolinium compounds, for production of specialty glasses and ceramics and as a phosphor.
