= CANDU reactor =

Canadian heavy water nuclear reactor design

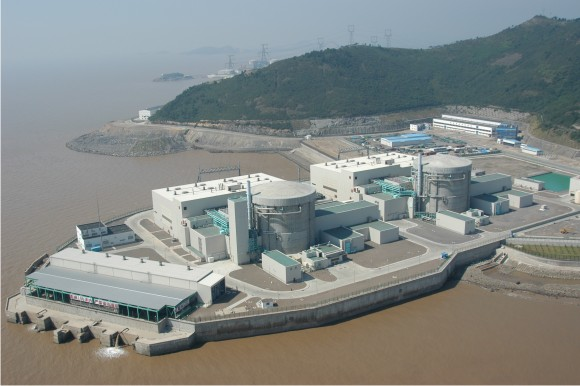
Qinshan Phase III units 1 and 2, located in Zhejiang, China.

The CANDU (Canada deuterium uranium) is a Canadian pressurized heavy-water reactor design used to generate electric power. The acronym refers to its deuterium oxide (heavy water) moderator and its use of (originally, natural) uranium fuel. CANDU reactors were first developed in the late 1950s and 1960s by a partnership between Atomic Energy of Canada Limited (AECL), the Hydro-Electric Power Commission of Ontario, Canadian General Electric, and other companies. It was later exported, and in 2026 there were 26 operational CANDU reactors worldwide: 17 in Canada, three in South Korea, two each in Romania and China, and one each in India and Argentina.

There have been two major types of CANDU reactors, the original design of around 500 MW_{e} that was intended to be used in multi-reactor installations in large plants, and the optimized CANDU 6 in the 600 MW_{e} class that is designed to be used in single stand-alone units or in small multi-unit plants. CANDU 6 units were built in Quebec and New Brunswick, as well as Pakistan, Argentina, South Korea, Romania, and China. A single example of a non-CANDU 6 design was sold to India. The multi-unit design was used only in Ontario, Canada, and grew in size and power as more units were installed in the province, reaching ~880 MW_{e} in the units installed at the Darlington Nuclear Generating Station. An effort to optimize the larger units in a fashion similar to CANDU 6 led to the CANDU 9.

By the early 2000s, sales prospects for the original CANDU designs were dwindling due to the introduction of newer designs from other companies. AECL responded by cancelling CANDU 9 development and moving to the Advanced CANDU reactor (ACR) design. ACR failed to find any buyers; its last potential sale was for an expansion at Darlington, but this was cancelled in 2009. In October 2011, the Canadian Federal Government licensed the CANDU design to Candu Energy (a wholly owned subsidiary of SNC-Lavalin, now the AtkinsRéalis Group Inc.), which also acquired the former reactor development and marketing division of AECL at that time.

In 2017, a consultation with industry led Natural Resources Canada to establish a "SMR Roadmap" targeting the development of small modular reactors (SMRs). In response, SNC-Lavalin developed a 300 MW_{e} SMR version of the CANDU, the CANDU SMR, which it began to highlight on its website. In 2020, the CANDU SMR was not selected for further design work for a Canadian demonstration project. SNC-Lavalin is still looking at marketing a 300 MW SMR in part due to projected demand due to climate change mitigation.

== Design and operation ==
Schematic diagram of a CANDU reactor: Hot and cold sides of the primary heavy-water loop; hot and cold sides of secondary light-water loop; and cool heavy water moderator in the calandria, along with partially inserted adjuster rods (as CANDU control rods are known).: 1. Fuel bundle; 2. Calandria (reactor core); 3. Adjuster rods; 4. Pressurizer; 5. Steam generator; 6. Light-water pump; 7. Heavy-water pump; 8. Fueling machines; 9. Heavy-water moderator; 10. Pressure tube; 11. Steam going to steam turbine; 12. Cold water returning from turbine; 13. Containment building made of reinforced concrete

The basic operation of the CANDU design is similar to other nuclear reactors. Fission reactions in the reactor core heat pressurized water in a primary cooling loop. A heat exchanger, also known as a steam generator, transfers the heat to a secondary cooling loop, which powers a steam turbine with an electric generator attached to it (for a typical Rankine thermodynamic cycle). The exhaust steam from the turbines is then cooled, condensed and returned as feedwater to the steam generator. The final cooling often uses cooling water from a nearby source, such as a lake, river, or ocean. Newer CANDU plants, such as the Darlington Nuclear Generating Station near Toronto, Ontario, use a diffuser to spread the warm outlet water over a larger volume and limit the effects on the environment. Although all CANDU plants to date have used open-cycle cooling, modern CANDU designs can use cooling towers instead.

Where the CANDU design differs from most other designs is in the details of the fissile core and the primary cooling loop. Natural uranium consists of a mix of mostly uranium-238 with small amounts of uranium-235 and trace amounts of other isotopes. Fission in these elements releases high-energy neutrons, which can cause other ^{235}U atoms in the fuel to undergo fission as well. This process is more effective when the neutron energies are lower than what the reactions release naturally. Most reactors use some form of neutron moderator to lower the energy of the neutrons, or "thermalize" them, which makes the reaction more efficient. The energy lost by the neutrons during this moderation process heats the moderator, and this heat is extracted for power.

Most commercial reactor designs use normal water as the moderator. Water absorbs some of the neutrons, enough that it is not possible to keep the reaction going in natural uranium. CANDU replaces this "light" water with heavy water. Heavy water's extra neutron decreases its ability to absorb excess neutrons, resulting in a better neutron economy. This allows CANDU to run on unenriched natural uranium, or uranium mixed with a wide variety of other materials such as plutonium and thorium. This was a major goal of the CANDU design; by operating on natural uranium the cost of enrichment is removed. This also presents an advantage in nuclear proliferation terms, as there is no need for enrichment facilities, which might also be used for weapons.

=== Calandria and fuel design ===
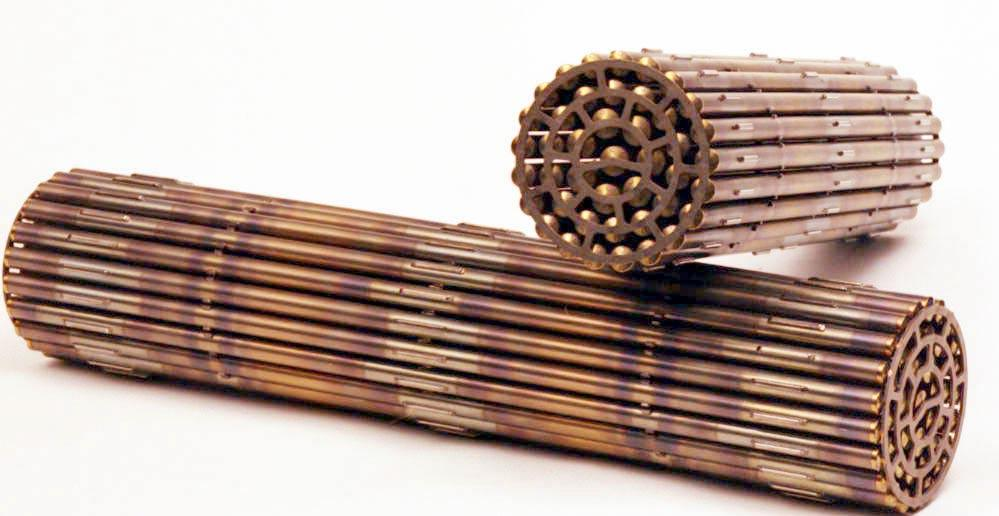
Two CANDU fuel bundles: each is about 50 cm in length and 10 cm in diameter, and can generate about 1 GWh (3.6 TJ) of electricity during its time in a CANDU reactor

In conventional light-water reactor (LWR) designs, the entire fissile core is placed in a large pressure vessel. The amount of heat that can be removed by a unit of a coolant is a function of the temperature; by pressurizing the core, the water can be heated to much greater temperatures before boiling, thereby removing more heat and allowing the core to be smaller and more efficient.

Building a pressure vessel of the required size is a significant challenge, and at the time of the CANDU's design, Canada's heavy industry lacked the requisite experience and capability to cast and machine reactor pressure vessels of the required size. This problem is amplified by natural uranium fuel's lower fissile density, which requires a larger reactor core. This issue was so major that even the relatively small pressure vessel originally intended for use in the NPD prior to its mid-construction redesign could not be fabricated domestically and had to be manufactured in Scotland instead. Domestic development of the technology required to produce pressure vessels of the size required for commercial-scale heavy water moderated power reactors was thought to be very unlikely.

In CANDU the fuel bundles of about 10 cm diameter are composed of many smaller metal tubes. The bundles are contained in pressure tubes within a larger vessel containing additional heavy water acting as a moderator. This larger vessel, known as a calandria, is not pressurized and remains at lower temperatures, making it easier to fabricate. In order to prevent the heat from the pressure tubes from leaking into the surrounding moderator, each pressure tube is enclosed in a calandria tube. Carbon dioxide gas in the gap between the two tubes acts as an insulator. The moderator tank also acts as a large heat sink that provides an additional safety feature.

In a conventional pressurized water reactor, refuelling the system requires shutting down the core and opening the pressure vessel. In CANDU reactors, the tube being refuelled remains pressurized. This allows the CANDU system to be continually refuelled without shutting down, another major design goal. In modern systems, two robotic machines attach to the reactor faces and open the end caps of a pressure tube. One machine pushes in the new fuel, whereby the depleted fuel is pushed out and collected at the other end. A significant operational advantage of online refuelling is that a failed or leaking fuel bundle can be removed from the core once it has been located, thus reducing the radiation levels in the primary cooling loop.

Each fuel bundle is a cylinder assembled from thin tubes filled with ceramic pellets of uranium oxide fuel (fuel elements). In older designs, the bundle had 28 or 37 half-meter-long fuel elements with 12–13 such assemblies lying end-to-end in a pressure tube. The newer CANFLEX bundle has 43 fuel elements, with two element sizes (so the power rating can be increased without melting the hottest fuel elements). It is about 10 centimetres (3.9 in) in diameter, 50 centimetres (20 in) long, weighs about 20 kilograms (44 lb), and is intended to eventually replace the 37-element bundle. To allow the neutrons to flow freely between the bundles, the tubes and bundles are made of neutron-transparent zircaloy (zirconium + 2.5% wt niobium).

=== Purpose of using heavy water ===
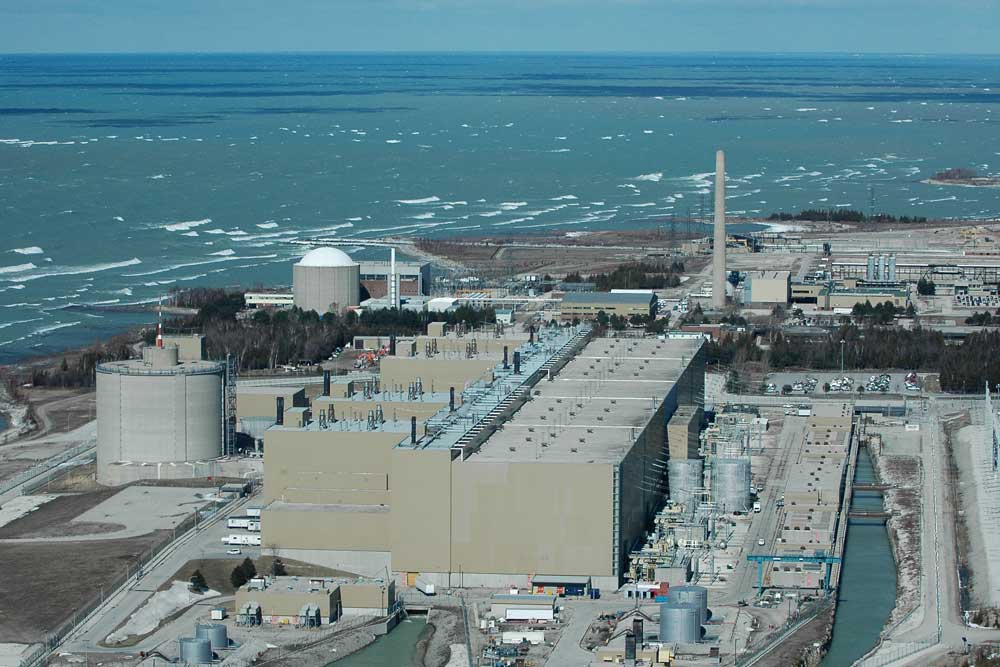
Bruce Nuclear Generating Station, operating eight CANDU reactors

Natural uranium is a mix of isotopes: approximately 99.28% uranium-238 and 0.72% uranium-235 by atom fraction. Nuclear power reactors are usually operated at constant power for long periods of time, which requires a constant rate of fission over time. In order to keep the fission rate constant, the neutrons released by fission must produce an equal number of fissions in other fuel atoms. This balance is referred to as criticality. Neutrons released by nuclear fission are fairly energetic and are not readily absorbed (or "captured") by the surrounding fissile material. In order to improve the capture rate, the neutron energy must be reduced, or moderated, to be as low as possible. In practice, the lower energy limit is the energy where the neutrons are in thermal equilibrium with the moderator. When neutrons approach this lower energy limit, they are referred to as thermal neutrons.

During moderation it helps to separate the neutrons and uranium, since ^{238}U has a large affinity for intermediate-energy neutrons ("resonance" absorption), but is only easily fissioned by the few energetic neutrons above ≈1.5–2 MeV. Since most of the fuel material is usually ^{238}U, most reactor designs are based on thin fuel rods separated by moderator, allowing the neutrons to travel in the moderator before entering the fuel again. More neutrons are released than the minimum needed to maintain the chain reaction; when uranium-238 absorbs neutrons, plutonium is created, which helps to make up for the depletion of uranium-235. Eventually the build-up of fission products that are more neutron-absorbing than ^{238}U slows the reaction and calls for refuelling.

Light water makes an excellent moderator: the light hydrogen atoms are very close in mass to a neutron and can absorb a lot of energy in a single collision (like a collision of two billiard balls). However, light hydrogen can absorb neutrons, reducing the number available to react with the small amount of ^{235}U in natural uranium, preventing criticality. In order to allow criticality, the fuel must be enriched, increasing the amount of ^{235}U to a usable level. In light-water reactors, the fuel is typically enriched to between 2% and 5% ^{235}U (the leftover fraction with less ^{235}U is called depleted uranium). Enrichment facilities are expensive to build and operate. They may also pose a proliferation concern, as they can be used to enrich the ^{235}U much further, up to weapons-grade material (90% or more ^{235}U). This can be remedied if the fuel is supplied and reprocessed by an internationally approved supplier.

The main advantage of heavy water moderator over light water is the reduced absorption of the neutrons that sustain the chain reaction, allowing a lower concentration of fissile atoms (to the point of using unenriched natural uranium fuel). Deuterium ("heavy hydrogen") already has the extra neutron that light hydrogen would absorb, reducing the tendency to capture neutrons. Deuterium has twice the mass of a single neutron (vs light hydrogen, which has about the same mass); the mismatch means that more collisions are needed to moderate the neutrons, requiring a larger thickness of moderator between the fuel rods. This increases the size of the reactor core and the leakage of neutrons. It is also the practical reason for the calandria design, otherwise, a very large pressure vessel would be needed. The low ^{235}U density in natural uranium also implies that less of the fuel will be consumed before the fission rate drops too low to sustain criticality, because the ratio of ^{235}U to fission products + ^{238}U is lower. In CANDU most of the moderator is at lower temperatures than in other designs, reducing the spread of speeds and the overall speed of the moderator particles. This means that most of the neutrons will end up at a lower energy and be more likely to cause fission, so CANDU not only "burns" natural uranium, but it does so more effectively as well. Overall, CANDU reactors use 30–40% less mined uranium than light-water reactors per unit of electricity produced. This is a major advantage of the heavy-water design; it not only requires less fuel, but as the fuel does not have to be enriched, it is much less expensive as well.

A further unique feature of heavy-water moderation is the greater stability of the chain reaction. This is due to the relatively low binding energy of the deuterium nucleus (2.2 MeV), leading to some energetic neutrons and especially gamma rays breaking the deuterium nuclei apart to produce extra neutrons. Both gammas produced directly by fission and by the decay of fission fragments have enough energy, and the half-lives of the fission fragments range from seconds to hours or even years. The slow response of these gamma-generated neutrons delays the response of the reactor and gives the operators extra time in case of an emergency. Since gamma rays travel for meters through water, an increased rate of chain reaction in one part of the reactor will produce a response from the rest of the reactor, allowing various negative feedbacks to stabilize the reaction.

On the other hand, the fission neutrons are thoroughly slowed down before they reach another fuel rod, meaning that it takes neutrons a longer time to get from one part of the reactor to the other. Thus if the chain reaction accelerates in one section of the reactor, the change will propagate itself only slowly to the rest of the core, giving time to respond in an emergency. The independence of the neutrons' energies from the nuclear fuel used is what allows such fuel flexibility in a CANDU reactor, since every fuel bundle will experience the same environment and affect its neighbors in the same way, whether the fissile material is uranium-235, uranium-233 or plutonium.

Canada developed the heavy-water-moderated design in the post–World War II era to explore nuclear energy while lacking access to enrichment facilities. War-era enrichment systems were extremely expensive to build and operate, whereas the heavy water solution allowed the use of natural uranium in the experimental ZEEP reactor. A much less expensive enrichment system was developed, but the United States classified work on the cheaper gas centrifuge process. The CANDU was therefore designed to use natural uranium.

== Safety features ==
The CANDU includes several active and passive safety features in its design. Some of these are a side effect of the physical layout of the system.

CANDU designs have a positive void coefficient, as well as a small power coefficient, normally considered bad in reactor design. This implies that steam generated in the coolant will increase the reaction rate, which in turn would generate more steam. This is one of the many reasons for the cooler mass of moderator in the calandria, as even a serious steam incident in the core would not have a major impact on the overall moderation cycle. Only if the moderator itself starts to boil would there be any significant effect, and the large thermal mass ensures that this will occur slowly. The deliberately "sluggish" response of the fission process in CANDU allows controllers more time to diagnose and deal with problems.

The fuel channels can only maintain criticality if they are mechanically sound. If the temperature of the fuel bundles increases to the point where they are mechanically unstable, their horizontal layout means that they will bend under gravity, shifting the layout of the bundles and reducing the efficiency of the reactions. Because the original fuel arrangement is optimal for a chain reaction, and the natural uranium fuel has little excess reactivity, any significant deformation will stop the inter-fuel pellet fission reaction. This will not stop heat production from fission product decay, which would continue to supply a considerable heat output. If this process further weakens the fuel bundles, the pressure tube they are in will eventually bend far enough to touch the calandria tube, allowing heat to be transferred into the moderator tank. The moderator vessel has a considerable thermal capability on its own and is normally kept relatively cool.

Heat generated by fission products would initially be at about 7% of full reactor power, which requires significant cooling. The CANDU designs have several emergency cooling systems, as well as having limited self-pumping capability through thermal means (the steam generator is well above the reactor). Even in the event of a catastrophic accident and core meltdown, the fuel is not critical in light water. This means that cooling the core with water from nearby sources will not add to the reactivity of the fuel mass.

Normally the rate of fission is controlled by light-water compartments called liquid zone controllers, which absorb excess neutrons, and by adjuster rods, which can be raised or lowered in the core to control the neutron flux. These are used for normal operation, allowing the controllers to adjust reactivity across the fuel mass, as different portions would normally burn at different rates depending on their position. The adjuster rods can also be used to slow or stop criticality. Because these rods are inserted into the low-pressure calandria, not the high-pressure fuel tubes, they would not be "ejected" by steam, a design issue for many pressurized-water reactors.

There are two independent, fast-acting safety shutdown systems as well. Shutoff rods are held above the reactor by electromagnets and drop under gravity into the core to quickly end criticality. This system works even in the event of a complete power failure, as the electromagnets only hold the rods out of the reactor when power is available. A secondary system injects a high-pressure gadolinium nitrate neutron absorber solution into the calandria.

== Fuel cycle ==
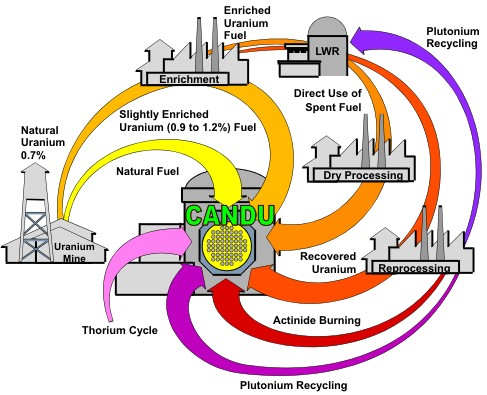
Range of possible CANDU fuel cycles: CANDU reactors can accept a variety of fuel types, including the used fuel from light-water reactors.

A heavy-water design can sustain a chain reaction with a lower concentration of fissile atoms than light-water reactors, allowing it to use some alternative fuels; for example, "recovered uranium" (RU) from used LWR fuel. CANDU was designed for natural uranium with only 0.7% ^{235}U, so RU with 0.9% ^{235}U is a comparatively rich fuel. This extracts a further 30–40% energy from the uranium. The Qinshan CANDU reactor in China has used RU. The DUPIC (Direct Use of spent PWR fuel in CANDU) process under development can recycle it even without reprocessing. The fuel is sintered in air (oxidized), then in hydrogen (reduced) to break it into a powder, which is then formed into CANDU fuel pellets.

CANDU reactors can also breed fuel from the more abundant thorium. This is being investigated by India to take advantage of its natural thorium reserves.

CANDU reactors may also utilize a mix of uranium and plutonium oxides (MOX fuel), the plutonium either from dismantled nuclear weapons or reprocessed reactor fuel. The mix of isotopes in reprocessed plutonium is not attractive for weapons, but can be used as fuel (instead of being simply nuclear waste), while consuming weapons-grade plutonium eliminates a proliferation hazard. If the aim is explicitly to utilize plutonium or other actinides from spent fuel, then special inert-matrix fuels are proposed to do this more efficiently than MOX. Since they contain no uranium, these fuels do not breed any extra plutonium.

== Economics ==
The neutron economy of heavy-water moderation and precise control of on-line refueling allow CANDU to use a wide range of fuels other than enriched uranium, e.g., natural uranium, reprocessed uranium, thorium, plutonium, and used LWR fuel. Given the expense of enrichment, this can make fuel much cheaper. There is an initial investment into the tonnes of 99.75% pure heavy water to fill the core and heat-transfer system. In the case of the Darlington plant, costs released as part of a freedom of information act request put the overnight cost of the plant (four reactors totalling 3,512 MW_{e} net capacity) at $5.117 billion CAD (about US$4.2 billion at early-1990s exchange rates). Total capital costs including interest were $14.319 billion CAD (about US$11.9 billion) with the heavy water accounting for $1.528 billion, or 11%, of this.

Since heavy water is less efficient than light water at slowing neutrons, CANDU needs a larger moderator-to-fuel ratio and a larger core for the same power output. Although a calandria-based core is cheaper to build, its size increases the cost for standard features like the containment building. Generally nuclear plant construction and operations are ≈65% of overall lifetime cost; for CANDU, costs are dominated by construction even more. Fueling CANDU is cheaper than other reactors, costing only ≈10% of the total, so the overall price per kWh electricity is comparable.

When first introduced, CANDUs offered much better capacity factor (ratio of power generated to what would be generated by running at full power, 100% of the time) than LWRs of a similar generation. The light-water designs spent, on average, about half the time being refueled or maintained. Since the 1980s, dramatic improvements in LWR outage management have narrowed the gap, with several units achieving capacity factors ~90% and higher, with an overall US fleet performance of 92% in 2010. The latest-generation CANDU 6 reactors have an 88–90% CF, but overall performance is dominated by the older Canadian units with CFs on the order of 80%. Refurbished units had historically demonstrated poor performance, on the order of 65%. This has since improved with the return of Bruce A units 1 and 2 to operation, which have post-refurbishment (2013+) capacity factors of 90.78% and 90.38%, respectively.

Some CANDU plants suffered from cost overruns during construction, often from external factors such as government action. For instance, imposed construction delays led to roughly a doubling of the cost of the Darlington Nuclear Generating Station near Toronto, Ontario. Technical problems and redesigns added about another billion to the resulting $14.4 billion price. In 2002 two CANDU 6 reactors at Qinshan in China were completed on-schedule and on-budget, an achievement attributed to tight control over scope and schedule.

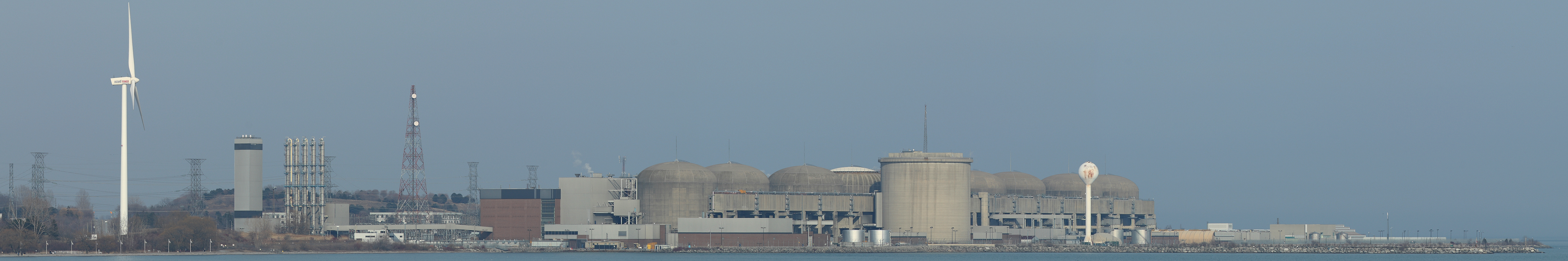
Pickering Nuclear Generating Station The station consists of four operating and four shut down CANDU reactors housed in domed containment buildings. The cylindrical Vacuum Building is an additional safety system where steam is condensed in the event of a major leak.

== Tritium production ==
Tritium is a radioactive isotope of hydrogen with a half-life of 12.3 years. Due to this short half-life, it does not persist in nature. It is continuously produced in small amounts, about 4 kg per year globally, by cosmic ray interactions in the upper atmosphere. This is not recovered for industrial or research use.

Tritium is also generated in the fuel of all nuclear fission reactors. In CANDU reactors, additional tritium is generated in the heavy water coolant and moderator due to neutron capture in deuterium. Heavy water is relatively immune to neutron capture, but a small amount of the deuterium turns into tritium in this way. A CANDU reactor's production of tritium is therefore greater per unit of power production than other widely deployed reactor types in commercial power operation.

This tritium is extracted from some CANDU plants in Canada, mainly to improve safety in case of heavy-water leakage. The gas is stored and used in a variety of commercial products, notably "powerless" lighting systems and medical devices. It also has use in research.

=== Nuclear fusion ===
Fusion power is a developmental energy technology that operates on different principles to nuclear fission reactors like CANDU. However, the most actively explored fuel for possible future fusion power plants is deuterium and tritium. Tritium is much scarcer than deuterium, which is a component of seawater, making tritium supply a key limit on fusion research and deployment. Nuclear fission reactors are currently the main source of tritium, and in ordinary commercial power operation CANDU reactors specifically are the largest producers. The CANDU fleet is therefore the main source of tritium for fusion research and is expected to be the main source of start-up tritium for possible future fusion power plants.

Future demands for tritium appear to outstrip production, in particular the demands of future generations of experimental fusion reactors like ITER, with up to 10kg of tritium being required in order to start up a fusion reactor and so dozens of kilograms being required for a fleet. Between 1.5 to 2.1 kilograms (3.3 to 4.6 lb) of tritium were recovered annually at the Darlington separation facility in Canada by 2003, of which a minor fraction was sold. Consequently, the Canadian Nuclear Laboratories in 2024 announced a decades-long program to refurbish existing CANDU plants and equip them with tritium breeding facilities.

=== Safety ===
Tritium is considered a weak radionuclide because of its low-energy radioactive emissions (beta particle energy up to 18.6 keV). The beta particles travel 6 mm in air and only penetrate skin up to 6 micrometers. If inhaled or ingested, tritium has a short elimination half-life of 10-12 days which can be accelerated by the ingestion of large volumes of water.

With production on the scale of 1 kg per year, tritium is a very small proportion of CANDU nuclear waste by both weight and radioactivity. Some of the tritium produced by CANDU reactors escapes into containment. Most is recovered, but about 1% escapes containment. Although higher than in other reactor types that produce less tritium, this is considered a routine radioactive emission. Tritium levels in the environment around a plant are monitored. Typical emissions from CANDU plants in Canada are less than 1% of the national regulatory limit, based on ICRP guidelines.

Tritium emission by CANDU plants has been a cause of civil society concern. In 2007 Greenpeace published a critique of tritium emissions from Canadian nuclear power plants by Ian Fairlie. This report was criticized by Canadian Radiation Protection Association founding president Richard Osborne.

== Nuclear nonproliferation ==
CANDU reactors have features that may make them relatively attractive as sources for plutonium for nuclear weapons and raise concerns about their potential contribution to nuclear proliferation. In normal operations, the isotopic composition of plutonium contained in spent fuel is far from weapons-grade, but the ability to load and unload fuel while the reactor is operating allows for production of very low burnup spent fuel containing weapon-grade plutonium. However, the fuel handling machines for CANDU reactors are not designed to operate at high throughput and safeguards measures at CANDU reactors make such operations relatively easy to detect.

The plutonium for India's first nuclear detonation, Operation Smiling Buddha in 1974, was produced in a CIRUS reactor supplied by Canada and partially paid for by the Canadian government using heavy water supplied by the United States. In addition to its two PHWR reactors, India has some safeguarded pressurised heavy-water reactors (PHWRs) based on the CANDU design, and two safeguarded light-water reactors supplied by the US. Plutonium has been extracted from the spent fuel from all of these reactors; India mainly relies on an Indian designed and built military reactor called Dhruva. The design is believed to be derived from the CIRUS reactor, with the Dhruva being scaled-up for more efficient plutonium production. It is this reactor which is thought to have produced the plutonium for India's more recent (1998) Operation Shakti nuclear tests.

The 1998 Operation Shakti test series in India included one bomb of about 45 kilotons of TNT (190 TJ) yield that India has publicly claimed was a hydrogen bomb. An offhand comment in the BARC publication Heavy Water – Properties, Production and Analysis appears to suggest that the tritium was extracted from the heavy water in the CANDU and PHWR reactors in commercial operation. Janes Intelligence Review quotes the Chairman of the Indian Atomic Energy Commission as admitting to the tritium extraction plant, but refusing to comment on its use. India is also capable of creating tritium more efficiently by irradiation of lithium-6 in reactors.

In 1985 what was then Ontario Hydro sparked controversy in Ontario due to its proposed sale of tritium to the United States. The plan, by law, involved sales for non-military applications only, but some speculated that the exports could have freed American tritium for the United States nuclear weapons program. Ontario Hydro began extracting tritium from CANDU in October 1988 and by the end of the Cold War Canada had not actually exported any CANDU-derived tritium.

== History ==
The CANDU development effort has gone through four major stages over time. The first systems were experimental and prototype machines of limited power. These were replaced by a second generation of machines of 500 to 600 MW_{e} (the CANDU 6), a series of larger machines of 900 MW_{e}, and finally developing into the CANDU 9 and ACR-1000 effort.

=== Early efforts ===
The first heavy-water-moderated design in Canada was the ZEEP, which started operation just after the end of World War II. ZEEP was joined by several other experimental machines, including the NRX in 1947 and NRU in 1957. These efforts led to the first CANDU-type reactor, the Nuclear Power Demonstration (NPD), in Rolphton, Ontario. It was intended as a proof-of-concept and rated for only 22 MW_{e}, a very low power for a commercial power reactor. NPD produced the first nuclear-generated electricity in Canada and ran successfully from 1962 to 1987.

The second CANDU was the Douglas Point reactor, a more powerful version rated at roughly 200 MW_{e} and located near Kincardine, Ontario. It went into service in 1968 and ran until 1984. Uniquely among CANDU stations, Douglas Point had an oil-filled window with a view of the east reactor face, even when the reactor was operating. Douglas Point was originally planned to be a two-unit station, but the second unit was cancelled because of the success of the larger 515 MW_{e} units at Pickering.

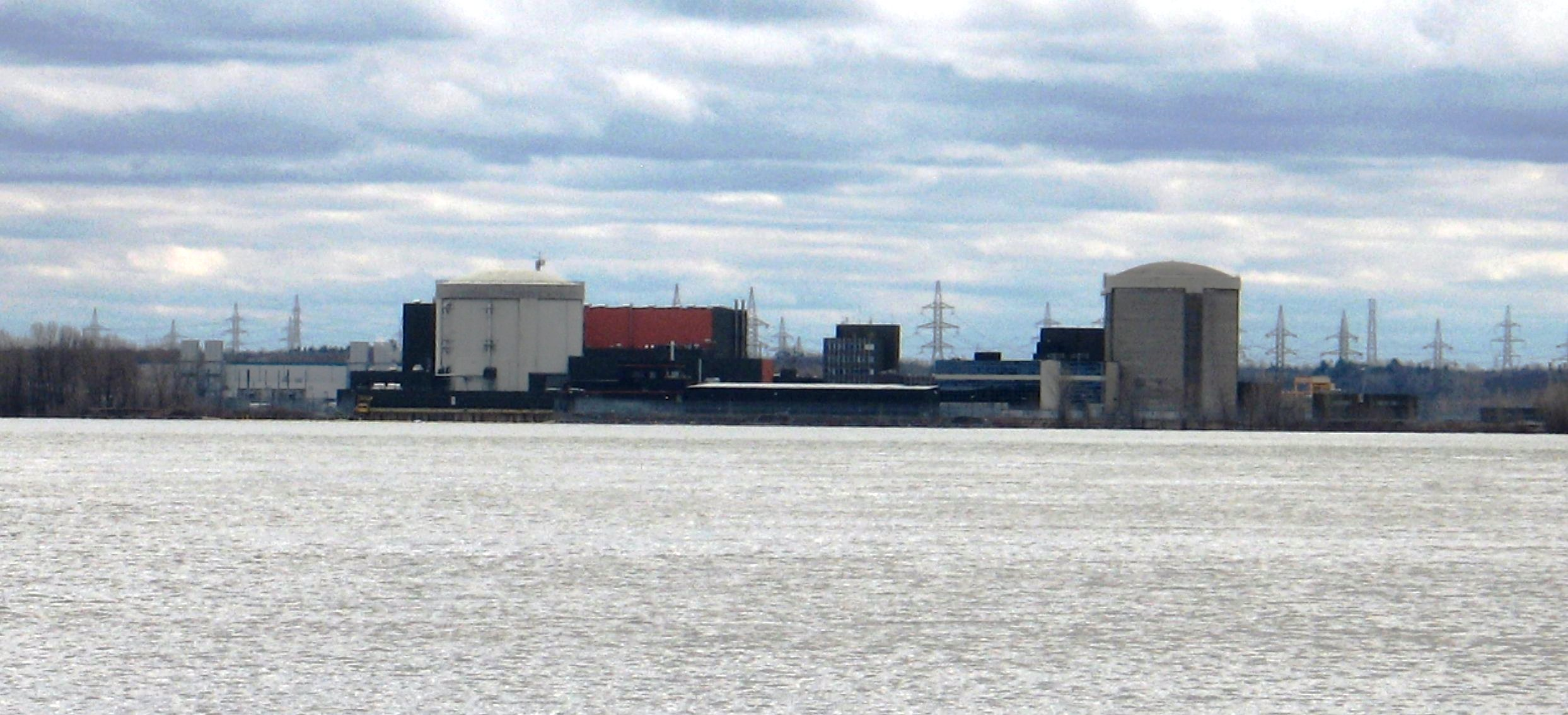
Gentilly-1 (right) and Gentilly-2 (left)

Gentilly-1, in Bécancour, Quebec, near Trois-Rivières, Quebec, was also an experimental version of CANDU, using a boiling light-water coolant and vertical pressure tubes, but was not considered successful and closed after seven years of fitful operation. Gentilly-2, a CANDU-6 reactor, began operating in 1983. Following statements from the in-coming Parti Québécois government in September 2012 that Gentilly would close, the operator, Hydro-Québec, decided to cancel a previously announced refurbishment of the plant and announced its shutdown at the end of 2012, citing economic reasons for the decision. The company has started a 50-year decommissioning process estimated to cost $1.8 billion.

In parallel with the classic CANDU design, experimental variants were being developed. WR-1, located at the AECL's Whiteshell Laboratories in Pinawa, Manitoba, used vertical pressure tubes and organic oil as the primary coolant. The oil used has a higher boiling point than water, allowing the reactor to operate at higher temperatures and lower pressures than a conventional reactor. WR-1's outlet temperature was about 490 °C compared to the CANDU 6's nominal 310 °C; the higher temperature and thus thermodynamic efficiency offsets to some degree the fact that oils have about half the heat capacity of water. The higher temperatures also result in more efficient conversion to steam, and ultimately, electricity. WR-1 operated successfully for many years and promised a significantly higher efficiency than water-cooled versions.

=== 600 MW_{e} designs ===
The successes at NPD and Douglas Point led to the decision to construct the first multi-unit station in Pickering, Ontario. Pickering A, consisting of Units 1 to 4, went into service in 1971. Pickering B with units 5 to 8 came online in 1983, giving a full-station capacity of 4,120 MW_{e}. The station is very close to the city of Toronto, in order to reduce transmission costs.

A series of improvements to the basic Pickering design led to the CANDU 6 design, which first went into operation in the early 1980s. CANDU 6 was essentially a version of the Pickering power plant that was redesigned to be able to be built in single-reactor units. CANDU 6 was used in several installations outside Ontario, including the Gentilly-2 in Quebec, and Point Lepreau Nuclear Generating Station in New Brunswick. CANDU 6 forms the majority of foreign CANDU systems, including the designs exported to Argentina, Romania, China and South Korea. Only India operates a CANDU system that is not based on the CANDU 6 design.

=== 900 MW_{e} designs ===
The economics of nuclear power plants generally scale well with size. This improvement at larger sizes is offset by the sudden appearance of large quantities of power on the grid, which leads to a lowering of electricity prices through supply and demand effects. Predictions in the late 1960s suggested that growth in electricity demand would overwhelm these downward pricing pressures, leading most designers to introduce plants in the 1000 MW_{e} range.

Pickering A was quickly followed by such an upscaling effort for the Bruce Nuclear Generating Station, constructed in stages between 1970 and 1987. It is the largest nuclear facility in North America and second largest in the world (after Kashiwazaki-Kariwa in Japan), with eight reactors at around 800 MW_{e} each, in total 6,232 MW (net) and 7,276 MW (gross). Another, smaller, upscaling led to the Darlington Nuclear Generating Station design, similar to the Bruce plant, but delivering about 880 MW_{e} per reactor in a four-reactor station.

As was the case for the development of the Pickering design into the CANDU 6, the Bruce design was also developed into the similar CANDU 9. Like the CANDU 6, the CANDU 9 is essentially a repackaging of the Bruce design, so that it can be built as a single-reactor unit. No CANDU 9 reactors have been built.

=== Generation III+ designs ===
Through the 1980s and 1990s the nuclear power market suffered a major crash, with few new plants being constructed in North America or Europe. Design work continued throughout, and new design concepts were introduced that dramatically improved safety, capital costs, economics and overall performance. These generation III+ and generation IV machines became a topic of considerable interest in the early 2000s, as it appeared that a nuclear renaissance was underway and large numbers of new reactors would be built over the next decade.

AECL had been working on a design known as the ACR-700, using elements of the latest versions of the CANDU 6 and CANDU 9, with a design power of 700 MW_{e}. During the nuclear renaissance, the upscaling seen in the earlier years re-expressed itself, and the ACR-700 was developed into the 1200 MW_{e} ACR-1000. ACR-1000 is the next-generation (officially, "generation III+") CANDU technology, which makes some significant modifications to the existing CANDU design.

The main change, and the most radical among the CANDU generations, is the use of pressurized light water as the coolant. This significantly reduces the cost of implementing the primary cooling loop, which no longer has to be filled with expensive heavy water. The ACR-1000 uses about 1/3rd the heavy water needed in earlier-generation designs. It also eliminates tritium production in the coolant loop, the major source of tritium leaks in operational CANDU designs. The redesign also allows a slightly negative void reactivity, a major design goal of all Gen III+ machines.

The design also requires the use of slightly enriched uranium, enriched by about 1 or 2%. The main reason for this is to increase the burn-up ratio, allowing bundles to remain in the reactor longer, so that only a third as much spent fuel is produced. This also has effects on operational costs and timetables, as the refuelling frequency is reduced. As is the case with earlier CANDU designs, the ACR-1000 also offers online refuelling.

Outside of the reactor, the ACR-1000 has a number of design changes that are expected to dramatically lower capital and operational costs. Primary among these changes is the design lifetime of 60 years, which dramatically lowers the price of the electricity generated over the lifetime of the plant. The design also has an expected capacity factor of 90%. Higher-pressure steam generators and turbines improve efficiency downstream of the reactor.

Many of the operational design changes were also applied to the existing CANDU 6 to produce the Enhanced CANDU 6. Also known as CANDU 6e or EC 6, this was an evolutionary upgrade of the CANDU 6 design with a gross output of 740 MW_{e} per unit. The reactors are designed with a lifetime of over 50 years, with a mid-life program to replace some of the key components e.g. the fuel channels. The projected average annual capacity factor is more than 90%. Improvements to construction techniques (including modular, open-top assembly) decrease construction costs. The CANDU 6e is designed to operate at power settings as low as 50%, allowing them to adjust to load demand much better than the previous designs.

The Advanced Fuel CANDU Reactor (AFCR) was to be a further development of EC6 design with 740 MWe. It was intended to use recycled uranium and thorium-based fuels and was to be developed by joint venture of SNC-Lavalin, China National Nuclear Corporation and Shanghai Electric, but thorium designs were not pursued in light of the China Academy of Sciences (CAS) project on thorium-breeding molten-salt reactor.

AtkinsRéalis is developing the next design CANDU, known as CANDU Monark. It is a Generation III+ reactor with 1000MW. The design is based on mainly ACR-1000 and EC6.

=== Sales efforts in Canada ===
By most measures, the CANDU is "the Ontario reactor". The system was developed almost entirely in Ontario, and only two experimental designs were built in other provinces. Of the 29 commercial CANDU reactors built, 22 are in Ontario. Of these 22, a number of reactors have been removed from service. Two new CANDU reactors have been proposed for Darlington with Canadian government help with financing, but these plans ended in 2009 due to high costs.

AECL has heavily marketed CANDU within Canada, but has found a limited reception. To date, only two non-experimental reactors have been built in other provinces, one each in Quebec and New Brunswick, other provinces have concentrated on hydro and coal-fired plants. Several Canadian provinces have developed large amounts of hydro power. Alberta and Saskatchewan do not have extensive hydro resources, and use mainly fossil fuels to generate electric power.

Interest has been expressed in Western Canada, where CANDU reactors are being considered as heat and electricity sources for the energy-intensive oil sands extraction process, which currently uses natural gas. Energy Alberta Corporation announced 27 August 2007 that they had applied for a licence to build a new nuclear plant at Lac Cardinal (30 km west of the town of Peace River, Alberta), with two ACR-1000 reactors going online in 2017 producing 2.2 gigawatts (electric). A 2007 parliamentary review suggested placing the development efforts on hold. The company was later purchased by Bruce Power, who proposed expanding the plant to four units of a total 4.4 gigawatts. These plans were upset and Bruce later withdrew its application for the Lac Cardinal, proposing instead a new site about 60 km away. The plans are currently moribund after a wide consultation with the public demonstrated that while about 1/5 of the population were open to reactors, 1/4 were opposed.

=== Foreign sales ===
During the 1970s, the international nuclear sales market was extremely competitive, with many national nuclear companies being supported by their governments' foreign embassies. In addition, the pace of construction in the United States had meant that cost overruns and delayed completion was generally over, and subsequent reactors would be cheaper. Canada, a relatively new player on the international market, had numerous disadvantages in these efforts. The CANDU was deliberately designed to reduce the need for very large machined parts, making it suitable for construction by countries without a major industrial base. Sales efforts have had their most success in countries that could not locally build designs from other firms.

In the late 1970s, AECL noted that each reactor sale would employ 3,600 Canadians and result in $300 million in balance-of-payments income. These sales efforts were aimed primarily at countries being run by dictatorships or similar, a fact that led to serious concerns in parliament. These efforts also led to a scandal when it was discovered millions of dollars had been given to foreign sales agents, with little or no record of who they were, or what they did to earn the money. This led to a Royal Canadian Mounted Police investigation after questions were raised about sales efforts in Argentina, and new regulations on full disclosure of fees for future sales.

CANDU's first success was the sale of early CANDU designs to India. In 1963, an agreement was signed for export of a 200 MWe power reactor based on the Douglas Point reactor. The success of the deal led to the 1966 sale of a second reactor of the same design. The first reactor, then known as RAPP-1 for "Rajasthan Atomic Power Project", began operation in 1972. A serious problem with cracking of the reactor's end shield led to the reactor being shut down for long periods, and the reactor was finally downrated to 100 MW. Construction of the RAPP-2 reactor was still underway when India detonated its first atomic bomb in 1974, leading to Canada ending nuclear dealings with the country. Part of the sales agreement was a technology transfer process. When Canada withdrew from development, India continued construction of CANDU-like plants across the country. By 2010, CANDU-based reactors were operational at the following sites: Kaiga (3), Kakrapar (2), Madras (2), Narora (2), Rajasthan (6), and Tarapur (2).

In Pakistan, the Karachi Nuclear Power Plant with a gross capacity of 137 MW_{e} was built between 1966 and 1971.

In 1972, AECL submitted a design based on the Pickering plant to Argentina's Comision Nacional de Energia Atomica process, in partnership with the Italian company Italimpianti. High inflation during construction led to massive losses, and efforts to re-negotiate the deal were interrupted by the March 1976 coup led by General Videla. The Embalse Nuclear Power Station began commercial operation in January 1984. There have been ongoing negotiations to open more CANDU 6 reactors in the country, including a 2007 deal between Canada, China and Argentina, but to date no firm plans have been announced.. The refurbishment of the nuclear power plant was carried out between 2015 and 2018, an the plant returned to operations 2019. The refurbishment extended the plant’s operational life by 30 years and boosted its output by 35 MWe.

A licensing agreement with Romania was signed in 1977, selling the CANDU 6 design for $5 million per reactor for the first four reactors, and then $2 million each for the next twelve. In addition, Canadian companies would supply a varying amount of equipment for the reactors, about $100 million of the first reactor's $800 million price tag, and then falling over time. In 1980, Nicolae Ceaușescu asked for a modification to provide goods instead of cash, in exchange the amount of Canadian content was increased and a second reactor would be built with Canadian help. Economic troubles in the country worsened throughout the construction phase. The first reactor of the Cernavodă Nuclear Power Plant only came online in April 1996, a decade after its December 1985 predicted startup. Further loans were arranged for completion of the second reactor, which went online in November 2007.

In January 1975, a deal was announced for a single CANDU 6 reactor to be built in South Korea, now known as the Wolsong-1 Power Reactor. Construction started in 1977 and commercial operation began in April 1983. In December 1990 a further deal was announced for three additional units at the same site, which began operation in the period 1997–1999. South Korea also negotiated development and technology transfer deals with Westinghouse for their advanced System-80 reactor design, and all future development is based on locally built versions of this reactor.

In June 1998, construction started on a CANDU 6 reactor in Qinshan China Qinshan Nuclear Power Plant, as Phase III (units 4 and 5) of the planned 11 unit facility. Commercial operation began in December 2002 and July 2003, respectively. These are the first heavy water reactors in China. Qinshan was the first CANDU-6 project to use open-top reactor building construction, and the first project where commercial operation began earlier than the projected date.

=== Economic performance ===
The cost of electricity from any power plant can be calculated by roughly the same selection of factors: capital costs for construction or the payments on loans made to secure that capital, the cost of fuel on a per-watt-hour basis, and fixed and variable maintenance fees. In the case of nuclear power, one normally includes two additional costs, the cost of permanent waste disposal, and the cost of decommissioning the plant when its useful lifetime is over. Generally, the capital costs dominate the price of nuclear power, as the amount of power produced is so large that it overwhelms the cost of fuel and maintenance. The World Nuclear Association calculates that the cost of fuel, including all processing, accounts for less than one cent (US$0.01) per kWh.

Information on economic performance on CANDU is somewhat lopsided; the majority of reactors are in Ontario, which is also the "most public" among the major CANDU operators. Several anti-nuclear organizations like the Ontario Clean Air Alliance (OCAA) and Pembina have claimed that every CANDU design in Ontario went over budget by at least 25%, and average over 150% higher than estimated. However, this is predicated on using "dollar of the day" figures that are not adjusted for inflation. With inflation accounted for, all plants were on or under budget with the exception of Darlington. Even accounting for inflation, Darlington went far over budget, at almost double the original estimate, but this project was stopped in-progress thereby incurring additional interest charges during a period of high interest rates, which is a special situation that was not expected to repeat itself.

In the 1980s, the pressure tubes in the Pickering A reactors were replaced ahead of design life due to unexpected deterioration caused by hydrogen embrittlement. Extensive inspection and maintenance has avoided this problem in later reactors.

All the Pickering A and Bruce A reactors were shut down in 1999 in order to focus on restoring operational performance in the later generations at Pickering, Bruce, and Darlington. Before restarting the Pickering A reactors, OPG undertook a limited refurbishment program. The original cost and time estimates based on inadequate project scope development were greatly below the actual time and cost and it was determined that Pickering units 2 and 3 would not be restarted for commercial reasons.

These overruns were repeated at Bruce, with Units 3 and 4 running 90% over budget. Similar overruns were experienced at Point Lepreau, and Gentilly-2 plant was shut down on 28 December 2012.

Based on the projected capital costs, and the low cost of fuel and in-service maintenance, in 1994 power from CANDU was predicted to be well under 5 cents/kWh.

In 1999, Ontario Hydro was broken up and its generation facilities re-formed into Ontario Power Generation (OPG). In order to make the successor companies more attractive for private investors, $19.4 billion in "stranded debt" was placed in the control of the Ontario Electricity Financial Corporation. This debt is slowly paid down through a variety of sources, including a 0.7-cent/kWh tariff on all power, all income taxes paid by all operating companies, and all dividends paid by the OPG and Hydro One.

In February 2026, the major refurbishment project of all four units of the Darlington plant was completed, under budget and four months ahead of schedule.

Darlington Units 1, 3 and 4 have operated with an average lifetime annual capacity factor of 85% and Unit 2 with a capacity factor of 78%, As of 2010, refurbished units at Pickering and Bruce had lifetime capacity factors between 59 and 69%. This includes periods of several years while the units were shut down for the retubing and refurbishing. Post-refurbishment capacity factors are much higher with Bruce A1 at 90.78%, Bruce A2 at 90.38% (2013+), Pickering A1 at 71.18% and Pickering A4 at 70.38%. In 2009, Bruce A units 3 and 4 had capacity factors of 80.5% and 76.7% respectively, in a year when they had a major Vacuum Building outage.

=== Comparison of CANDU reactors ===
Comparison of CANDU reactors
Parameters	CANDU 3	CANDU 6	CANDU 9	ACR-700	ACR-1000	AFCR	CANDU 6e (EC6)
Reference							
Generation	II	II	II	III	III+	III+	III+
Moderator	D_{2}O	D_{2}O	D_{2}O	D_{2}O	D_{2}O	D_{2}O	D_{2}O
Coolant	D_{2}O	D_{2}O	D_{2}O	D_{2}O	H_{2}O	D_{2}O	D_{2}O
Number of Fuel Channels	232	380	600	284	520	380	380
Fuel	UO_{2}	UO_{2}	UO_{2}	UO_{2}	UO_{2}	UO_{2}	UO_{2}
Number of elements in bundle	37	37	37	43	43	43	37
Number of bundles in channel	12	12	12	12		12	12
Number of steam generators	2	4	8	2	4	4	4
Number of heat transport pumps	2	4	4	4	4	4	4
Reactor outlet pressure (MPa)	10.0	10.3	10.3	11.9	11.6	9.89	9.89
Reactor outlet temperature (°C)	310	312	312	325	319	308	310
Reactor coolant flow rate (kg.s^{-1})	5300	7600	13500	6900	13100	28.6×380	28.5×380
Steam pressure (MPa)	4.7	4.7	5.1	6.4	6		
Steam temperature (°C)	260	260	265	281	275.5	260	260
Steam flow rate (kg.s^{-1})	700	1050	1610		1728		
Total fission heat (MW)	1441	2156	3394				
Net heat to steam cycle (MW)	1390	2060	3347	2064	3200	2084	2084
Gross turbine generator output (MW)	470	676	1121	731	1165		
Net electrical output (MW)	450	626	1031	680	1082	740	700

== CANDU power plants ==
Today there are 26 CANDU reactors in use around the world, and 18 "CANDU-derivatives" in India, developed from the CANDU design. After India detonated a nuclear bomb in 1974, Canada stopped nuclear dealings with India and India developed 18 operational and 1 under construction "CANDU-derivatives". The breakdown is:

List of operational, planned, and closed CANDU installations
Power plants			Reactor			Status	Notes	Ref
Unit	Country	Geolocation	Model	Design	Gen	Status	Notes	Ref
Nuclear Power Demonstration	Canada		CANDU	CANDU prototype	I	Permanent shutdown		
Douglas Point	Canada		CANDU	CANDU 200	I	Permanent shutdown		
Pickering A1	Canada		CANDU	CANDU 500A	II	Permanent shutdown		
Pickering A2	Canada		CANDU	CANDU 500A	II	Permanent shutdown		
Pickering A3	Canada		CANDU	CANDU 500A	II	Permanent shutdown		
Pickering A4	Canada		CANDU	CANDU 500A	II	Permanent shutdown		
Pickering B5	Canada		CANDU	CANDU 500B	II	Operational		
Pickering B6	Canada		CANDU	CANDU 500B	II	Operational		
Pickering B7	Canada		CANDU	CANDU 500B	II	Operational		
Pickering B8	Canada		CANDU	CANDU 500B	II	Operational		
Gentilly 1	Canada		CANDU	CANDU BLW-250	II	Permanent shutdown		
Gentilly 2	Canada		CANDU	CANDU 6	II	Permanent shutdown		
Bruce A1	Canada		CANDU	CANDU 791	II	Operational		
Bruce A2	Canada		CANDU	CANDU 791	II	Operational		
Bruce A3	Canada		CANDU	CANDU 750A	II	Operational		
Bruce A4	Canada		CANDU	CANDU 750A	II	Operational		
Bruce B5	Canada		CANDU	CANDU 750B	II	Operational		
Bruce B6	Canada		CANDU	CANDU 750B	II	Operational		
Bruce B7	Canada		CANDU	CANDU 750B	II	Operational		
Bruce B8	Canada		CANDU	CANDU 750B	II	Operational		
Darlington 1	Canada		CANDU	CANDU 850	II	Operational		
Darlington 2	Canada		CANDU	CANDU 850	II	Operational		
Darlington 3	Canada		CANDU	CANDU 850	II	Operational		
Darlington 4	Canada		CANDU	CANDU 850	II	Operational		
Point Lepreau	Canada		CANDU	CANDU 6	II	Operational		
Wolseong 1	South Korea		CANDU	CANDU 6	II	Permanent shutdown		
Wolseong 2	South Korea		CANDU	CANDU 6	II	Operational		
Wolseong 3	South Korea		CANDU	CANDU 6	II	Operational		
Wolseong 4	South Korea		CANDU	CANDU 6	II	Operational		
Qinshan III-1	China		CANDU	CANDU 6	II	Operational		
Qinshan III-2	China		CANDU	CANDU 6	II	Operational		
Rajasthan 1	India		CANDU	CANDU 200	I	Permanent shutdown		
Rajasthan 2	India		CANDU	CANDU 200	I	Operational		
Embalse	Argentina		CANDU	CANDU 6	II	Operational		
Cernavodă 1	Romania		CANDU	CANDU 6	II	Operational		
Cernavodă 2	Romania		CANDU	CANDU 6	II	Operational		
Cernavodă 3	Romania		CANDU	CANDU 6	II	Under construction		
Cernavodă 4	Romania		CANDU	CANDU 6	II	Under construction		
Cernavodă 5	Romania		CANDU	CANDU 6	II	Under construction	dormant partly constructed	
Karachi K1	Pakistan		CANDU	CANDU 200	I	Permanent shutdown		

=== Owners' group ===
Several Canadian operators of CANDU reactors formed the CANDU Reactors Owners' Group in 1984; they were later joined by international operators, and, in 2025, rebranded as Conexus Nuclear Inc.

The organization collaborates in several areas to promote the CANDU reactor technology:

1. research and development This included base funding for part of the research and development costs of AECL.
2. joint projects and services
3. nuclear safety and environmental affairs
4. information exchange

== See also ==
- ZEEP reactor
- Nuclear power in Canada
- List of nuclear reactors
- CANDU Owners Group
