= Atomic Energy of Canada Limited =

Canadian nuclear science laboratory

- Type: Crown corporation
- Industry: Nuclear power research
- Founded: 1952
- Headquarters: Chalk River, Ontario, Canada
- Key people: Fred Dermarkar (President and CEO)
- Revenue: ▲CA$1.485 billion (2024)
- Total assets: ▲CA$0.653 billion (2024)
- Number of employees: 3,500 worldwide
- Subsidiaries: Canadian Nuclear Laboratories
- Website: www.aecl.ca

Atomic Energy of Canada Limited (AECL, Énergie atomique du Canada limitée, EACL) is a Canadian Crown corporation and the largest nuclear science and technology laboratory in Canada. AECL developed the CANDU reactor technology starting in the 1950s, and in October 2011 licensed this technology to Candu Energy.

AECL describes its goal as ensuring that "Canadians and the world receive energy, environmental and economic benefits from nuclear science and technology – with confidence that nuclear safety and security are assured".

Until October 2011, AECL was also the vendor of CANDU technology, which it had exported worldwide. Throughout the 1960s–2000s AECL marketed and built CANDU facilities in India, South Korea, Argentina, Romania, and the People's Republic of China. It is a member of the World Nuclear Association trade group.

In addition, AECL manufactures nuclear medicine radioisotopes for supply to Nordion in Ottawa, Ontario, and is the world's largest supplier of molybdenum-99 for diagnostic tests, and cobalt-60 for cancer therapy.

AECL is funded through a combination of federal government appropriations and commercial revenue. In 2009, AECL received CA$651 (equivalent to $934.39 in 2025) million in federal support.

In October 2011 the federal government of Canada sold the commercial CANDU design and marketing business of AECL to Candu Energy for CA$15 million (including 15 years worth of royalties, the government could get back as much as CA$285 million). The sale entered the exclusive negotiation stage in February, a month after the other bidder, Bruce Power pulled out). Poor sales and cost overruns (CA$1.2 billion in the last five years) were reasons for the divestment though SNC-Lavalin expects to reverse that trend by focusing on new generation reactors. SNC-Lavalin Nuclear Inc, SNC's nuclear subsidiary is already part of Team CANDU, a group of five companies that manufacture and refurbish the CANDU reactors. The government will continue to own the Chalk River Laboratories (produces isotopes for medical imaging). The transaction puts 800 jobs at risk while improving job security for 1,200 employees. Due to safety concerns many countries are considering thorium nuclear reactors which AECL's CANDU reactors easily convert into (from uranium fuelled). Higher energy yields using thorium as the fuel (1 tonne (0.98 long tons; 1.1 short tons) of thorium produces the same amount of energy as 200 tonnes (200 long tons; 220 short tons) tons of uranium) also makes it more attractive. OMERS has also shown interest in the company.

== History ==
=== 1940s ===
AECL traces its heritage to the Second World War when a joint Canadian-British nuclear research laboratory, the Montreal Laboratory, was established in Montreal in 1942, under the National Research Council of Canada to develop a design for a nuclear reactor. Canadian firms had American contracts from the Manhattan Project; with Eldorado Gold Mines for mining and processing uranium ore and with by Consolidated Mining and Smelting (CMS) for a heavy water plant at Trail, British Columbia.

In 1944, approval was given by the federal government to begin with construction of the ZEEP (Zero Energy Experimental Pile) reactor at the Chalk River Nuclear Laboratories near Chalk River, Ontario, located on the Ottawa River approximately 190 km northwest of Ottawa. AECL was also involved in the development of associated technology such as the UTEC computer.

On September 5, 1945, the ZEEP reactor first went critical, achieving the first "self-sustained nuclear reaction outside the United States". ZEEP put Canada at the forefront of nuclear research in the world and was the instigator behind eventual development of the CANDU reactors, ZEEP having operated as a research reactor until the early 1970s.

In 1946 the Montreal research laboratory was closed and research was consolidated at Chalk River Laboratories. On July 22, 1947, the NRX (National Research Experimental) reactor, the most powerful reactor in the world at the time, went critical and was "used successfully for producing radioisotopes, undertaking fuels and materials development work for CANDU reactors, and providing neutrons for physics experiments".

=== 1950s ===
In 1952 AECL was formed by the government with a mandate to develop peaceful uses of nuclear energy.

On December 12, 1952, one of the world's first major reactor accidents occurred in the NRX reactor at AECL's Chalk River Laboratories, when a combination of human and mechanical error led to a temporary loss of control over the reactor's power level. Undercooling of the fuel channels led to a partial meltdown. This caused a hydrogen-oxygen explosion inside the calandria. Several fuel bundles experienced melting and ruptured, rendering much of the core interior unusable. The reactor building was contaminated, as well as an area of the Chalk River site, and millions of gallons of radioactive water accumulated in the reactor basement. This water was pumped to a waste management area of the Laboratories and monitored. Hundreds of military personnel from Canada and the U.S. (including naval officer and later U.S. President, LT James "Jimmy" Carter) were employed in the cleanup and disposal of the reactor debris.

The NRX was repaired, upgraded, and returned to service 14 months later and operated for another 40 years, finally being shut down in 1992. Throughout the 1950s the NRX was used by many researchers in the pioneering fields of neutron condensed matter physics, including Dr. Bertram Brockhouse, who shared the 1994 Nobel Prize in Physics for his work in developing the neutron scattering techniques.

The NRU opened in 1957. On November 3, 1957 the NRU (National Research Universal Reactor) first went critical. This was a natural-uranium fuelled, heavy-water moderated and cooled research reactor (converted to high-enriched-uranium fuel in the 1960s, and finally to low-enriched-uranium fuel in the 1990s). The NRU is a world-renowned research facility, producing about 60% of the world's supply of molybdenum-99, the principle isotope used for nuclear medical diagnosis. Canada also pioneered use of cobalt-60 for medical diagnosis in 1951 and currently the NRU reactor produces the medical-use cobalt-60, while selected CANDU reactors produce industrial-use cobalt-60, comprising 85% of the world's supply. NRU was primarily a Canadian design, and a significant improvement on NRX. Other than radioisotope production, the NRU provides irradiation services for nuclear materials and fuels testing, as well as producing neutron beams for the National Research Council's Canadian Neutron Beam Laboratory.

On May 24, 1958, the NRU suffered a major accident. A damaged uranium fuel rod caught fire and was torn in two as it was being removed from the core, due to inadequate cooling. The fire was extinguished, but not before releasing a sizeable quantity of radioactive combustion products that contaminated the interior of the reactor building and, to a lesser degree, an area of the surrounding laboratory site. Over 600 people were employed in the clean-up.

No immediate injuries resulted from AECL's two accidents, but there were over-exposures to radiation. In the case of the NRU cleanup, this resulted in at least one documented case of latent, life-changing injury, as well as allegations that radiation monitoring and protection were inadequate (meaning that additional latent injuries would have gone unrecognized or unacknowledged).

=== 1960s ===
In 1954 AECL partnered with the Hydro-Electric Power Commission of Ontario to build Canada's first nuclear power plant at Rolphton, Ontario, which is 30 kilometres (19 mi) upstream from Chalk River. On June 4, 1962, the NPD (Nuclear Power Demonstration) first reactor went critical to demonstrate the CANDU concept, generating about 20 MWe. In 1963, AECL established the Whiteshell Nuclear Research Establishment (now Whiteshell Laboratories) in Pinawa, Manitoba, where an organically moderated and cooled reactor was built. Later work on developing a SLOWPOKE reactor, thorium fuel cycle, and a proposal for safe storage of radioactive waste were carried out at this site.

AECL built a larger CANDU prototype (200 MWe) at Douglas Point on Lake Huron, first going critical on November 15, 1966. Douglas Point experienced significant problems with leakage of heavy water, which were eventually solved by much-improved valve design. Other important design refinements worked out at Douglas Point opened the way for upscaling to commercial power CANDU reactors in subsequent years.

=== 1970s ===
In 1971 the first commercial CANDU reactor, Pickering A 1, began commercial operation. By 1973 the other three reactors of the A group at Pickering were online and constituted the most powerful nuclear facility in the world at that time. Each Pickering unit produces about 600 MWe of power.

On May 18, 1974, India detonated a nuclear bomb made from plutonium manufactured by the CIRUS research reactor built by AECL in 1956, which was a commercial version of its NRX research reactor. In addition AECL built two power reactors in India based on the Douglas Point design, and many of India's other reactors are domestic variants of this design. The connection between India's nuclear weapons program and its CIRUS research reactor led to a severance of nuclear technological cooperation between Canada and India.

In 1977–1978 the Bruce A group went online and began commercial operation. Each Bruce unit produces about 800 MWe of power. In 1978, Whiteshell Labs began research into fuel waste disposal.

=== 1980s ===
Between 1983 and 1986, the Pickering B group went online and also in 1983 the single CANDU reactor at Point Lepreau began operation, as did the Gentilly 2 CANDU reactor. Between 1984 and 1987 the Bruce B group began commercial operation, and also in 1987 the CANDU design was ranked one of Canada's top-10 engineering achievements.

Douglas Point was decommissioned in May 1984.

=== Therac-25 incidents (1985-1987) ===
Between 1985 and 1987, a series of design flaws in AECL's Therac-25 medical accelerator caused massive overdoses of radiation on 6 different occasions, resulting in five deaths. In 1987 the machine was found defective by the Food and Drug Administration (FDA) and eventually recalled by AECL despite their multiple denials that the problems existed.

=== 1990s ===
Between 1990 and 1993, the 4 CANDU reactors at Darlington went online and represent the most recent reactor construction in Canada.

In 1991, AECL decided to spin off its medical isotope production business under the name Nordion International Inc. The unit was sold to MDS Health Group and now operates under the name MDS Nordion

In the same year, AECL launched the AECL Nuclear Battery, a low-pressure solid-state atomic battery that was capable of providing electricity and heat for 15 years without refueling. It belongs to the SLOWPOKE (Safe Low-Power Kritical Experiment), reactors' family, a technology developed in Canada and safely used in Jamaica for decades.

With a contract signed in 1991, AECL, in partnership with MDS Nordion, began construction of the MAPLE dedicated isotope-production facility. Constructed on-site at AECL's Chalk River Laboratories this facility would house two reactors and an isotope processing facility. Each reactor was designed to be able to produce at least 100% of the world's medical isotopes, meaning that the second reactor would be used as a back-up to ensure an uninterruptible supply. The first reactor was started but experienced malfunctions in its safety rods, and a positive nuclear power feedback coefficient was recorded. After running over the Schedule by more than 8 years and more than doubling the initial budget, AECL cancelled the project in 2008 because the design was flawed.

Unit 1 of the Cernavodă Nuclear Power Plant was commissioned on December 2, 1996. Rated at 706 MWe, it currently supplies approximately 10% of Romania's electrical needs. Unit Two achieved criticality on 6 May 2007 and was connected to the national grid on 7 August. It began operating at full capacity on 12 September 2007, also producing 706 MW.

In the late 1990s, several reactors were built by AECL in South Korea. Wolsong 2 was commissioned July 1, 1997. Wolsong 3 was commissioned on July 1, 1998. Wolsong 4 was commissioned October 1, 1999. All three reactors were rated at 715MWe Gross Output. They currently have some of the highest lifetime capacity factors of nuclear reactors.

=== 2000s ===
CKML was a 50-watt radio station owned by Atomic Energy of Canada Limited through licensee "The Security Systems Coordinator, Chalk River Laboratories" which operated at 530 kHz on the AM band in Chalk River, Ontario, Canada. The station was designed solely to broadcast emergency information in event of an accident at the laboratory. It was operational and licensed from 1998 to 2012. According to the June 2020 issue of the Canadian Radio News Facebook page, CKML is off the air.

In 2001, AECL began tests at Chalk River Labs to determine the feasibility of using surplus mixed oxide fuel (MOX) from the Russian and U.S. defence programs (which contains plutonium) as a fuel in CANDU reactors.

Currently, AECL is developing the Advanced CANDU Reactor, or "ACR". This design is meant to improve the commercial CANDU 6 design in terms of capital cost and construction schedule, while maintaining the classic design and safety characteristics of the CANDU concept.

Cernavoda Nuclear Power Plant Unit 2 began operation on May 6, 2007. Preparatory work required for the completion of Units 3 and 4 is scheduled to begin by the end of 2007.

Company president Robert Van Adel announced that he would be stepping down from the position of president and retired from the company effective November 11, 2007.

Energy Alberta Corporation announced August 27, 2007, that they had filed application for a license to build a new nuclear plant at Lac Cardinal (30 km west of the town of Peace River. The application would see an initial twin AECL Advanced CANDU Reactor (ACR) plant go online in 2017, producing 2.2 gigawatt (electric).

Point Lepreau, New Brunswick CANDU 6 plant refurbishment to begin as of April 1, 2008.

In June 2008, the Province of Ontario has announced plans to build two additional commercial reactors for electricity generation at a site next to Ontario Power Generation's Darlington Nuclear Generating Station Two companies, AREVA and Westinghouse Electric Company along with AECL submitted proposals to build the reactors. In June 2009 the province announced that only AECL's ACR-1000 submission met all the proposal requirements. The Ontario government has since suspended the acquisition process citing the cost and uncertainty surrounding the companies future ownership (discussed below).

Medical isotope production using the 1957-built NRU reactor experienced two forced outages due to safety concerns (December 2007) and a heavy water leak (May 14, 2009). The production from the NRU reactor represented a significant fraction of the worlds medical isotope supply and the disruptions caused a worldwide shortage. Due to maintenance requirements from the aging NRU reactor and the failure of the MAPLE 1 & 2 reactor projects, the long term production of medical isotopes at Chalk River became uncertain. The NRU reactor at Chalk River was shut down in 2018.

=== 2011 Divestiture CANDU Design Division ===
In the summer of 2011 SNC-Lavalin won an international bidding process for the reactor design division of the company. Prior to the acquisition, 10% of SNC Lavalin's international power workforce (400 of 4000) were engaged in the production and refurbishment of nuclear reactors. Concerns raised about the deal include a lack of commitment by SNC-Lavalin to keeping the design division intact (its size makes it more capable of providing ongoing safety support). For 2010 and 2009 combined Atomic Energy of Canada Ltd lost CA$493 million. Following divestiture of the reactor design division, AECL will consist of the current Nuclear Laboratories division, including the Chalk River laboratory (produces isotopes for medical imaging), and will continue to be a Crown Corporation on paper but will privatise the operation of its facilities.

== See also ==
- Canadian government scientific research organizations
- Canadian industrial research and development organizations
- Canadian university scientific research organizations
- Electricity sector in Canada
