= Chalk River =

Village in Ontario, Canada

- Dissolved village
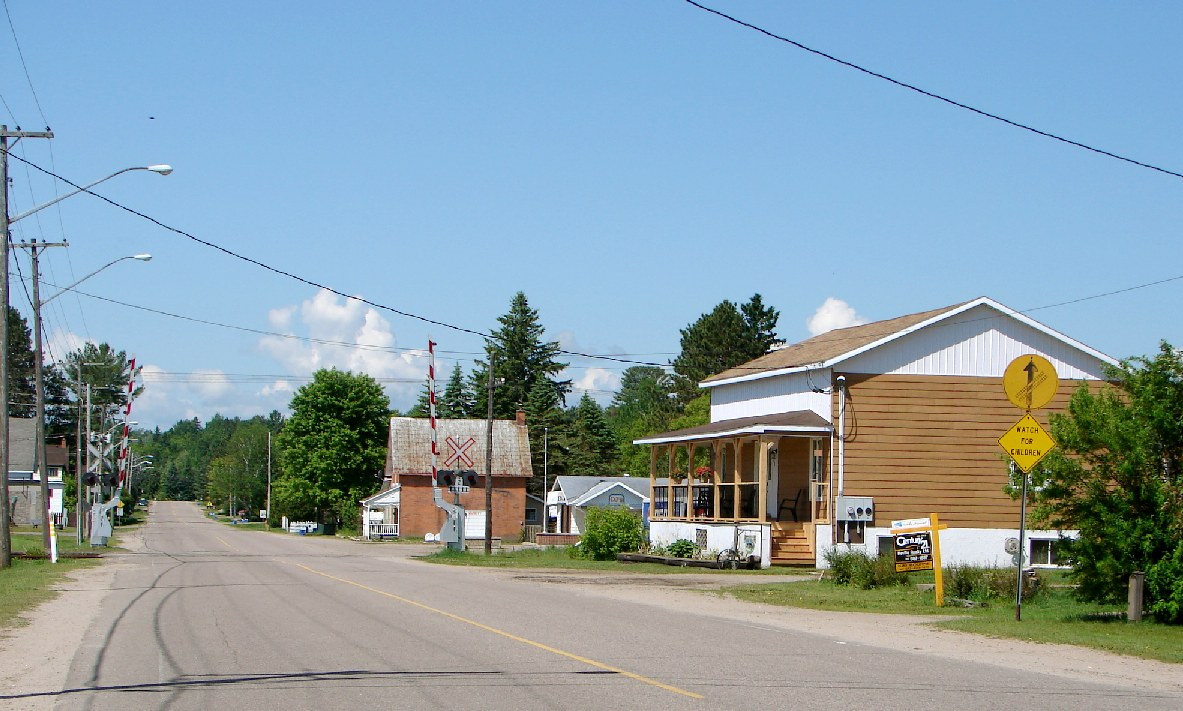
- Main Street in Chalk River

- Location of Chalk River in Ontario
- Coordinates: 46°01′N 77°27′W
- Country: Canada
- Province: Ontario
- County: Renfrew

Government
  - MP (Renfrew—Nipissing—Pembroke): Cheryl Gallant (CPC)
  - Legislative Assembly of Ontario (Renfrew—Nipissing—Pembroke): John Yakabuski Progressive Conservative

Area
  - Total: 1.83 km^{2} (0.71 sq mi)

Population (2016)
  - Total: 1,029
  - Density: 561.5/km^{2} (1,454/sq mi)
  - Change 2011-16: ▲5.8%
- Time zone: UTC-5 (EST)
  - Summer (DST): UTC-4 (EDT)

Chalk River (2016 population: 1029) is a community located within the town of Laurentian Hills in Renfrew County, Ontario, Canada. It is located in the Upper Ottawa Valley along Highway 17 (Trans-Canada Highway), 10 kilometres (6 mi) inland (west) from the Ottawa River, approximately 21 km (13 mi) northwest of Petawawa, and 182 km (113 mi) northwest of Ottawa. Chalk River was a separate municipality until January 1, 2000, when the United Townships of Rolph, Buchanan, Wylie and McKay and the Village of Chalk River were merged.

Chalk River's area is environmentally pristine with extensive forests, hills and numerous small lakes, all of which support a variety of wildlife typical to the southern edge of the Canadian Shield.

St. Anthony's Elementary School is the only educational institution in the community, instructing grades Junior Kindergarten to Grade 8. It provides Catholic education to the children in the neighbourhood, with a church next door. Students in higher grades are bussed to nearby Deep River.

The town consists mainly of detached houses with some townhouses and an apartment building. Local services include a convenience store and a gas station. The only traditional truck stop-style restaurant, the Treetop, was lost in February 2019 to a roof collapse and remains to be demolished or rebuilt. The Chalk River library, the Lions Hall, and the Legion all play an important part in the community.

Local recreational activities include hiking, four-wheeling, and biking. In the winter, snowmobile and cross country ski trails can be enjoyed. A skating rink and baseball diamond are also present.

== History ==
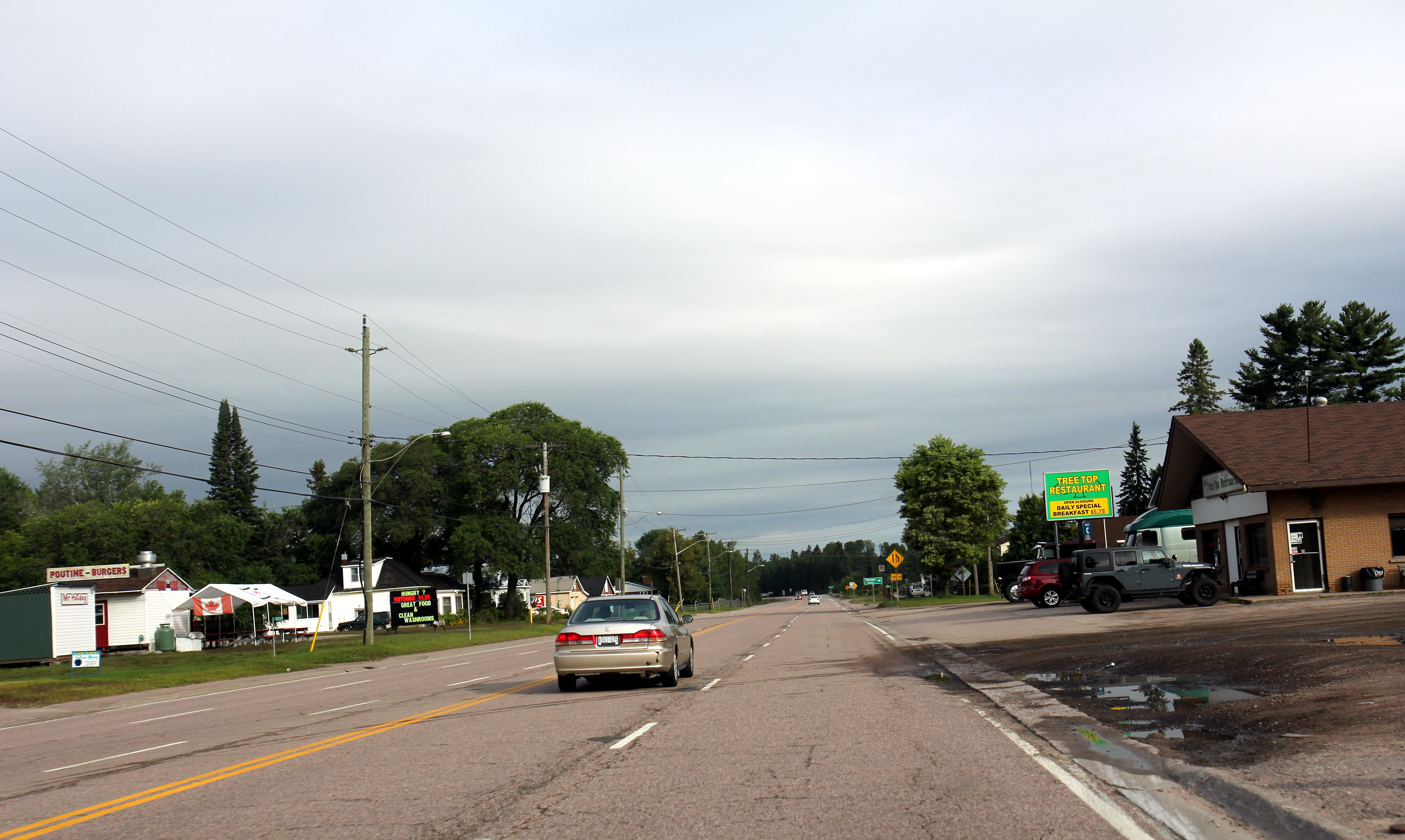
Chalk River on Ontario Highway 17

The town was first settled in the mid-19th century and named in 1875 after the Chalk River (named for the chalk loggers used to mark logs) flowing just south of the community.

Chalk River played an increasingly important role in settlement of the Upper Ottawa Valley after a Canadian Pacific Railway line was constructed through the area.

== Demographics ==
In the 2021 Census of Population conducted by Statistics Canada, Chalk River had a population of 1,025 living in 412 of its 437 total private dwellings, a change of 2.5% from its 2016 population of 1,000. With a land area of 2.31 km^{2} (0.89 sq mi), it had a population density of 443.7/km^{2} (1,149.2/sq mi) in 2021.

== Local employers ==
Employers include Bubble Technology Industries. The Canadian Forest Service maintains the Petawawa Research Forest nearby. The community borders the northern edge of CFB Petawawa.

Chalk River Laboratories, formerly Chalk River Nuclear Laboratories, was the first laboratory created by Atomic Energy of Canada Limited. It is located on the bank of the Ottawa River in the neighbouring town of Deep River. It opened in 1944 and hosted the first nuclear reactor outside of the United States to become operational, in 1945. It was the site of two nuclear accidents in the 1950s, the 1952 NRX incident and the 1958 NRU incident. Future U.S. president Jimmy Carter, then a U.S. Navy officer in Schenectady, New York, led a team of 26 men, including 13 U.S. Navy volunteers in the hazardous cleanup of the first of these.
