= Natural uranium =

92-proton element with the same mix of isotopes as found in nature, i.e. unenriched

Natural uranium (NU or U_{nat}) is uranium with the same isotopic ratio as found in nature. It contains 0.711% uranium-235, 99.284% uranium-238, and a trace of uranium-234 by weight (0.0055%). Approximately 2.2% of its radioactivity comes from uranium-235, 48.6% from uranium-238, and 49.2% from uranium-234.

Natural uranium can be used to fuel both low- and high-power nuclear reactors. Historically, graphite-moderated reactors and heavy water-moderated reactors have been fueled with natural uranium in the pure metal (U) or uranium dioxide (UO_{2}) ceramic forms. However, experimental fuelings with uranium trioxide (UO_{3}) and triuranium octaoxide (U_{3}O_{8}) have shown promise.

The 0.72% uranium-235 is not sufficient to produce a self-sustaining critical chain reaction in light water reactors or nuclear weapons; these applications must use enriched uranium. Nuclear weapons take a concentration of 90% uranium-235, and light water reactors require a concentration of roughly 3% uranium-235. Unenriched natural uranium is appropriate fuel for a heavy-water reactor, like a CANDU reactor.

On rare occasions, earlier in geologic history, when uranium-235 was more abundant, uranium ore was found to have naturally engaged in fission, forming natural nuclear fission reactors. Uranium-235 decays at a faster rate (half-life of 700 million years) compared to uranium-238, which decays extremely slowly (half-life of 4.5 billion years). Therefore, a billion years ago, there was more than double the uranium-235 compared to now.

During the Manhattan Project, the name Tuballoy was used to refer to natural uranium in the refined condition; this term is still in occasional use. Uranium was also codenamed "X-Metal" during World War II. Similarly, enriched uranium was referred to as Oralloy (Oak Ridge alloy), and depleted uranium was referred to as Depletalloy (depleted alloy).

== See also ==
- List of uranium mines
- Nuclear engineering
- Nuclear fuel cycle
- Nuclear physics
- Nuclear chemistry
