= White Owl Conservation Awards =

Canadian environmental prizes and grants (1968–1976)

- Awarded for: greatest contribution to the preservation of the Canadian environment
- Sponsored by: General Cigar Co. (1968–71); Imperial Tobacco (1972–76)
- Country: Canada
- Presented by: government minister or senator
- Rewards: varied by year and recipient
- First award: 1968
- Final award: 1976

The White Owl Conservation Awards were established in 1968. Initially, a single award was given annually to the person or group (chosen from those nominated) that was considered to have made the greatest contribution to the preservation of Canada's natural environment. The award could be shared by two persons or groups. Later, separate prizes were given annually for individuals and groups. A system of grants for worthy environmental projects was introduced in 1970.

The awards and grants were discontinued at the end of 1976 due to controversy over their sponsor. The original sponsor of the program was the General Cigar Company of Montréal, Quebec (see Note (Note: The official names in English of the cities of Montréal and Québec include the accented "é ". This rule applies to all diacritics (accents and other marks) in the names of all inhabited places in Canada, e.g., City of Saint-Jérôme, Village of Saint-Noël, Municipality of Saint-François-de-l'Île-d'Orléans. The official name in English of the Province of Quebec does not include the accent.) for use of accented "é "), maker of the White Owl brand of cigars. By 1972, sponsorship was assumed by Imperial Tobacco, of which General Cigar was a subsidiary.

== Establishment and sponsorship ==
"Stirring the polluted mud"

"An aroused public is the only thing that will force governments at all levels to take adequate steps to combat air and water pollution, prevent desecration of forests and stem the demise of wildlife, says Robert Alexander.

Canadian business has come under attack from time to time as ' profit-seeking commercial interests ' mainly responsible for the ' rape of the environment '. Mr. Alexander feels, though, that the problem is broader than that. ' Society in general has to share some of the blame, because in its haste to acquire easier living without adequate planning, it is often forgotten that a large price is being paid for it, bigger even than the price tags on new automobiles '. ...

Mr. Alexander says that, in the coming century, technology will make for more and more leisure time, but ' we will have nowhere to go in pursuit of happiness '. Industrial effluent has poisoned the rivers, the air will be toxic with exhaust fumes, the countryside will have vanished and cities will be paralyzed by congestion. ' But it was in recognition of those who are striving to do something about the problem that our [White Owl Conservation] award was initiated.'"

— Robert Wilson (1970), Montreal Star, Jan 6, 1970, p. 19.
"Anti-pollution action growing in business"

... " Bob Alexander is as much a keen conservationist as he is a businessman, and tries to incorporate the two interests. True, he has often been asked how a man concerned about wildlife and clean air can manufacture ' these smelly cigars ' and no, he doesn't have an answer. ' What would you say? ' he asked with a shrug. ' I guess all I can say is that the decision to smoke is a personal one but having to breathe polluted air is not.'"

— Carol Pascoe, Canadian Press (1971), The Gazette (Montréal), May 24, 1971, p. 7.

The annual White Owl Conservation Awards were established in 1968 by Robert B. Alexander, (Note: R.B. Alexander was born in 1915 in Moose Jaw, Saskatchewan.) an ardent conservationist and the marketing Vice-President (April 1969, President) of the General Cigar Company Ltd. (Note: The General Cigar Company Limited at Montréal was incorporated federally on April 10, 1920. In 1921, the principal shareholder in General Cigar offered a controlling interest in the company to the Imperial Tobacco Company of Canada. This cash purchase was approved by Imperial's shareholders on July 7, and was completed by the September 30 end of its fiscal year. General Cigar remained a direct subsidiary through 1968. In January 1969, it was placed under Imperial Tobacco Products Ltd. in one of the three new operating divisions of a reorganized Imperial Tobacco Company of Canada. To avoid confusion, the latter company was renamed Imasco Limited (from Imperial Associated Companies) in September 1970.) The company used part of its advertising budget to sponsor the awards.

In November 1967, General Cigar had introduced new packaging and collectible insert cards for the four varieties of its White Owl brand of cigars. The cards were illustrated by J. Fenwick Lansdowne, an internationally noted painter of Canadian birds, with descriptive texts added by naturalist John Livingstone. During their conversations on environmental matters, Alexander, Lansdowne, and Livingstone had noted "the fact that Canada had no way of recognizing its outstanding conservationists", which led to the creation of the White Owl awards in 1968.

Robert Alexander left General Cigar as of May 1, 1971, to take up the position of manager of a tobacco wholesaler in Victoria, British Columbia. He was replaced as President of General Cigar by one of its vice-presidents, Edmond Ricard, who became President of Imperial Tobacco Products Ltd. as of March 1, 1972. Ricard held the Imperial Tobacco position in addition to the presidencies of its subsidiaries, General Cigar Co. and Imperial Leaf Tobacco Co.

By 1972, sponsorship of the White Owl Conservation Awards was transferred from General Cigar Company (Note: During 1973–1975, the administration, operations, and equipment of General Cigar were transferred in stages into the facilities of Imperial Tobacco Products Limited. A new cigar company, General Cigar Company (1974) Limited, was incorporated October 7, 1974, at the new location. The federal charter of incorporation for the original General Cigar Company was surrendered in 1976, and cancelled March 1977. The "(1974)" in the name of the second cigar company was deleted in July 1979.) to its parent company, Imperial Tobacco Products Limited, which was renamed Imperial Tobacco Limited in November 1974. This incarnation of Imperial Tobacco was an operating division of Imasco Limited.

== Awards and grants ==
=== Achievement awards ===
The first White Owl Conservation Award (1968) was a single honour comprising a trophy and a $5000 prize. It was presented to the individual or organization considered by an independent panel of judges (the Awards Committee) to have "contributed the most" to conservation in Canada. Nominations for the first award opened in March 1968, and it was presented the following December. In the first year, candidates for consideration could be proposed only by members of Outdoor Writers of Canada, (Note: "Outdoor Writers of Canada" was the name in English of the organization since its formation in March 1957 and incorporation in November 1962. However, newspapers also referred to the group as "Canadian Outdoor Writers Association" and "Outdoor Writers Association of Canada".) who nominated fourteen organizations and one individual. Starting in 1969, nominations could be made by any Canadian.

The winner in 1970 was the nominee considered by the Awards Committee to have contributed the most to anti-pollution work and the preservation of the Canadian environment. The amount of the prize was doubled in 1971 to $10000. In addition, the specific reference in the criteria to anti-pollution work was dropped, and the phrase "outstanding contribution" came into use near the end of that year alongside the phrase "contributed the most".

Separate awards for groups and individuals were introduced in 1972, with respective prizes of $10000 and $2000. In 1975, the prize for the individual award was increased to $3000.

=== Television commercial competition ===
In each of 1971 and 1972, the Awards Committee held a competition among post-secondary educational institutions for the production of a television commercial that promoted public participation in the preservation of the environment. All entries became the property of the Committee. The prizes were $1000 for first place, $300 for second place, and $100 each for two honourable mentions.

A § Summary by year of the specifics of the awards and grants and a separate list by year of the § Recipients of awards are given below.

=== Grants ===
In late April 1970, the White Owl Conservation Awards Committee announced the availability of grants of up to $2500 for conservation and anti-pollution projects, with "immediate need" being a key criterion. Initially, four grants were made each year in 1970, 1971, and 1972. In 1971, the range for the grants was set as $1000 to $2500, with a total allotment of $8000, the latter being an increase from 1970.

Beginning in 1973, the number of annual grants increased. Starting January 1974, the intention was to issue grants "on a near-monthly basis", with amounts under $1000 available. Starting February 1975, the Awards Committee could officially give multiple grants to a single group, and a special category of "mini-grants" of up to $500 was introduced for "groups getting started, or for useful, small-scale projects". The sum of $35000 was allotted for grants in each of 1975 and 1976.

A list by year of the § Recipients of grants is given below.

=== Name change ===
In March 1976, the name of the White Owl Conservation Awards (and Program) was changed to the Imperial Tobacco Environmental Awards (and Program). Imperial Tobacco gave a number of reasons for the change:

- To better reflect the company's involvement in the program.
- To better reflect the wide range of activities for which grants could be given.
- To disassociate the awards and grants from the marketing of the White Owl brand of cigars.
- To demonstrate Imperial Tobacco's "shared concern for the quality of the Canadian environment".

=== Summary of awards and grants ===
White Owl Conservation Awards and Grants, 1968-1976
Year	Annual Prize(s)			Grants available for Projects	Ref.
Year	Person or Group		TV Commercial	Grants available for Projects	Ref.
1968	$5000		—	—	
1969	$5000		—	—	
1970	$5000		—	Up to $2500 each.	
1971	$10000		$1000/$300/$100	From $1000 to $2500 each.	
	Group	Person			
1972	$10000	$2000	$1000/$300/$100	From $1000 to $2500 each.	
1973	$10000	$2000	—	From $1000 to $2500 each.	
1974	$10000	$2000	—	Up to $2500 each.	
1975	$10000	$3000	—	Up to $2500 each.	
1976	$10 000	$3000	—	Up to $2500 each.	

== Recipients of awards ==
Recipients of the White Owl Conservation Award(s), 1968–1975
Year	Recipient(s) and Achievement(s)	Trophy & Prize	Presenter
1968	Albion Hills Conservation School, in the Township of Albion (1974, Town of Caledon): – For "its educational programs for a wide variety of youth and student groups (Note: School students, 4-H clubs, Junior Farmers, Junior Conservationists, Girl Guides, etc.) in many aspects of conservation and the outdoor environment. (Note: "Soil and forest conservation, recreation, agriculture, flood control, weather, fish and wildlife.") ... Its seven day a week programs are so successful that they are booked one year in advance." The judges hoped that the selection of the Albion Hills School would "encourage the establishment of more such facilities" for the betterment of children and adults everywhere in Canada.	$5000	Jean Chrétien (Note: Federal Minister of Indian Affairs and Northern Development)
1969	John R. Heron, (Note: In John R. Heron's 1969 history of the Royal Bank of Canada, the Bank wrote: "Author John R. Heron, 72, has for 26 years – more than a quarter of the century he describes – been the writer, editor, and creative spirit behind the much-acclaimed Royal Bank Monthly Letter. A former newspaperman and associate editor of the Toronto Star Weekly, Mr. Heron thinks of himself as neither banker nor economist, but as teacher. In this role, his thoughtful, classical essays on an astonishing array of topics have stimulated, amused, informed, and inspired hundreds of thousands of readers not only in Canada but around the globe."; In 1993, historian Duncan McDowall wrote: "Heron produced the Monthly Letter with elegant simplicity. The letter became a four-page essay, unsigned, unillustrated, and devoid of advertising. His themes were simple: 'The Public Library,' 'Growing Old Successfully,' or 'Conservation of Soil.' The prose was beautifully crafted and unpretentious."; John Rutherford Heron retired from the Royal Bank Monthly Letter (as it was commonly known) after its December 1975 issue just before his 79th birthday. The history and impact of the publication are discussed in a 2020 book by Sandra L. Braun.) author, Royal Bank of Canada Monthly Letter : (Note: Searchable online archive of the Monthly Letter : "RBC Letter Collection (1943–2008)", Royal Bank of Canada, www.rbc.com (Accessed Jan 27, 2026.)) – For using the publication since 1946 to promote conservation to its 700000 readers worldwide (in 1969) and for publishing two booklets on the conservation of flora and fauna. B.C. Wildlife Federation: – For creating "public awareness of the need to accommodate outdoor recreational values" and inserting "a conservation viewpoint into the decision making process" regarding the development and management of the province's natural resources.	$5000 shared	Alan Macnaughton (Note: Senator for Saurel Division, Quebec, founder (1967) and Chair of World Wildlife Fund Canada.)
1970	Pollution Probe (founded 1969 at the University of Toronto): – For raising public awareness of the problem of phosphates in detergents and for being a key player in getting Ontario to ban the insecticide DDT.	$5000	Jean Chrétien
1971	Tony Le Sauteur, chemist, conservationist, and Director of Fédération québécoise de la faune (Quebec Wildlife Federation): – For numerous contributions, including the development of a widely used method of stocking lakes with fish, the establishment of 50 local lake associations to prevent pollution, and his work to restore the shoreline and islands of the St. Lawrence River as public parklands. Le Sauteur was a very active and vocal opponent of water pollution, notably industrial pollution in the Ottawa River and untreated sewage from the City of Montréal. He was considered to be the pre-eminent water pollution expert in Montréal.	$10000	Victor Goldbloom (Note: Quebec Minister of State responsible for the environment)
1971	Competition among post-secondary educational institutions for the production of a television commercial that promoted public participation in environmental preservation: 1st Place – Richard Ouzilleau and Gérard Roy of Cégep de La Pocatière – $1000; 2nd Place – McGill University, Educational Media Centre, Montréal – $300; Hon. Men. – Carleton University, Instructional Aids Dept. at Ottawa, Ontario; and Robert Pollard of McGill University – $100 each		Victor Goldbloom
1972	Canadian Wildlife Federation: – For its education program, its submissions to the government on proposed environmental legislation, its contribution to the creation of the Canadian Arctic Resources Commission, and its intervention in legal actions in U.S. courts to block the construction of an oil pipeline in Alaska and the consequent transportation by ocean tankers.	Group $10000	Jean Chrétien
1972	Dr. Fred Knelman of Sir George Williams University: – For raising public awareness of key environmental issues and representing Canada at international environmental meetings.	Person $2000	Jean Chrétien
1972	Competition among post-secondary educational institutions for the production of a television commercial that promoted public participation in environmental preservation: 1st Place – University of Saskatchewan, Audio-Visual Services (which included Ted Barris) at Saskatoon – $1000; 2nd Place – University of Alberta at Edmonton – $300; Hon. Men. – University of Winnipeg, Media Service; and Douglas College, Audio-Visual Services at New Westminster, BC – $100 each		Jean Chrétien
1973	Students' Park Fund: – For raising money to purchase parkland in the Hamilton, Ontario, area of the Niagara Escarpment for the creation of a nature park by the local conservation authority in lieu of commercial development. National and Provincial Parks Association: – For its successful opposition to the residential and commercial development of the Lake Louise area in the Alberta Rockies.	Group $10000 shared	Maurice Lamontagne (Note: Senator for Inkerman Division, Quebec)
1973	Dr. Donald Chant, Chair of Zoology Department at the University of Toronto, outspoken environmentalist, a co-founder of Pollution Probe (1969), the Canadian Environmental Law Research Foundation (1970), and the Canadian Arctic Resources Committee (1971): – For crystallizing public opinion on the need for genuine action on environmental problems.	Person $2000	Maurice Lamontagne
1974	Canadian Environmental Law Research Foundation: – For its efforts to enforce environmental laws through the courts and for its book Environment on Trial: A Citizen's Guide to Ontario Environmental Law.	Group $10000	Jeanne Sauvé (Note: Federal Minister of the Environment)
1974	Jack O'Dette: – For "an estimated 22,000 hours of conservation work" as a co-founder of the Canadian Wildlife Federation and a longtime officer of the Ontario Federation of Anglers and Hunters.	Person $2000	Jeanne Sauvé
1975	Canadian Arctic Resources Committee, comprising scientists, sociologists, lawyers, engineers, business people, and indigenous people: – For its work to ensure that development projects in the Arctic are fully studied before being implemented.	Group $10000	George Albert Kerr (Note: Ontario Minister of the Environment)
1975	Anthony Barrett, a co-founder of Pollution Probe (1969) and an environmental consultant: – For his efforts to increase public awareness of environmentally destructive activities in Canada.	Person $3000	George Albert Kerr
Recipients of the Imperial Tobacco Environment Awards, 1976
Year	Recipient(s) and Achievement(s)		Trophy & Prize
1976	Energy Probe: – For its participation in the development of a Canadian energy policy that maximizes the use of renewable sources.		Group $10000
1976	Gary Gallon, Director, Canadian Scientific Pollution and Environmental Control Society, Vancouver: – For his strong advocacy for the prevention and elimination of petroleum pollution in marine environments. Douglas Pimlott, Professor of Forestry and Zoology, University of Toronto, and member, Canadian Arctic Resources Committee: – For his active and vocal opposition to the drilling for oil and gas in Canada's Arctic waters.		Person $3000 shared

== Recipients of grants ==
Grants by the White Owl Conservation Award(s) Committee for projects, 1970–1976
Year	Recipient and Purpose(s)	Amount
1970	Pollution Probe - Toronto: – To finance its Summer Project '70 in which a group of university students studied water pollution in Ontario's resort areas and held discussion groups with seasonal residents regarding means of reducing such pollution.	$2000
1970	Society for Pollution and Environmental Control (SPEC) of Vancouver, British Columbia: – For its anti-pollution projects, including an "Ecology Caravan" travelling around BC to publicize the need for immediate action on pollution, equipment for a laboratory to test air and water, and sound metering equipment.	$2500
1970	Society to Overcome Pollution (STOP) of Montréal, Quebec: – To defray its office expenses.	$1000
1970	Conseil québécois de l'environnement (Quebec Council on the Environment) (Note: The initial purpose of the newly formed Conseil québécois de l'environnement was to co-ordinate conservation information, publicity, and activities among Quebec businesses, industries, and citizen-led conservation organizations. However, due to the dominance of corporations on the Council, it was immediately boycotted by the principal conservation groups in the province and evolved into an advisory committee of scientists and engineers.) : – To publish an information bulletin.	$1000
1970	The White Owl Committee sponsored and hosted an Anti-Pollution Conference (Note: Robert Alexander, President of General Cigar Co. and founder of the White Owl Conservation Awards, was personally involved in the promotion of the Anti-Pollution Conference.) in the Laurentians at Lac-Écho, north of Saint-Jérôme, Quebec, July 31 and August 1–2, for anti-pollution organizations from across Canada. The conference resulted in the adoption of The Canadian Association on Human Environment (incorporated federally April 1970) (Note: The Canadian Association on Human Environment surrendered its charter in 1974 and was dissolved September 1975.) as a national co-ordinating office for the groups.	
1971	Algonquin Wildlands League: – To support its campaign against further logging in Quetico Provincial Park.	$1300
1971	Douglas Pimlott, Professor of Forestry and Zoology, University of Toronto, ardent promoter of conservation and active member of several conservation organizations: – To finance "a cross-Canada study of environmental quality".	$2500
1971	Ojibwe youth of the Rat Portage Reserve near Kenora, Ontario: – To establish a wild rice paddy in a ravine near Lake of the Woods.	$1500
1971	Canadian Arctic Resources Committee, formed June 1971: – In support of its efforts to assess research done by government, universities, and industry on northern development.	$2500
1972	National and Provincial Parks Association of Canada, Ottawa Branch: – To finance the printing of its booklet Gatineau Park: A Proposal for its Conservation and Use in which the group argued for the preservation of the park in its current semi-wilderness state.	$2000
1972	R. Murray Schafer, Professor of Communication Studies at Simon Fraser University: – To publish a new edition of his book The Book of Noise, which described the dangers of noise pollution.	$2125
1972	Canadian Environmental Law Research Foundation: – To set up a law advisory office at Sudbury, Ontario, to assist the public in legal fights against pollution.	$2500
1972	Bruce Litteljohn, director of the Algonquin Wildlands League, former Quetico Provincial Park ranger, and opponent of logging and mining in provincial parks: – To enable him "to complete an environmental survey of the Canadian shore of Lake Superior" with the intention of publishing a photographically illustrated book of the area.	$2500
The following should not be treated as complete since the entries are derived primarily from reports in print media. Two of the items (one in 1973, one in 1974) were found only in archival records.
1973	Comité pour la défense de la Baie James (James Bay Defence Committee) of Montréal: – To enable it to hold public hearings on the ecological, social, and economic aspects of a vast hydroelectric project in the James Bay region.	$2500
1973	B.C. Wildlife Federation: – For the publication of a booklet promoting the establishment of provincially protected "wild rivers", which were "to be preserved in their natural, free-flowing state."	$1850
1973	Ecology Action Centre of Halifax, Nova Scotia: – For its representations to governments and public information campaigns regarding recycling, public transit, large-scale energy projects (off-shore oil drilling, oil refinery on the Strait of Canso, proposed nuclear reactor), and the provincial Environmental Protection Act.	$2500
1973	Calgary Boy Scouts: – For the production and distribution to other scout groups of a booklet promoting a revised form of their traditional camping in which nature is no longer viewed as something to be conquered.	$2262
1973	Centre for Environmental Law (Le Centre d'assistance juridique pour l'environnement) of the Society to Overcome Pollution (STOP) of Montréal: – To translate two of its books into French, Environment and the Law: The Citizen's Role (as L'Environnement et la Loi) and Environment Index: Jurisprudence, Legislation, and Doctrine (as Index juridique sur l'environnement).	$2500
1974	Le Centre de l'éducation sur l'environnement (Centre for Environmental Education) established by members of the Society to Overcome Pollution (STOP) of Montréal: – To help the Centre complete the current year of teacher-training in environmental studies.	$2500
1974	Alberta Wilderness Association of Calgary, Alberta: – To supply high schools in the province with copies of its studies on the preservation and recreational use of wildlands in the Alberta Rockies.	$2500
1974	Centre écologique de Port-au-Saumon (Port-au-Saumon Ecological Centre) near the village of Saint-Fidèle-de-Mont-Murray, Quebec: – To subsidize the free admission for visitors to guided tours of the nature trails, which included marine fauna and flora at low tide.	$700
1974	Nova Scotia Teachers College of Truro: – To assist its development of a wilderness training centre comprising 600 acres of woods, fields, streams, and ponds on the bank of the Salmon River.	?
1974	Natural Recovery Systems of Moncton, New Brunswick: – To promote its recycling system among the residents of the city. The company operated a facility where recyclable glass containers and paper products were sorted and packed following their retrieval from a number of collection depots. In 1974, it had a proposal before the city council for curbside collection.	$2500
1974	Panels 9 and 10 of the Canadian Committee for the International Biological Programme, at Edmonton, Alberta: – To promote the Committee's proposal to create protected ecological reserves in Canada's Arctic (August, $1500), and for the reprinting of its information booklet Arctic Ecological Reserves (September, $1500).	$3000
1974	James Kevin O'Neil, graduate student at Macdonald College, Montréal: – In support of his research into the "activity of small mammals in a woodland community."	$200
1974	Citizens United to Restore our Environment (CURE) of Brockville, Ontario: – To support their symposium for area municipalities and residents to discuss the problems of solid waste disposal and the implementation of recycling.	$2000
1974	Raptor Research Centre at Macdonald College, Montréal: – In support of its program to revive birds of prey in areas from which they have been driven out by humans.	$2500
1975	Project Jonah Canada (formed December 1972 by Farley Mowat): – For its work in preventing the killing of whales and other cetaceans. (January 1975 for 1974 program.)	$2500
1975	Dr. Michel Famelart and students of Université de Montréal : – For a feasibility study to extend protected parkland status to all of the isolated mountains of the Monteregian Hills from the City of Montréal towards the City of Sherbrooke. This status would allow for the future establishment of a series of recreational trails on and between the mountains. (January 1975 for 1974 program.)	$2500
1975	Katherine (Kay) and Larry McKeever in the Vineland community of Lincoln, Ontario: – For their care and rehabilitation of injured birds of prey, especially owls.	$2500
1975	Yukon Conservation Society: – For the publication of its illustrated newsletter about Yukon wildlife and related matters.	$500
1975	Pollution Probe - Ottawa: – To support their protest against recent Ontario legislation that did not impose a ban on all non-returnable soft-drink containers. An information caravan toured twelve centres in the central and eastern parts of the province, and public information campaigns were conducted elsewhere with the assistance of local groups.	$2500
1975	Kindness Club of Fredericton, New Brunswick: – To publish in French the club's Golden Rules of Conservation. The focus of the group was the education of children in the humane treatment of animals.	$500
1975	British Columbia Environmental Law Centre: – For its efforts to educate the public on their environmental rights, to advise people of the legal remedies available, and to reform environmental law.	$2500
1975	Comité pour la défense de la Baie James (James Bay Defence Committee) of Montréal: – To enable it to research the socio-ecological effects of a proposed uranium enrichment plant in the James Bay region and to publish the results for the information of the general public.	$2500
1975	John Devlin of Halifax, Nova Scotia: – To permit him to research and confirm the historical rights of the City's inhabitants to access the ocean via certain designated plots of land.	$2300
1975	Gordon Edwards, editor (since 1970) of the ecology magazine Survival (house organ of the Survival movement) and co-founder (1975) of the Canadian Coalition for Nuclear Responsibility: – For the production and free extended distribution of special issues of Survival concerning nuclear energy.	?
1975	Saskatoon Environmental Society: – For the publishing of its Environment Probe magazine to promote public awareness of, and action on, environmental issues.	$2000
1975	Natural Recovery Systems of Moncton, New Brunswick: – To assist its information campaign regarding its new curbside collection program for recycling glass containers in the adjacent Town of Riverview so as to increase household participation. The company had distributed a dedicated plastic pail (called a "Glass Gobbler") to each home in the community. They hoped to extend the program to Moncton itself.	$2500
1975	Chinook Trail Association of Calgary, Alberta: – "To build stiles and footbridges for a new hiking trail ... from the Bearspaw Reservoir to Cochrane."	$400
1975	Canadian Nature Federation of Ottawa, Ontario: – To defray the costs of publishing a directory of local, provincial, national, and international environmental organizations.	$2500
1976	Pollution Probe - Toronto: – In support of a campaign to encourage businesses to use environmentally friendly packaging ($2500). – for a campaign to increase public interest in renewable sources of energy ($2500).	$5000
1976	Tetra Media Productions (independent filmmakers and members of the Toronto Filmmakers' Co-op, which provided the post-production facilities and a contact address): – For their short film A Matter of Choice: Nuclear Energy Ontario, which examined the negative environmental effects of the nuclear energy industry. (Director - Allan Goldstein, Producer - Jason Paikowsky)	$2500
1976	Alberta Wilderness Association (Calgary) and National and Provincial Parks Association (Edmonton Chapter): – To publish a study entitled The Western Swan Hills: Alberta’s Forgotten Wilderness for free distribution to Alberta and federal legislators, high-school libraries, and certain high-ranking provincial officials.	$1250
1976	Les Forestiers (The Foresters), a group of young naturalists at Rivière-à-Pierre in Portneuf County: – To improve the nature trails around a local lake by constructing walkways and to encourage public use via a visitor's guide and an outdoor theatre.	$400
Grants by the Imperial Tobacco Environment Program for projects, 1976
Year	Recipient and Purpose(s)	Amount
1976	Groupe d'étude de l'autoroute 73 (Highway 73 Study Group): – To publish an illustrated pamphlet regarding the environmental damage being done during the construction of the highway through the municipality of Notre-Dame-des-Laurentides, immediately north of Québec City.	$500
1976	Pollution Probe - Ottawa: – To help fund the Community Museum of Energy Conservation at the National Museum of Science and Technology. The project featured means of reducing energy consumption as well as the use of heat pumps and renewable sources, such as solar, wind, greenhouses, and heat pumps.	$2500
1976	Canadian Environmental Law Association of Toronto: – To develop a draft by-law for municipalities for the protection of trees, to produce a promotional information pamphlet on the matter, and to support other actions for the preservation of urban green-spaces.	$2500
1976	Group to Arrest Dryden-Minamata Disease, comprising residents of the native communities on the lower English and Wabigoon rivers in Northwestern Ontario: – To sponsor a cross-Canada information tour on the effects of mercury pollution and poisoning.	$2500
1976	Comité des Citoyens du Quartier Saint-Sauveur (Saint-Sauveur Neighbourhood Citizens' Committee) of Québec City: – To permit them to continue their efforts to reduce local noise and air pollution by closing a transit bus garage in the disadvantaged community of the Lower Town of the City.	$2500
1976	Victoria Community Video Services Society: – To produce a video highlighting the problems associated with the waterways traversing the City of Victoria, British Columbia, to educate the public and enable their intervention to avoid such problems in future planning.	$2500

== Awards Committee members ==
Committee independence causes
embarrassment to Imasco Ltd.

" Imasco Ltd. [parent company of Imperial Tobacco] of Montreal found itself in the uncomfortable position in 1974 of favoring the James Bay power project while supplying funds to its opponents. ...

Its James Bay dilemma came about through its financial support of the White Owl Conservation Awards program. The awards are administered by an independent committee, which on two occasions gave money money to opponents of the James Bay development, including the James Bay Inuit Association. The brief goes on to quote Imasco vice-president of public relations, Norman Dann:

' I got two phone calls from guys who are friends of mine, saying what the hell are giving money to them for? Well, I said, I grant you it's a bit embarrassing, but the fact is that we support the James Bay project and we also support people in their right to protest against it.'

Mr. Dann said that if Imasco itself had been making the decision, ' maybe we wouldn't have ... the thing is we gave the committee autonomy and they used it.'"

— Edward Clifford, "Imasco contends diversification has produced public benefits", The Globe and Mail (Toronto), Nov 8, 1975, page B2 (online p. 18).

The White Owl Conservation Awards Committee, which decided upon the award winners and grant recipients, consisted of prominent Canadians, many of whom were associated with the environmental movement. In 1968, the committee comprised only three members, all of whom were members of the Outdoor Writers of Canada (OWC). In subsequent years, the committee membership increased in number and encompassed a greater range of individuals. The committee was independent of the sponsors of the program, and its membership varied from year to year.

The members of the Awards Committee for selected years are given below:

1968

- Gustave Bedard, Information Director, Quebec Department of Tourism, Fish and Game, and Director OWC.
- Arthur ("Kit") Kitney, outdoors editor, Winnipeg Tribune newspaper, and former president OWC.
- Barry Penhale, publisher, Canadian Outdoorsman magazine, and Vice-President OWC.

1970

- Gordon Aiken, Member of Parliament, shadow cabinet Critic for Energy, Mines, and Resources.
- Dr. Donald Chant, Chair, Department of Zoology, University of Toronto.
- Jean Chrétien, Minister of Indian Affairs and Northern Development.
- Dr. Paul Gérin-Lajoie, former Quebec Minister of Education, Vice-Chair of Prices and Incomes Commission.
- Judy LaMarsh, lawyer, former cigarette smoker, former Minister of National Health and Welfare (1963–1965), active promoter during her ministry of the anti-smoking movement in Canada including
– prominent personal advocacy,
– government sponsorship of a major campaign to divert youth from smoking, and
– support for a ban on television advertising of cigarettes.
She was described in 1964 as "Canada's most celebrated non-smoker ".
- Farley Mowat, author and anti-whaling activist.
- Eric Nicol, humour columnist, The Province (Vancouver) newspaper.
- Robert Shaw, Vice-President, McGill University, subsequently appointed federal Deputy Minister of Fisheries and Forestry (March 1, 1971) then Canada's first Deputy Minister of the Environment (June 11, 1971) in the newly created federal Department of the Environment with Jack Davis as its Minister.
- Charles Templeton, radio and television broadcaster.

1973

- Hon. Glen M. Bagnell, Minister of the Environment, Halifax, Nova Scotia.
- Peter Calamai, columnist, Southam News Services, Ottawa, Ontario.
- Nellie J. Cournoyea, CBC Station Manager, Inuvik, Northwest Territories.
- Christian de Laet, Secretary-General of the Canadian Council of Resource and Environment Ministers, Montréal, Quebec.
- Roderick Hunter, Vice-President, James Richardson & Sons, Limited, Winnipeg, Manitoba.
- Dr. Adrian Jones, pediatrician, Edmonton, Alberta.
- Gisèle Lamoureux, ecologist, Université Laval, Québec City, Quebec.
- Louis LaPierre, Professor, Biology Department, Université de Moncton, Moncton, New Brunswick.
- Peter Middleton, Executive Director, Pollution Probe at the University of Toronto, Toronto, Ontario.
- Edward P. O'Neal, Vice-President of the United Paperworkers' International Union (formerly of the International Brotherhood of Pulp, Sulphite, and Paper Mill Workers), Vancouver, British Columbia.
- Fernand Seguin, biochemist, filmmaker, radio and television broadcaster, and prominent communicator in French of science topics to the general public, Saint-Charles-sur-Richelieu, Quebec.

1975

- Janet Foster and John Foster, nature photographers, co-hosts of To the Wild Country on CBC Television.
- Robert Franson, Associate Professor, environmental law, University of British Columbia.
- Louis Lemieux, Director, National Museum of Natural Sciences, Ottawa, Ontario.
- Norman Pascoe, assistant city-editor (former environment editor), Montreal Star.
- Bryan Pearson, member of Northwest Territorial Council, Frobisher Bay.
- Dr. Stuart Peters, of St. John's, Newfoundland, natural resources specialist and official of Shaheen Natural Resources Company Inc., whose subsidiary, Newfoundland Refining Company Ltd., built and operated the Come By Chance oil refinery. Peters was Chair of North Power Company (another Shaheen subsidiary), which was formed in 1973 to assist the government in attracting new industrial users for the electricity from the proposed Lower Churchill hydroelectric project. He had previously served as Newfoundland Deputy Minister of Resources, special adviser to the Canadian International Development Agency, and chief executive assistant to the provincial premier.
- Alan Ruffman, marine geophysicist, Halifax, Nova Scotia.
- Dixon Thompson, Faculty of Environmental Design, University of Calgary.
- Dr. Jennifer Shay, Director, Delta Marsh Field Station, University of Manitoba.
- Diana Wright, Editor, Probe magazine (June 1975, Environment Probe), Saskatoon Environmental Society, Saskatchewan.

== Termination of program ==
"White Owl withdraws from
environmental program"

" Having found out it was as welcome as a skunk at a garden party, ants at a picnic or, say, a White Owl cigar smoker at a meeting of SPEC, Imperial Tobacco Ltd. is saying farewell to the environmental movement. ...

Imperial began its environmental awards program in 1968 with annual ' White Owl Conservation Awards ' of $5,000 each. ... This year the name was changed to Imperial Tobacco Environmental Program.

' It is not really a contradiction in terms. The amount of pollution generated by tobacco products is ridiculously small,' [Michel ] Descoteaux [of Imperial Tobacco] said. 'And Imperial has always been very pollution conscious, insisting that all of its industrial operations are careful of the environment.' ...

A letter explaining its withdrawal from the program says:

' Imperial Tobacco has determined that its involvement in an environmental program sometimes lends to interpretations of its motives which tend to make it a somewhat unpleasant if not altogether counterproductive association.'

The dropping of the name White Owl from the program didn't seem to help.

' The recent change of name has precipitated some reactions which indicate that our continued sponsorship is fraught with the constant possibility of misunderstanding and embarrassment for all concerned.'

Gallon [1976 individual award co-winner] said he is sorry to see the awards program cancelled. ... ' Smoking is as bad a pollutant or contaminant around,' said Gallon, ' but we'll take money from any company around.'

Gallon said he doesn't smoke and smoking is not allowed at SPEC meetings. SPEC [a 1970 grant recipient] actively supports the anti-smoking programs of the Canadian Cancer Society and other organizations.'"

— Douglas Sagi, Vancouver Sun, Dec 11, 1976, p. 51.

"La compagnie Imperial Tobacco s'est sans doute rendu compte du ridicule dans lequel elle se trouvait en subventionnant ces dernières années des programmes contre la pollution. Le tabac étant lui-même un agent de pollution parmi les plus dangereux. Elle a donc mis un terme à ses subventions."
[Translation]
Imperial Tobacco has no doubt realized how ridiculous it has been in subsidizing anti-pollution programs in recent years. Tobacco is itself one of the most dangerous agents of pollution. It has therefore put an end to its subsidies.

— Agatha Lassauce, "La Jasette", La Patrie (Montréal), Dec 25, 1976, p. 9.

By 1976, Imperial Tobacco was being challenged over its sponsorship of the White Owl awards and grants. These objections led to the termination of the honours and monies at the end of that year. The company's support for an environmental program was regarded as incompatible with the pollution created by tobacco smoking.
