= Abdul Samad =

Abdul Samad Abdul Samed, etc. It may be roughly translated as "servant of the Self-sufficient Master" or "servant of the Eternal Refuge".

Because the letter s is a sun letter, the letter l of the al- is assimilated to it. Thus although the name is written with letters corresponding to Abd al-Samad, the usual pronunciation corresponds to Abd as-Samad. Alternative transliterations include Abdus Samad and others, all subject to variant spacing and hyphenation.

Notable people with the surname include:

== Abdul Samad, Abdessamad, etc. ==
- Abdul-Samad Esfahani (or Abdussamad Esfahani) (died 1299), Sufi saint
- Khwaja Abdus Samad/Abd al-Samad etc. (16th century), Persian and the Mughal miniature painter
- Abdul Samad of Selangor (1804–1898), Sultan of Selangor
- Abdol-samad Mirza Ezz ed-Dowleh Saloor (1843–1929), Persian prince
- Abdul Samad Khan Achakzai (1907–1973), Pashtun nationalist leader
- Abdus Samad Azad (1922–2005), Bangladeshi politician
- Abdul Samad Ismail (1924–2008), aka Pak Samad, Malaysian journalist, writer and editor
- A. K. A. Abdul Samad (1926–1999), Indian politician
- Abdul Basit 'Abd us-Samad (1927–1988), Kurdish-Egyptian Qari
- A. Samad Said (born 1935), Malaysian poet
- Abdul Samad (guitarist) (born 1938), American R&B guitarist, usually known as Billy Davis
- Khabibullo Abdusamatov (born 1940), Uzbek-Russian astrophysicist
- Shahrir Abdul Samad (born 1949), Malaysian politician
- Adnan Zahid Abdulsamad (born 1950), Kuwaiti politician
- Khalid Abdul Samad (born 1957), Malaysian politician
- M. P. Abdussamad Samadani (born 1959), Indian politician
- Ahmed Abdel Samad (born 1972), Egyptian boxer
- Abdulsamad, surname of all members of The Boys (American band) (born 1973 - 1979)
- Abdool Samad (born 1979) Guyanese-Canadian cricketer
- Abdul Samad Rohani (ca. 1982 - 2008), Afghan journalist
- Abdessamad Chahiri (born 1982), Moroccan footballer
- Abdessamad Rafik (born 1982), Moroccan footballer
- Shariff Abdul Samat (born 1984), Singaporean footballer
- Abdul Samad (detainee), Afghan detainee in Guantanamo
- Abdul Samad Khaksar (died 2006), Afghan politician
- Abdolsamad Khorramshahi, Iranian lawyer
- Ako Abdul-Samad, American politician
- Abdul Samad Siddiqui, Indian educationist
- Datuk Abdul Samad Hj. Alias, Malaysian accountant
- Bashir Abdel Samad, Egyptian footballer
- Abdul Samad (Indian cricketer), Indian cricketer
- Abdul Samad (Pakistani cricketer), Pakistani cricketer
- Sahal Abdul Samad (born 1997), Indian professional footballer

== Abdessemed ==
- Adel Abdessemed (born 1971), Algerian-French contemporary artist
- Ibrahim Abdessemed (born 1989), 2025 Mulhouse stabbing attack perpetrator
- Tamym Abdessemed, Institute of Intercultural Management and Communication director

== See also ==
- Abd (Arabic)
- Samad (disambiguation)
