= The Deniers =

2008 book by Lawrence Solomon

- First edition cover
- Author: Lawrence Solomon
- Original title: The Deniers: The world-renowned scientists who stood up against global warming hysteria, political persecution, and fraud* *And those who are fearful to do so
- Cover artist: Charles Bork
- Language: English
- Subject: climate/climate change
- Genre: Non-fiction
- Publisher: Richard Vigilante Books
- Publication date: 2008-04-01
- Publication place: United States
- Media type: Print (Hardcover)
- Pages: 239
- ISBN: 978-0-9800763-1-8
- OCLC: 213837960
- Dewey Decimal: 363.738/74 22
- LC Class: QC981.8.G56 S57 2008

The Deniers is a 2008 book by Lawrence Solomon. Subtitled "The world-renowned scientists who stood up against global warming hysteria, political persecution, and fraud," the book draws attention to a number of scientists and others who, according to Solomon, have advanced arguments against what he calls the "alarmist" view of global warming, as presented by Al Gore, the Intergovernmental Panel on Climate Change (IPCC), the mainstream media, and others. The book is based on a series of columns Solomon wrote for Canada's National Post. It has been criticized for misquoting the scientists it featured.

== Background ==
Solomon states that, as an environmentalist and active member of the Canadian environmental, anti-nuclear, activist organization Energy Probe, he did not originally question the mainstream opinion on global warming or views that climate change deniers who reject the scientific consensus were paid shills of the Energy Lobby. Solomon, however, states that he was aware, based on his experiences opposing nuclear power during the 1970s that it was possible, "that scientists with integrity can hold unconventional and unpopular views," by dissenting with the conventional wisdom of the day. Solomon states that at a dinner in 2004, his friend and fellow environmentalist Norm Rubin remarked that the science on global warming was "settled". Solomon challenged Rubin to name three climate-change areas that he felt were settled and Solomon would try to find a credible dissenting opinion for each.

To Solomon's stated surprise, he was able to find reputable scientists who Solomon believed disputed conclusions contained in the IPCC's reports on climate change or media reports on global warming issues. Solomon began profiling these scientists in a series of columns for the National Post under the title, "The Deniers". The series began on November 28, 2006, with its debut article, Statistics needed, describing Edward Wegman's report to the United States House Committee on Energy and Commerce on the hockey stick graph.

By 2007 the series had grown to 38 separate articles. Solomon states that he was frustrated with the limitations of newspaper columns, such as a limit on how much he could write, no footnotes, and no graphs. Thus, Solomon states that he decided to write a book expanding his columns on those he labeled "Deniers".

Three of those profiled by Solomon in his "Deniers" columns disputed his portrayals of their opinions and/or research. Sami Solanki stated on his personal website that Solomon's article was a misleading account of his views and reiterated his belief that manmade greenhouse gases are responsible for global warming and that their effects would continue to be felt as concentrations increase. Solanki also stated that he felt that The National Post had similarly misquoted other scientists regarding the topic. Nir Shaviv disputed Solomon's 2007 National Post profile of some of his opinions and research findings. Shaviv stated on his blog that he was never interviewed by Solomon and that there were inaccuracies in Solomon's article, but Shaviv did state that global warming happened but he does not believe that it is caused by man. Nigel Weiss, "rebutted claims that a fall in solar activity could somehow compensate for the man-made causes of global warming" and The National Post retracted the allegation and published an apology. Solanki and Shaviv were included in Solomon's subsequent book; Weiss was not.

== Overview ==
The book expands Solomon's National Post columns about scientists who dissented in some way from the scientific consensus on climate change. In the book, Solomon questions that the science is settled. Among the issues raised are allegations of flaws in the hockey stick graph; the Stern Review; hurricane frequency and intensity; the lack of signs of global warming in Antarctica's climate; reservations on the predictability of climate models and alleged lack of falsifiability; the Singer-Revelle-Gore controversy; and the alternate solar variation theory, regarding the hypotheses of the warming being driven by the interaction of the solar wind with cosmic rays affecting cloud formation. Each chapter includes end notes with references and website addresses.

Those mentioned in the book are, in order of appearance in the book's chapters: Edward Wegman, Richard Tol, Christopher Landsea, Duncan Wingham, Robert M. Carter, Richard Lindzen, Vincent R. Gray, Syun-Ichi Akasofu, Tom Segalstad, Nir Shaviv, Zbigniew Jaworowski, Hendrik Tennekes, Freeman Dyson, Antonino Zichichi, David Bromwich, Eigil Friis-Christensen, Henrik Svensmark, Sami Solanki, Jasper Kirkby, Habibullo Abdussamatov, George Kukla, Rhodes Fairbridge, William M. Gray, Cliff Ollier, Paul Reiter, Claude Allègre, Reid Bryson, David Bellamy, and an alleged change of position by Roger Revelle. A brief curriculum vitae for each scientist is presented. In the final chapter, Solomon presents his personal point of view on the climate change debate.

== Reasons for title ==
The term "The Deniers" is controversial even among some of those profiled in the book, which often raises the question of why Solomon would choose it as the title for both his book and its related newspaper series. In explaining his decision, Soloman writes:

I have been asked many times why I titled my series and now this book The Deniers, in effect adopting their enemies' terminology. Many of the scientists in this book hate the term and deny it applies to them.

I could give several reasons, but here is the most important. The scientists are not alone in having their credibility on trial in the global warming debate. They are not the only "authorities" in the argument, and not even the most important "authorities." Most laymen, most citizens, owe most of what we think we know about global warming not to science directly, but to science as mediated by the media and by political bodies, especially the UN and our governments. We citizens, trying to discern what to do about global warming, must judge not only the credibility of the scientists but of those who claim to tell us what the scientists say. To that end, as you read through this book, judge for yourself the credibility of those who dismiss these scientists as cranks or crooks, and call them The Deniers.

As these rather dramatic reversals for the doomsday view mounted, however, I also noticed something striking about my growing cast of deniers. None of them were deniers.

== Reception ==
In The Vancouver Sun, a book review by Mark Milke, a senior fellow at conservative think-tank the Frontier Centre, based in Alberta, said The Deniers "is about the search for scientific explanations for a complex phenomenon by eminent scientists in a better position than most to judge whether a consensus exists on global warming. Their collective verdict, much varied in the particulars, is "No."

A rebuttal was published by Richard Littlemore, the senior writer at the climate change website DeSmogBlog, who argues that the scientists that are portrayed by Solomon as climate change "deniers" do not deny "that observed global warming is real" but that they in fact rather quibble about the tiny details of climate research.

Gordon McBean, in a review for Alternatives Journal, found the book biased and inaccurate. McBean concluded that the book, "Is not useful, nor is it worthy of recommendation."

== See also ==
- The Hockey Stick Illusion
- The Real Global Warming Disaster
