= E. L. R. Williamson =

Canadian economist 20th century

Ernest Landon Russell Williamson MBE ("Landon Williamson") (16 July 1911 - 28 January 2000) was a Canadian economist active in the middle decades of the 20th century.

He is best known as the author of Freedom from Fear: Can it be Achieved in Canada?, which appeared in 1945. In this distinctively Canadian work, he considers one of Franklin Roosevelt's Four Freedoms. He adopts a stance that later would characterized as "Red Tory", and argues from a conservative standpoint for what might now be called a social safety net. Such a stance, though not unusual in Canada in subsequent years, was regarded at the time as idiosyncratic, as was his early advocacy of environmentalism.

He was admitted to the Most Excellent Order of the British Empire (MBE) soon after the Second World War in recognition of this contributions to the war effort. After the war he was, in conjunction with John Bracken (who had been the Premier of Manitoba and was subsequently the leader of the Progressive Conservative Party of Canada), the moving force behind the creation of Professional and Industrial Pensions Limited. Later in his life worked as a teacher. Upon his death in 2000 an obituary was prepared by James A. Gibson.

== See also ==
- Royal Commission on Canada's Economic Prospects
- Environmental issues in Canada
- Pollution Probe
- Donald Chant
