= Busch Systems =

Busch Systems International
- Company type: Private Company
- Industry: Manufacturing
- Founded: 1985
- Founder: Craig Busch, Stephen Coskery
- Headquarters: 81 Rawson Avenue; Barrie, Ontario; L4N 6E5
- Area served: Worldwide
- Key people: Craig Busch (CEO), Bill Bradbury (VP)
- Products: Commercial Recycling & Waste Containers
- Subsidiaries: Bins4Shredding
- Website: www.buschsystems.com

Busch Systems International is a recycling, waste and compost retailer and designer headquartered in Barrie, Ontario, Canada. The business saw early success due to the popularity of the Blue Box recycling system across Canada and the United States. Since then they have expanded to produce a wide range of recycling and waste containers in a variety of materials, from metal to plastic the latter products which mostly include high percentages of recycled content.

== History ==
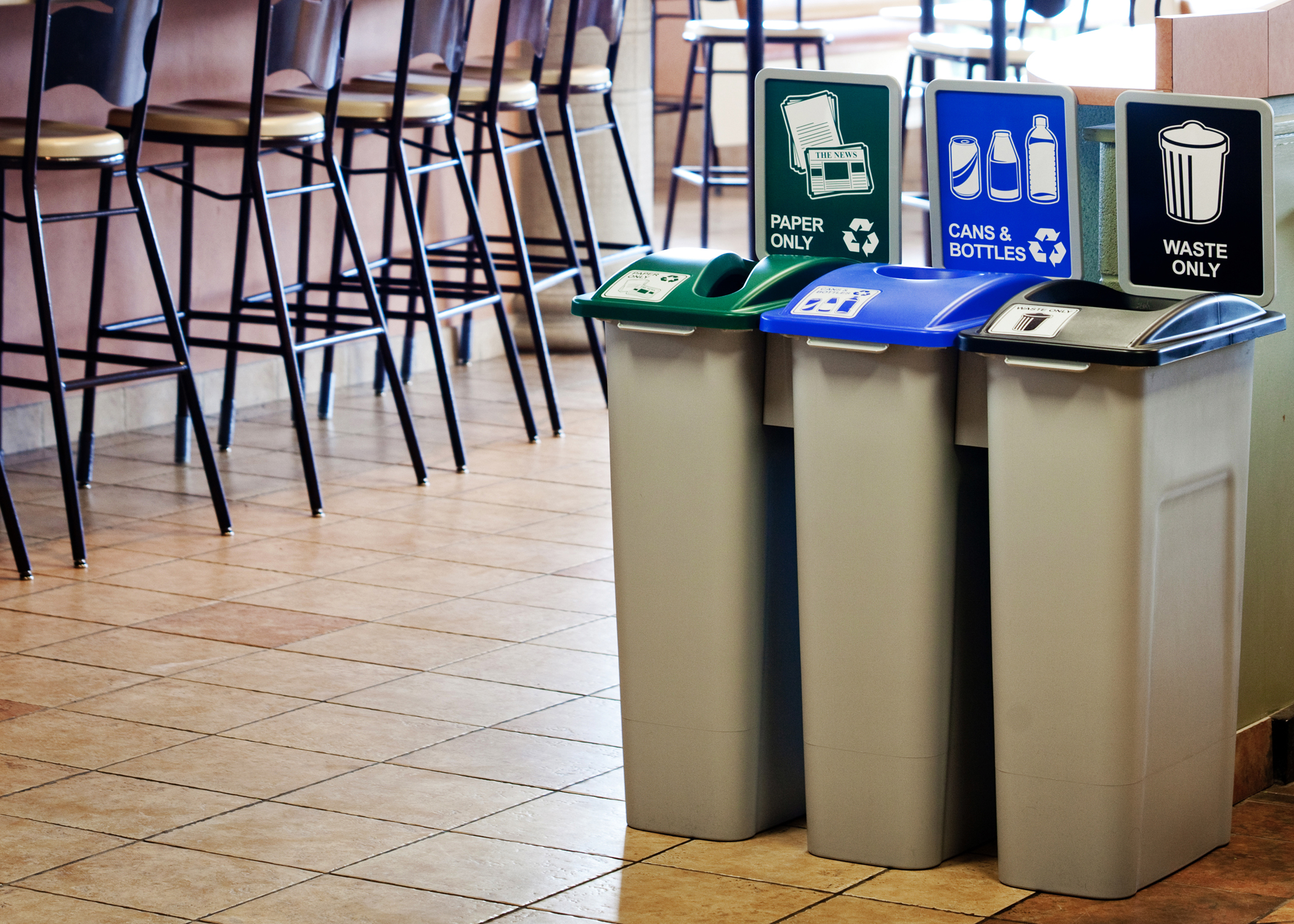
Waste Watcher Recycling Station, manufactured by Busch Systems.

Busch Systems was founded as Busch Coskery of Canada Inc., by Craig Busch and his partner Stephen Coskery in 1985. Initially producing materials handling containers, Busch and Coskery quickly saw an opportunity for growth in producing recycling bins. Their big break came when the City of Hamilton accepted their tender to supply the city with blue box recycling bins going off of only drawings of the container. The company secured a $100,000 bank loan to buy a steel injection mold needed to make the recycling bins. After buying-out Coskery fairly early on, the company was renamed Busch Systems (Busch Systems International Inc.) and the 1990s continued on to be a period of remarkable growth and change including adding a manufacturing division to produce some of the most popular containers. In 2006, the company expanded to a new location on Saunders Road in Barrie, Ontario only to move again to its present location in 2012 on Rawson Road marking yet another period of remarkable growth and expansion of which continues today. While originally finding sales success focusing on partnerships with government bodies, municipalities, etc., Busch Systems has expanded to include offerings that all types of industries and individuals. Most recently in 2014, Busch Systems launched a series of bins in the Designer Collection.

== Awards ==
- Arch Brown Entrepreneurial Award 2004
- United Way New Campaign Award 2008
- Barrie Chamber of Commerce Manufacturing Business of the Year 2012
- Barrie Chamber of Commerce Entrepreneur of the Year Award As Inspired By Arch Brown 2014
