= Alex Barris =

American-Canadian actor and writer (1922–2004)

Alex Barris CM
- Born: September 16, 1922; New York City, US
- Died: January 15, 2004 (aged 81); Toronto, Ontario, Canada
- Occupation: Actor
- Known for: Work on Front Page Challenge

Alex Paul Barris, CM (September 16, 1922 – January 15, 2004) was an American-born Canadian television actor and writer. Member of ACTRA, he was a writer and panellist for the game show Front Page Challenge.

Barris was born in New York City, and moved to Canada, residing in Scarborough, Ontario. Barris was 81 when he died due to complications from a stroke he suffered a year earlier in Toronto, Ontario.

His daughter, Kate Barris, is a celebrated children's television writer. His son, Ted, is a retired journalism professor and author of several books. In 1998, Alex Barris was made a Member of the Order of Canada.
