= Donald Chant =

Donald Alfred Chant OC FRSC (30 September 1928 – 23 December 2007) was a Canadian entomologist, zoologist, and environmental advocate, known for his work using mites in biological control. He was elected fellow of the Royal Society of Canada and the Entomological Society of Canada. Born in Toronto, he moved to Vancouver in 1945, where he earned a BA (1950) and MA (1952) from the University of British Columbia. He received his PhD from the University of London in 1956. He was chair of the Department of Biological Control at the University of California, Riverside from 1964 to 1967, then made chair of the University of Toronto Department of Zoology, where he served as professor from 1967 to his retirement in 1993, and emeritus professor from 1993 to 2007.

Donald Chant was an active and outspoken environmentalist. He received the Individual White Owl Conservation Award in 1973 for crystallizing public opinion on the need for genuine action on environmental problems.

Chant was a co-founder of Pollution Probe (1969), the Canadian Environmental Law Research Foundation (1970), and the Canadian Arctic Resources Committee (1971). Pollution Probe received the White Owl Conservation Award (then a single prize) in 1970, the Law Research Foundation received the Group White Owl Award in 1974, and the Arctic Resources Committee received the Group Award in 1975.
