= Recycling in Canada =

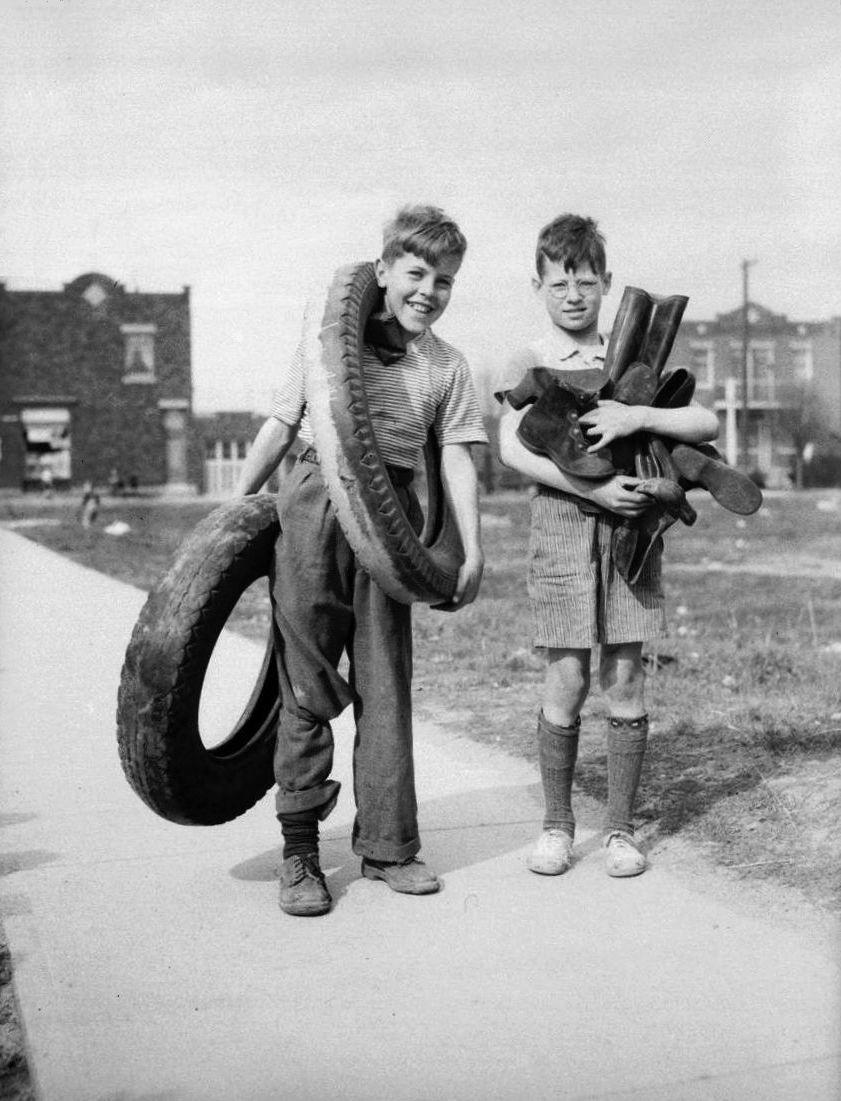
Two boys in Montreal in April 1942 collect rubber tires and boots to be recycled as part of Canada's war effort.

This article outlines the position and trends of recycling in Canada. Since the 1980s, most mid to large municipalities in most provinces have recycling programs, relying on curbside collection with either bins, boxes, or bags. These systems are not standardized, and the specific process differs for each province. Certain provinces have container-deposit systems in place for bottles, cans, and other beverage containers.

As of 2012, Canada has a recycling rate around 26.8%.

== History ==
In 1981 Resource Integration Systems (RIS) in collaboration with Laidlaw International tested the first blue box recycling system on 1500 homes in Kitchener, Ontario. Due to the success of the project the City of Kitchener put out a contract for public bid in 1984 for a recycling system citywide. Laidlaw won the bid and continued with the popular blue box recycling system. Today hundreds of cities around the world use the blue box system or a similar variation.

== By province ==
Container-deposit legislation in North America: Container deposits on most bottles and cans Container deposits only on beer/alcoholic beverage containers Container deposits discontinued No container deposits

Municipalities and provinces with recycling programs:

- Ontario
- Prince Edward Island
- Quebec – Montreal, Quebec City, Laval
- British Columbia – Metro Vancouver Region, Victoria
- Nova Scotia – seven different regions: Cape Breton, Pictou-Antigonish-Guysborough, East Hants-Cumberland-Colchester, Halifax Regional Municipality, Annapolis-Kings, South Shore-West Hants, Yarmouth Digby
- Saskatchewan – Moose Jaw, Regina, Saskatoon, Prince Albert
- Alberta – Edmonton, Calgary, Medicine Hat, Fort McMurray, Canmore
- Manitoba – Winnipeg
- Newfoundland and Labrador – St. John's, Corner Brook,

=== Alberta ===
In Alberta, the Alberta Recycling Management Authority (also known as "Alberta Recycling") is an arm's-length body set up by the Government of Alberta under the Ministry of the Environment to coordinate recycling in the province. It administers the surcharge that has been added to the price of electronics, paint, and tires sold in the province since 2005 to pay for the recycling of those products in Alberta, and it helps to administer the province's household hazardous waste disposal program.

A separate management authority, the Beverage Container Management Board (BCMB), is responsible for recycling of beverage containers. Beverage container recycling regulations were first introduced province-wide in 1972, but the BCMB was created in 1997 to create a provincial oversight body for the industry. The BCMB oversees two non-profit corporations which process the materials, the Alberta Beer Container Corporation (ABCC) for standard-sized beer bottles (which reuses rather than recycles the bottles) and the Alberta Beverage Container Recycling Corporation (ABCRC) for all other beverage containers. Containers are collected at privately owned, for-profit bottle depots. As of 2011 there are over 200 such bottle depots in Alberta, which are members of the Alberta Bottle Depot Association.

The Recycling Council of Alberta is a registered charity which has promoted recycling in Alberta since 1987. Specific industry groups lobby for their niche within the recycling sector, such as the Alberta Plastics Recycling Association.

Curbside recycling of newsprint, cardboard, plastic packaging, and other non-food household wastes is the responsibility of the individual municipalities of Alberta. Most of Alberta's most populous municipalities have blue box, blue bag, or blue bin recycling container programs. The two largest municipalities, however, adopted waste-diverting policies at a very different pace. Edmonton began a pilot project in curbside recycling for single-family houses in 1986 and adopted it citywide in 1988, expanding over the years to include more items (Christmas trees in 1990, and construction waste in 2008), and higher levels of processing including large-scale composting and capturing methane to produce energy. In addition, the scope of collection has expanded to include multi-family buildings in 2001 and businesses in 2010. It is expected that when the waste-to-biofuel plant is completed in 2012, Edmonton will divert 90% of its waste from landfills.

By contrast Calgary conducted a pilot project on curbside recycling in 1991 and then abandoned curbside collection for a drop-off system until a second pilot program in 2004, and currently collects recyclates only at private houses, with no plans to introduce collection at condo and apartment buildings before 2015.

Edmonton started their curbside recycling program in 1988. In 2021, Edmonton transitioned from a bag to cart system for garbage and food waste collection.

On September 10, 2020, the Edmonton city council approved a 25-year waste strategy to reduce the landfill waste by 90%. The city is also transitioning into a new cart system rather from the blue bag system to dispose of waste.

=== Ontario ===
As of January 1, 2026, under changing provincial regulations, municipalities in Ontario do not handle recycling, instead Circular Materials, an extended producer responsibility model is used whereby all the recycling in the province is handled uniformly by the producers of this material. Flexible plastic, toothpaste tubes, black plastic and hot beverage cups are all new materials accepted under this model.

=== Newfoundland and Labrador ===
In 2008 the city of St. John's became the last to introduce curbside recycling in Canada, a pilot was launched in 2007 with recycling introduced in 2009

== Recycling rate ==
Canada has an extremely high rate of plastic waste of 3 million tonnes per year. Out of all the material that Canadians dispose of in the recycling bin, 12% is exported to other countries, such as Malaysia, where it is processed and damages the environment and the health of the population. Of the remaining 88%, 86% goes to the landfill, 9% is recycled, and the rest is burned for energy.

According to a 2019 study, only 9 percent of waste in Canada goes to recycling.

As of 2019, British Columbia has the highest recycling rate, at 69 percent. In Ontario, the recycling rate has declined from 60.2% in 2018 to 57.3% in 2019.

== Collection processes ==
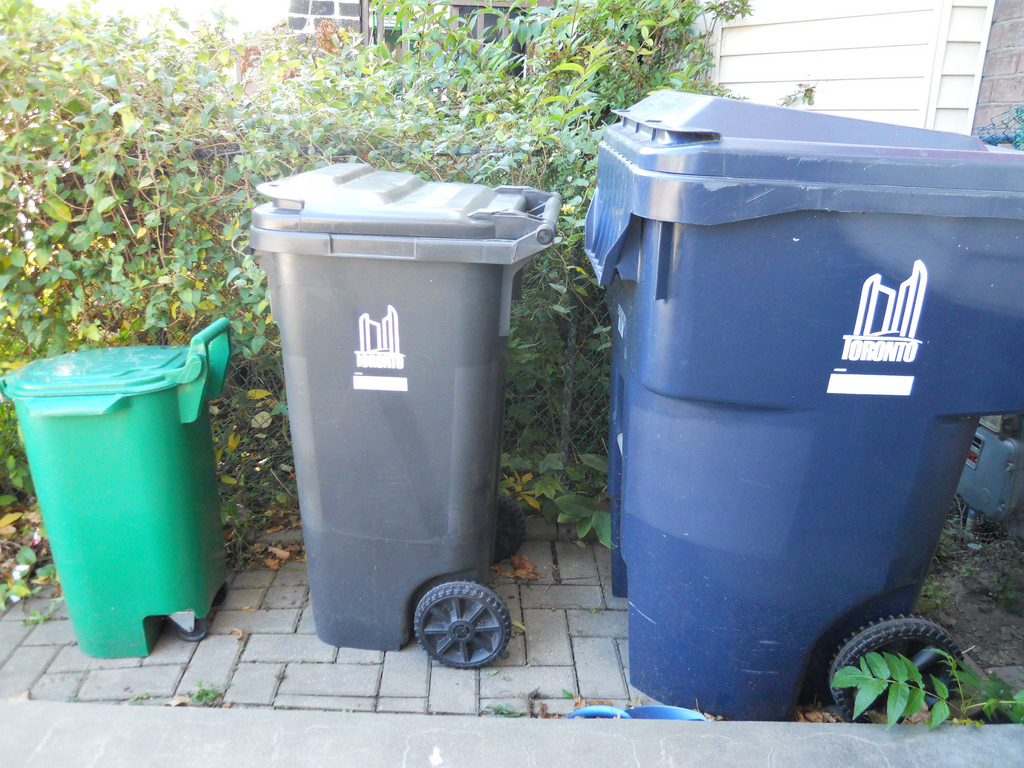
These three differently-coloured bins are used to sort waste in Toronto.

The curbside collection systems for recyclates vary across Canada:

- Blue bin – Ontario, British Columbia, Saskatchewan, Quebec and Manitoba, New Brunswick
- Green bin – Toronto, York Region, Peel Region, Hamilton, Montreal, Halifax Regional Municipality, Durham Region, Barrie, Ontario, British Columbia
- Compost bin (green), waste bin (black) and blue bags for recycling in Edmonton, Alberta
- Blue bag used in Newfoundland and Labrador, Nova Scotia, Prince Edward Island, New Brunswick

== Materials collected ==
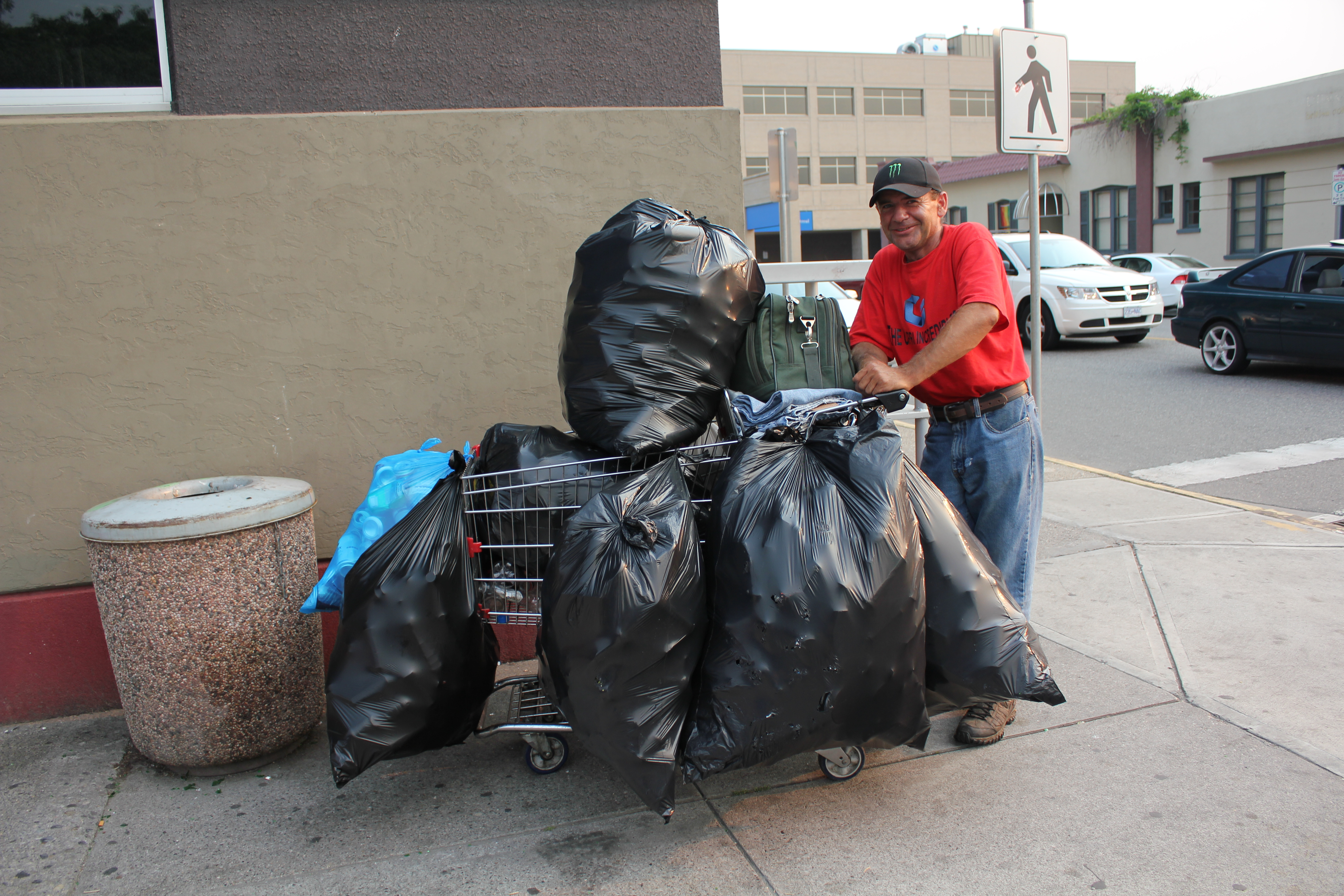
A bottle-picker in Kelowna, British Columbia, in 2010

The different types of recyclable materials collected include:

- Newspapers, including paper flyers
- Office paper and letter mail
- Envelopes (without bubble wrap inside)
- Glass jars and bottles — some city's like St. John's have choose not to accept glass,
- Metal cans – beverage and soup cans
- Books, magazines, telephone books
- Plastics – Type 1 PETE and 2 HDPE and 4 LDPE
- Compostable materials (excluding grease)
- Toys and clothing – for re-sale or re-use
- Motor oil
- Tires – some re-treaded, some mixed with asphalt for road resurfacing; re-used in playgrounds; pylons used for construction and road work crews
- Beer bottles through deposit systems (Beer Store program in Ontario, Green Depot in Newfoundland)
- Liquor bottles through deposit systems
- Pop cans and bottles through deposit systems (especially Quebec and NL)
- Ink cartridges
- Cell phone and most batteries (including automotive)
- Fluorescent lamp recycling
- Styrofoam within Nova Scotia in most regions
- Clothing – some sold for re-use, re-purposed locally or shipped overseas

== See also ==
- Environment of Canada
