= Samad (disambiguation) =

Samad is a male Semitic given name. It may also refer to:

- As-Samad (name of God), one of the names of God in Islam
- Samad (UAV)
- Samad (crater), crater on Enceladus
- Samad, Iran
- Samad, Syria, village in southern Syria
- Samad al-Shan, archaeological site on Oman
