= Ted Barris =

Canadian writer and broadcaster

Ted Barris CM
- Barris as the guest speaker at the Oshawa Historical Society, 2013
- Born: July 12, 1949 (age 77); Toronto, Ontario, Canada
- Occupations: Author; Journalist; Educator; Broadcaster
- Spouse: Jayne MacAulay
- Relatives: Alex Barris (1923–2004) (father)
- Writing career
- Notable awards: Libris Award
- Website: tedbarris.com

Ted Barris CM (born July 12, 1949, in Toronto, Ontario) is a Canadian writer, journalist, professor and broadcaster. He writes a weekly column, "The Barris Beat", and is a regular contributor to The Globe and Mail and the National Post. His non-fiction works focus on Canada's military heritage. Barris has authored 18 books.

== Early years ==
Barris was born in Toronto in 1949; his father, Alex Barris was a well-known Canadian author and broadcaster, and inspired his son's career in writing and broadcasting. In grade school, he wanted to become a writer with his first research for a term paper, "The Causes of the War of 1812", leading to his elementary school teacher (Mike Malott) encouraging him. Barris became interested in history and historical writing, a genre that would dominate his later writing career.

== Writing career ==
While attending high school, Barris began his writing career. He contributed stories on school activities to the neighbourhood weekly, the Agincourt Mirror, and earned spending money. Barris graduated from Ryerson Polytechnical Institute’s three-year Radio and Television Arts program in 1971.

Throughout his time at Ryerson Polytechnical Institute, Barris had a part-time job at CJRT-FM, hosting the weekend all-night show. He also occasionally appeared on CBC Radio as a news reader. During this period, he began to explore documentary subjects, co-writing and co-producing half a dozen programs for CBC Radio's weekend youth program, Action Set.

Concentrating on a career in writing and broadcasting, in the 1970s, Barris wrote freelance music reviews for The Globe and Mail and other industry magazines, including Wingit, Pop and Grapevine. He also wrote for Canadian Composer, RPM Magazine, Rolling Stone (San Francisco), Film News and Country Sky. Barris considered a staff position with Warner Bros. Records but chose to work at the University of Saskatchewan, writing, directing and editing educational TV. A short documentary film he wrote and directed on noise pollution won the White Owl Conservation Award (Montreal) in 1973.

After returning to Ryerson Polytechnical Institute, Barris graduated in 1976 with a degree in the Bachelor of Applied Arts program. While in Saskatchewan, he completed the research that led to his first book, Fire Canoe: Prairie Steamboat Days Revisited, as well as to his decision to concentrate on a freelance career.

For the next two decades, Barris travelled throughout Canada on various assignments, alternately working for CBC Radio and National Public Radio, as well as appearing on television programs as host and broadcaster, while continuing his career in Canadian historical non-fiction. While residing in Alberta, Barris continued writing based on local subjects before beginning a number of books on military subjects, an area of speciality that now is the focus of his work.

Barris is a retired professor of journalism. He taught at Toronto's Centennial College. He resides in Uxbridge, Ontario.

== Awards ==
- 2015 – Certificate of Honor from Stalag Luft III Prisoners of War Association
- 2014 – Libris Award (Best Non-Fiction) (shared with Chris Hadfield)
- 2006 – Bear Hackle Award, by the 78th Fraser Highlanders (Canadian) Regiment
- 1993 – Canada 125 Medal “For service to Canada and community.”
- 2022 – Order of Canada (Member)

== Selected bibliography ==
- Dam Busters: Canadian Airmen and The Secret Raid Against Nazi Germany (2018)
- Fire Canoe: Prairie Steamboat Days Revisited 2nd Edition (1977)
- The Great Escape: A Canadian Story (2013)
- Victory at Vimy: Canada Comes of Age, April 9–12, 1917 (2007)
- Juno: Canadians at D-Day June 6, 1944 (2004)
- Deadlock in Korea : Canadians at War, 1950–1953 (1998)
- Playing Overtime: A Celebration of Oldtimers Hockey (1995)
- Days of Victory: Canadians Remember, 1939–1945 (1995)
- Behind the Glory: Canada's Role in the Allied Air War (1992)
- Fire Canoe: Prairie Steamboat Days Revisited. Dundurn Press 2015. 26 September 2015. ISBN 9781459732100.
