= Lawrence Solomon =

Canadian writer

- Born: 1948 (age 77–78); Bucharest, Romanian People's Republic
- Occupations: Writer and Manager of Energy Probe Research Foundation
- Organization: Managing director of the Energy Probe Research Foundation
- Children: Essie and Catharine
- Website: Solomon's blog at Energy Probe

Lawrence Solomon is a Canadian writer on the environment and the executive director of Energy Probe, a Canadian non-governmental environmental policy organization, a member of the advisory board of Rebel News, and a columnist for The Epoch Times. His writing has appeared in a number of newspapers, including the National Post, where he has a column, and he is the author of several books on energy resources, urban sprawl, and global warming, among them The Conserver Solution (1978), Energy Shock (1980), Toronto Sprawls: A History (2007), and The Deniers (2008).

Solomon opposed nuclear power based on its economic cost, has promoted climate change denial, and has been critical of government approaches and policies used to address environmental concerns. However, Solomon has recently changed tack to be somewhat supportive of nuclear power

== Career and environmental activities ==
Solomon writes that he was an adviser to President Jimmy Carter's task force on the environment in the late 1970s, which released The Global 2000 Report to the President in 1980. He has a regular column in The National Post, and has written for The Globe and Mail, National Review Online, CBS News, and The Wall Street Journal. He was the editor and publisher of the defunct Next City magazine. He has also written for American Forests, an environmental conservation organization.

Serving as executive director of the Urban Renaissance Institute, a division of Energy Probe, Solomon has advocated environmental protection, conservation, and safeguards throughout the world, especially in non-affluent nations. He supports reforms in foreign aid, putting a stop to nuclear power expansion, and supports the privatization of transport projects and the expansion of toll roads. "I note that Lawrence Solomon continues to advocate road tolls, and the privatization of the TTC (like London) for Toronto's transportation system." Bruce Campion-Smith In his columns and his book Toronto Sprawls: A History, he blames government policy for exacerbating and encouraging sprawl. He is a critic of subsidies to rural Canada, and has criticized Ontario Hydro's actions and projects and their effects on Canada's environment. He writes that he was very active during the 1970s and 1980s with Energy Probe in opposing attempts to expand the use of nuclear power in Canada.

== Global warming ==
In a series of articles and a companion book published in 2008, The Deniers, Solomon writes about scientists whose views and research promote a contrarian view of global warming in opposition to the consensus of thirty four National Academies of Science, the WMO and the IPCC. Reviews of the book have appeared in the Washington Times, Vancouver Sun, Alternatives Journal, and other publications. A number of reviewers point out that most of the scientists profiled in the book do not actually deny climate change. These reviewers characterize the book as containing selective quotes of scientists' disagreements on the details of climate change in order to present the impression that there is no consensus on climate change. In fact, despite the title, they report that Solomon acknowledges in the book that "I … noticed something striking about my growing cast of deniers. None of them were deniers."

Solomon's blog has been mentioned in U.S. News & World Report's website concerning carbon emissions reduction legislation.

== Clash of civilizations ==
On December 29, 2010, Solomon predicted a "clash of civilizations between Islam and the west," over the secession of southern Sudan. He predicted that northern Sudan would reject the secession, which would then pit "a club of non-Islamic nations" (including what he calls "Christian Kenya", "Christian Ethiopia" and Israel) against Islamic ones (including Iran).

== Green Beanery ==
In 2004, Solomon founded Green Beanery, a non-profit online merchant specializing in organic coffee beans produced by small, independent farmers. The company is located in downtown Toronto and includes a cafe where customers can sample a wide variety of coffee. The cafe opened in 2008 and closed in March 2020; the online business is to continue. The profits from Green Beanery go to Probe International.

== Published works ==
Solomon's books include:

- The Conserver Solution (Doubleday, 1978 ISBN 978-0-385-14533-6)
- Energy shock: After the oil runs out (Doubleday, 1980 ISBN 978-0-385-17161-8)
- Breaking up Ontario Hydro's Monopoly (Energy Probe, 1982)
- Power at What Cost (Doubleday, 1984 ISBN 978-0-919849-03-7)
- In the Name of Progress (with Patricia Adams) (Earthscan, 1992 ISBN 978-1-85383-121-8)
- Toronto Sprawls: A History (University of Toronto Press, 2007 ISBN 978-0-7727-8618-0)
- The Deniers: The world-renowned scientists who stood up against global warming hysteria, political persecution, and fraud (Richard Vigilante Books, 2008 ISBN 978-0-9800763-1-8)
