= Anti-nuclear movement in Canada =

Social movement opposing nuclear power and weapons in Canada

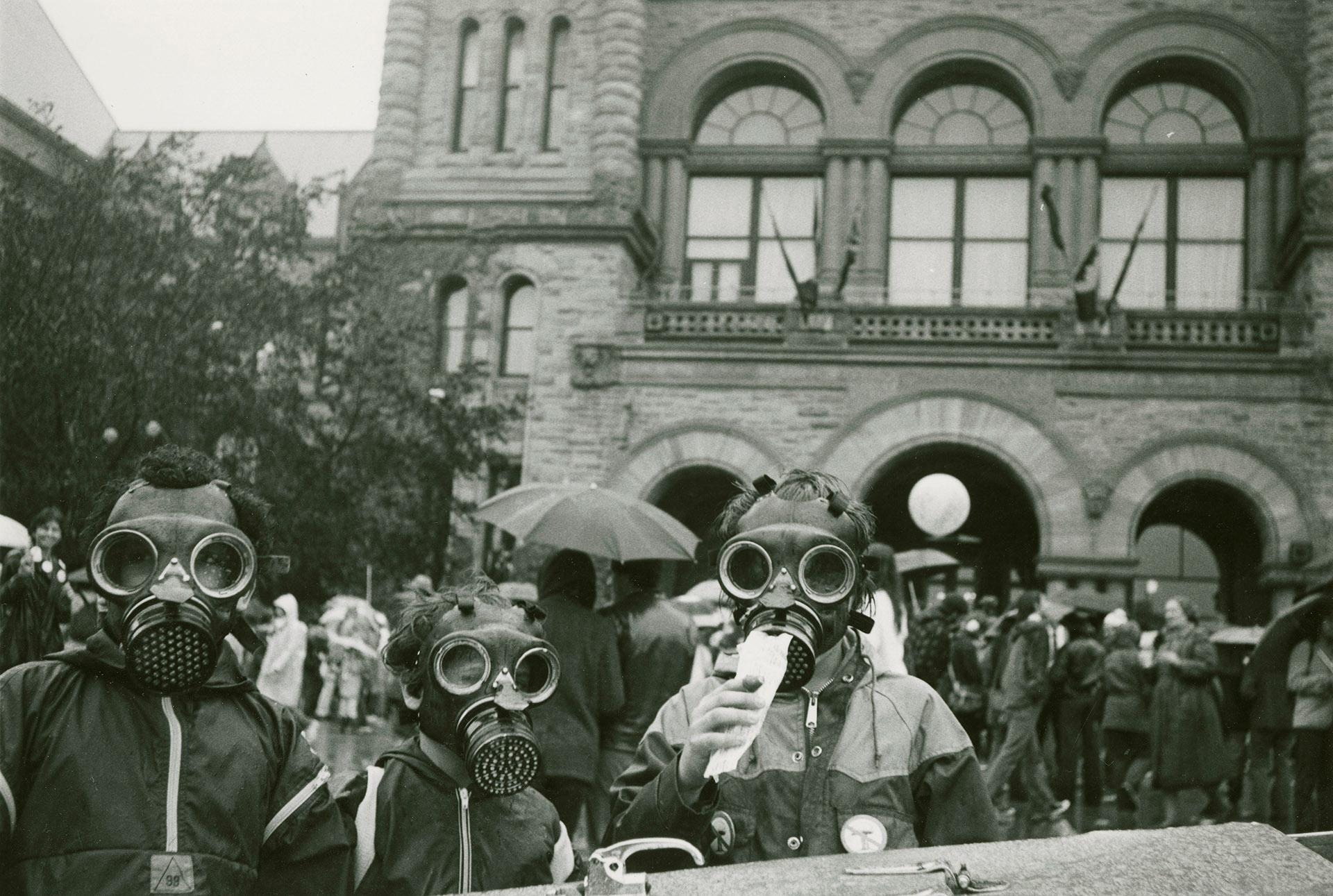
A Nuclear disarmament demonstration at Queen's Park in Toronto, 1982

The anti-nuclear movement in Canada is a social movement comprising environmental organizations, citizen groups, and indigenous communities that oppose the use of nuclear power and nuclear weapons. The movement includes major organizations like Greenpeace and the Sierra Club, as well as specialized groups such as Energy Probe and the Canadian Coalition for Nuclear Responsibility.

== History ==
The movement emerged from the broader peace movement during the Cold War, fueled by concerns over nuclear arms proliferation and the perceived ineffectiveness of international institutions in resolving geopolitical tensions.

=== Early organizations (1958–1960) ===
- Edmonton Committee for the Control of Radiation Hazards (ECCRH): Founded in 1958 by Mary Von Stolk, it was Canada's first anti-nuclear organization. It focused on public education about nuclear fallout dangers rather than disarmament.
- Canadian Committee for the Control of Radiation Hazards (CCCRH): Evolved from the ECCRH to reflect its national expansion. It advocated for the rejection of nuclear weapons in the Canadian military.
- Voice of Women: Established in 1960 after the U-2 Affair, this group lobbied politicians and built international grassroots networks. It gained endorsement from Maryon Pearson, wife of opposition leader Lester B. Pearson.

== Public opinion and context ==
A 2006 BBC poll revealed that 91% of Canadians were concerned about energy-related environmental issues, including climate change. When asked about nuclear energy:

- 52% supported building new nuclear plants to reduce reliance on fossil fuels.
- 43% opposed nuclear expansion.
- 91% favored tax incentives for renewable energy development.

=== Nuclear industry performance ===
As of 2007, Canada’s 22 nuclear reactors had a lifetime load factor of 68.5%, below global standards. CANDU reactors have faced technical problems with safety implications.

=== Uranium mining ===
Canada is the world’s second-largest uranium producer, generating hundreds of millions of tonnes of radioactive waste and contaminated water.

== Activist organizations ==
=== Indigenous opposition ===
- Algonquin Tribe: Since 2007, the Algonquin have blockaded uranium mining operations on sacred lands near Kingston, Ontario.
- Indigenous groups in Saskatchewan have a long-standing tradition of opposing uranium mining.

=== National advocacy groups ===
Campaign for Nuclear Phaseout (CNP)
A coalition of over 300 public interest groups advocating for nuclear power phaseout. In 2003, it published Phasing Out Nuclear Power in Canada, outlining a transition to renewable energy and efficiency.

Canadian Coalition for Nuclear Responsibility (CCNR)
Founded in 1975, it focuses on education and research related to nuclear energy. Headed by Gordon Edwards.

Energy Probe
A consumer and environmental research group opposing nuclear power. Its policies influenced Ontario’s Liberal, NDP, and Conservative parties.

Greenpeace Canada
Advocates for halting nuclear expansion and shutting existing plants, promoting renewable energy instead.

Pembina Institute
A non-profit environmental policy research organization. In 2006, it published Nuclear Power in Canada: An Examination of Risks, Impacts and Sustainability.

Sierra Club Canada
Active since 1963, it argues that nuclear power is plagued by cost overruns, accidents, and unresolved waste issues.

=== Regional and local groups ===
Energy Quest 4 Nanticoke
Opposed nuclear development in Haldimand/Norfolk/Brant/Hamilton, Ontario.

Inter-Church Uranium Committee Educational Co-operative (ICUCEC)
A Saskatchewan church coalition opposing uranium mining and nuclear development.

Nuclear Free Great Lakes Campaign
A cross-border coalition seeking to eliminate radioactive contamination in the Great Lakes Basin.

Peace River Environmental Society
Successfully campaigned against Bruce Power’s proposal to build a nuclear plant in northern Alberta (2007–2011).

Port Hope Community Health Concerns Committee (PHCHCC)
Researches health impacts of long-term radiation exposure in Port Hope, Ontario.

Port Hope Families Against Radiation Exposure (PH-FARE)
Monitors nuclear industry activities in Port Hope, opposing uranium enrichment.

Safe and Green Energy Peterborough
Received federal funding in 2009 to review the Darlington Nuclear Power Plant expansion.

Save Our Saskatchewan
A local group opposing nuclear development in Saskatchewan.

== See also ==
- Canadian Voice of Women for Peace
- Energy policy of Canada
- Gordon Edwards
- List of anti-nuclear groups
- List of Canadian nuclear facilities
- Maisie Shiell
- Nuclear power in Canada
- Ontario Sustainable Energy Association
- Renewable energy commercialization
