= Energy Probe =

Energy Probe is a non-governmental social, economic, and environmental policy organization based in Toronto, Canada known recently for denying man-made climate change.

It was founded in 1970 as a sister project of Pollution Probe. In this early period, the focus was on the publicly owned Ontario Hydro's predictions of energy usage seeing continual growth and their demands to build a huge fleet of nuclear reactors to service this demand. They published a number of reports in the late 1970s estimating usage in 2000 would be significantly below that predicted by Hydro, numbers that were matched by those of the Ontario Ministry of Energy's own calculations, and eventually, Hydro itself. The organization is well known for its anti-nuclear energy stance, opposing nuclear energy production in Canada, especially in the case of nuclear plants in Ontario, on the grounds that nuclear power production is uneconomic.

In 1980, the two organizations formally separated and the Energy Probe Research Foundation (EPRF) was created, describing itself as "one of Canada's largest independent think tanks, with 17 public policy researchers", focusing "on the economic, environmental, and social impacts of the use and production of energy." After its separation and incorporation, and led from then on by Lawrence Solomon, EPRF began to accept funding from the oil and gas industry, and, in 1983, began a campaign "to educate Canadians to the social, environmental and economic benefits of less regulation in the petroleum field." In the 1980s, the organization was also responsible for a proposal to dismantle Hydro in favour of privatization.

Additional divisions within Energy Probe are the Urban Renaissance Institute, Probe International, Environment Probe, the Environmental Bureau of Investigation, and the Consumer Policy Institute.

== Views on global warming and climate change ==
EPRF argues that "the science behind competing theories of global warming is not yet settled", stating that "global cooling" is on the rise, that climate change is surrounded by "clouds of conspiracy", and that climate science is "corrupt" and the "greatest scientific fraud of the century". EPRF also argues that fossil fuels, especially gasoline, shale oil, natural gas, and coal, are clean and environmentally beneficial choices, putting it at odds with expected notions of environmental organizations.

Founder (and National Post columnist) Lawrence Solomon published a series of columns and a book in 2008 titled "The Deniers: The World Renowned Scientists Who Stood Up Against Global Warming Hysteria, Political Persecution, and Fraud" naming 37 climate scientists and authors as "climate change skeptics" or "climate deniers". Several of these scientists and authors published their rejection of this characterization of their views, among them Sami Solanki of the Max Planck Institute, Nigel Weiss of the University of Cambridge, and Carl Wunsch of the Massachusetts Institute of Technology. The National Post, on the urging of Professor Nigel Weiss, later issued a retraction and apology for the allegations made in the column.

Founder Lawrence Solomon was a speaker at the conservative and libertarian public policy think tank The Heartland Institute's 2009 International Conference on Climate Change. The Heartland Institute holds similarly skeptical views about man-made climate change and related global warming, stating that the claims that global warming is a crisis are unscientific and delusional. Solomon remains on the rolls of the Heartland Institute as a policy expert.

EPRF has also been critical of the Kyoto Protocol as well as of the Paris Accords.

== Funding ==
The EPRF is a registered Canadian charity. Apart from donated income, it receives all of the profits of its "non-profit" organic coffee company and cafe in Toronto, Green Beanery. The cafe opened in 2008 and closed in March 2020; the online business is to continue. In 2012, the EPRF brought in $1.3 million in non-donation revenue.

== See also ==
- Anti-nuclear movement in Canada
- Free-market environmentalism
- Pollution Probe
