= 2025 Mulhouse stabbing attack =

Mass stabbing in Alasce, France

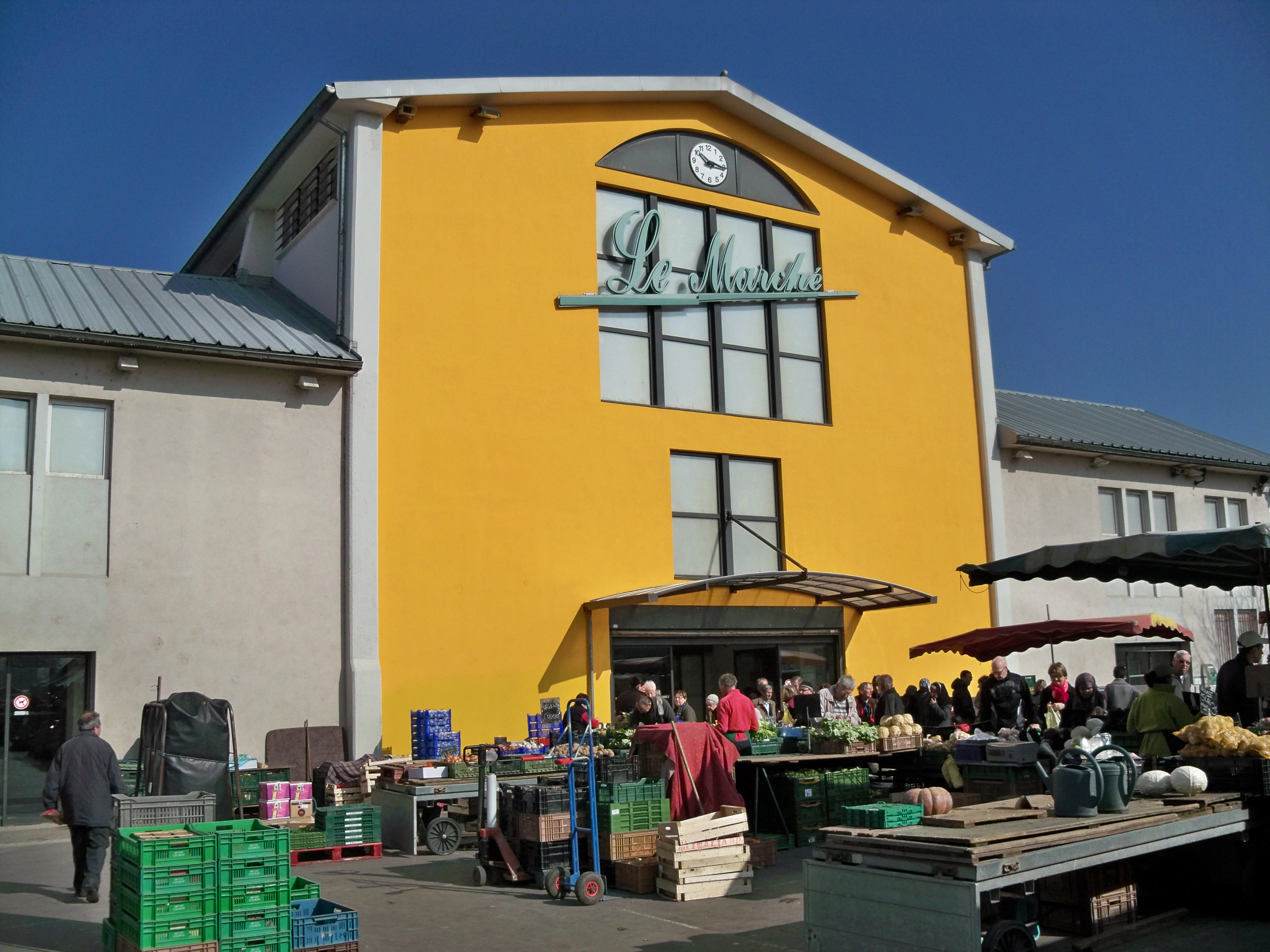
- The market where the attack occurred pictured in 2012
- Location: 47°45′04″N 7°19′45″E; Mulhouse, Alsace, France
- Date: 22 February 2025 c.3:40 p.m. (CET)
- Attack type: Mass stabbing
- Weapons: Knife, screwdriver
- Deaths: 1
- Injuries: 7
- Victim: Lino Sousa Loureiro
- Motive: Islamic extremism
- Accused: Brahim Abdessemed

On 22 February 2025, a knife attack at a market in Mulhouse, France, left a 69-year-old Portuguese man dead and several police officers injured. The suspect, who was arrested at the scene, was identified as an Algerian immigrant who had served a prison sentence for a terrorist offence and was under an order to leave the country.

== Attack ==
At about 15.40 CET, the attacker, who was armed with a knife and a screwdriver, approached two police officers in the market on the covered canal in Mulhouse. He stabbed one in the neck and one in the chest, seriously injuring both. He then fatally stabbed a member of the public who had intervened. The victim was named as 69-year-old Lino Sousa Loureiro from Ermesinde, Portugal, who had been living in Mulhouse since 1992. A demonstration in support of Democratic Republic of Congo amid the M23 campaign was taking place nearby. The attacker was arrested at the scene; five police officers received minor injuries during the arrest. The police officer who had been stabbed in the chest was discharged from hospital the same day, while the officer who was stabbed in the neck remained in hospital.

== Suspect ==
The suspect was identified as a 37-year-old Algerian, Brahim Abdessemed, who was born on 20 April 1987 in Batna, Algeria, and had arrived illegally in France in 2014. Abdessemed was on a terrorist watchlist and in December 2023 was convicted of incitement to terrorism after he posted a video to Facebook in the wake of the October 7 attacks. In the video, he called on Muslims to take up arms and fight the unbelievers. He was sentenced to six months imprisonment, of which he served four months. After his release he was put under house arrest and ordered to leave the country. During a press conference on 23 February 2025, minister of the interior Bruno Retailleau said that while in detention Abdessemed had been diagnosed as having a "schizophrenic profile". According to Retailleau, France had tried ten times to deport Abdessemed but had failed as Algeria refused to accept him.

== Investigation ==
Following the attack, the local prosecutor's office initiated a terrorism investigation, prompted by witness reports that the perpetrator had exclaimed "Allahu Akbar" ("God is great" in Arabic) during the assault. The investigation was handed over to the National Anti-Terrorism Prosecutor's Office (PNAT). Two members of the suspect's family and the person with whom he lodged were arrested.

== Responses ==
French President Emmanuel Macron said that there was no doubt that the stabbing was an "Islamist terrorist attack", while offering his condolences to the family of the victim and saying the nation stood behind them. He reaffirmed his administration's commitment to combating terrorism in France.

France Interior Minister Bruno Retailleau visited Mulhouse on the evening of the attack and gave a press conference. He gave details of the suspect and said that Algeria had blocked France's attempts to deport him.

The Mayor of Mulhouse, Michele Lutz, said on social media: "horror has seized our city". Vigils were held in Mulhouse, and support offered to the bereaved and injured. On the evening of 24 February, more than a thousand people gathered in front of the town hall in Mulhouse and heard Lutz pay tribute to Lino Sousa Loureiro and the injured police officers. The vigil ended with a minute's silence and a rendition of La Marseillaise. The Mayor of Walsall, a town in England which is twinned with Mulhouse, sent a message of support to Lutz.

== See also ==
- 2025 Villach stabbing attack
- 2025 Aschaffenburg stabbing attack
- List of terrorist incidents in France
