= Gordon Edwards (activist) =

Canadian scientist and nuclear consultant (born 1940)

- Born: 1940 (age 85–86); Canada
- Education: University of Toronto; University of Chicago

Gordon Edwards (born 1940) is the president and co-founder of the nonprofit organization Canadian Coalition for Nuclear Responsibility.

Edwards was born in Lansdowne, Ontario and grew up in Toronto. His parents were both pharmacists, and he was the youngest of five children. He graduated from the University of Toronto in 1961 with a gold medal in Mathematics and Physics and a Woodrow Wilson Fellowship. He later obtained two master's degrees from the University of Chicago, and in 1972, he obtained a Ph.D. in Mathematics from Queen's University. He taught mathematics at Vanier College in Montreal. He is known as a leading anti-nuclear activist in Canada.

Edwards gained public profile after he debated Edward Teller, the famous physicist and 'father of the hydrogen bomb', on live Canadian national television on October 17, 1974, becoming known as a leading anti-nuclear activist. The Great Debate was moderated by Canadian television personality and author, Pierre Berton. The resolution debated was: "nuclear power plants are necessary and should be constructed." Edwards argued against the proposition and won by 60 to 36 votes. Since then, Edwards has been featured on Canadian national television broadcasts and in documentaries as a critic of the nuclear industry. He was featured on two episodes of the CBC's The Nature of Things hosted by David Suzuki. The first, in 1998, was called The Friendly Atom and considered how nuclear technology has been used for peaceful purposes and for war. Edwards and Alex Mayman, Vice-President of Atomic Energy of Canada Ltd., were interviewed in the episode. The second, in 2010, was called My Nuclear Neighbour and looked at small towns in Ontario and Alberta hosting or considering nuclear reactors. The episode featured Edwards alongside Duncan Hawthorne, the president and CEO of Bruce Power, the world's largest operating nuclear facility. In 2011, Edwards was interviewed over 20 times about the Fukushima nuclear accident on CBC Television News, CTV Television News, and Canada-AM (CTV).

Edwards has published articles and reports on radiation standards, radioactive wastes, uranium mining, nuclear proliferation, the economics of nuclear power, its health implications, and non-nuclear energy strategies. Edwards co-authored a 1976 nation-wide study of the role of the mathematical sciences in business, industry, government, education and science in seven volumes. Mathematical Sciences in Canada was commissioned and published by the Science Council of Canada.

Edwards has provided consulting services on nuclear issues to governmental and non-governmental bodies at the provincial, territorial, national and international levels. He has also provided invited testimony and expert sworn testimony to legislative bodies, commissions, and courts. He has worked as a consultant for governmental bodies such as the Auditor General of Canada, the Select Committee on Ontario Hydro Affairs, and the Ontario Royal Commission on Electric Power Planning. In 2006, he received the Nuclear-Free Future Award in the "education" category.

== See also ==
- Anti-nuclear movement in Canada
