= Blue box recycling system =

Waste management system in Canada

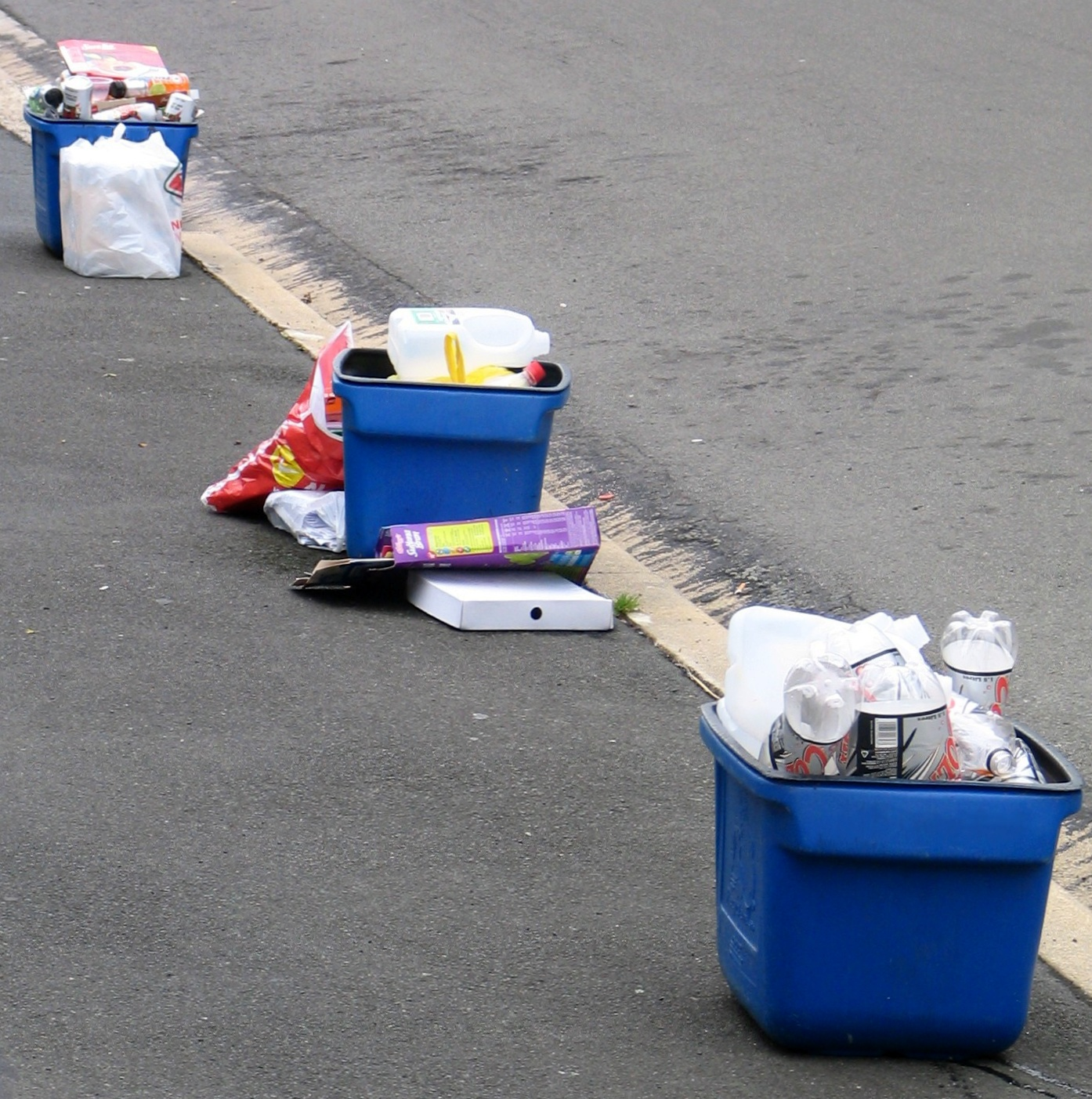
Blue box recycling bins

The blue box recycling system (BBRS) was initially a waste management system used by Canadian municipalities to collect source separated household waste materials for the purpose of recycling. The first full-scale community wide BBRS was implemented in 1983 by the waste management contractor Ontario Total Recycling Systems Ltd. (a subsidiary of Laidlaw Waste Systems) for the City of Kitchener, Ontario. The blue box recycling system was implemented as part of the city's waste management procedures. The blue box system and variations of it remain in place in hundreds of cities around the world.

== Overview ==
Today, many municipalities operate blue box programs that accept all forms of paper materials, most plastic packaging, glass containers, aluminum cans and steel cans. For example, the City of Greater Napanee accepts:

- Glass bottles and jars, including all glass containers which previously contained a food or beverage product.
- Metal food and beverage cans, including all hard shell steel or aluminum containers which previously contained a food or beverage product.
- Aluminum foil, meaning food wrap, food packaging and kitchenware such as pie plates made from a thin sheet of aluminum.
- Rigid-shell plastic containers, including polyethylene terephthalate (PETE #I), high-density polyethylene (HDPE #2), low-density polyethylene (LDPE #4), polypropylene (PP #5) and polystyrene (PS #6), which previously contained a non-hazardous consumer product.
- Rigid foam plastic containers.
- Newspapers, magazines, flyers and household papers.
- Old boxboard and old cardboard (non-waxed, flattened & bundled no larger than 30″×30″×8″).
- Bundled plastic bags (LDPE).
- Other material as designated by the town from time to time.

The municipality provides the blue boxes to residents in areas serviced by the recycling program. This usually includes all single-family homes and townhouse units receiving garbage collection. Tenants of apartment buildings typically do not use blue boxes but rather deposit their household recyclable materials in larger containers made available.

== History ==
=== Early stages ===
An organization called Pollution Probe was formed in 1969 by students and faculty at the University of Toronto and in 1971, members published a report stressing the need for recycling. Also in 1971, the Canadian Federal Government first established a national Department of the Environment, known as Environment Canada, with Environmental protection as one of its priorities. The Ontario government followed suit with a Ministry of the Environment in 1972.

Jack McGinnis of Toronto helped form a community-based non-profit organization called "Is Five" Foundation in 1974. Named for a book of poetry by e.e. cummings, Is Five organized Canada's first multi-material curbside pickup of recyclable material for 80,000 households of The Beaches neighbourhood of east Toronto. In 1977, Jack McGinnis and Derek Stephenson created a private consulting company, Resource Integration Systems (RIS) to advise governments in the field of recycling and waste management.

That same year, in response to the 1973 energy crisis, Rick Findlay was hired by Environment Canada's Federal Facilities Program to develop and coordinate a resource conservation program primarily for federal government facilities in Ontario. The program was expected to improve environmental quality and reduce energy demand. The Federal Facilities Program sought advice on a recycling pilot program for Canadian Forces Base Borden and eventually made contact with RIS. RIS experimented with a variety of techniques to improve the performance recycling and found that participation rates were significantly higher when residents could simply drop their recycling in a plastic box. Initially, the project at CFB Borden used milk crates borrowed from a local grocery store. Participation was likely encouraged by a standing order from the Base Commander to recycle.

Meanwhile, a student and a volunteer at a Kitchener/Waterloo, Ontario office of Pollution Probe, Eric Hellman organized "Garbage Fest 77" in Kitchener to raise awareness about the consequences of garbage production. McGinnis was invited to speak about his experiences with the CFB Borden program. Hellman also requested a representative from Superior Sanitation (later to be Laidlaw Waste Systems Ltd), the local garbage collection contractor, and an employee named Nyle Ludolph attended Garbage Fest. After meeting McGinnis at the festival, Ludolph became an enthusiastic recycler at his own home and helped increase Laidlaw's presence in recycling. Nyle managed "Total Recycling Systems", a subsidiary of Superior Sanitation/Laidlaw.

In 1978, Jack McGinnis and Eric Hellman and others met in the basement of the Trinity United Church on Yonge Street in Toronto and created the Recycling Council of Ontario.

=== Implementation ===
In 1981, after close cooperation with Nyle Ludolph, RIS submitted a proposal to Laidlaw to collect and recycle materials at the curbside for a pilot project in Kitchener, Ontario. Lillian and Ken Croal of Kitchener were the first to use and receive a blue box. RIS designed the program, and Total Recycling had the responsibility to handle all operations. The Kitchener project included 1,500 households and was tested with four different approaches to recycling:

- Curbside pick-up without providing blue boxes;
- Curbside pick-up with blue boxes;
- Curbside pick-up with blue boxes, including knocking on doors to inform residents; and,
- Composting with composters provided by Laidlaw, free of charge.

The blue box recycling system was proposed to be included as an included "extra" to the regular waste management contract. Laidlaw was successful in obtaining the waste management contract for Kitchener, and the blue box system had its commercial launch. RIS came up with the slogan "We Recycle", which was applied to every box that went out in Kitchener. Various reasons why the boxes were coloured blue, as opposed to some other colour have been posited: the facts are that RIS felt they looked best and were most visible in blue. It was also a colour that was suitable in terms of withstanding damage from ultraviolet light.

The four recycling approaches were monitored by RIS for one year and the blue box was decided as the most effective. The "test project" continued to run however, and people who did not have the blue boxes began requesting them. Laidlaw received many letters from residents expressing support for the program and for it to continue. The blue box program was implemented citywide in 1983, with Laidlaw providing the extra investment in additional boxes and trucks and handling equipment even though it was not required by their waste management contract with the City. Participation rates ran at 85 percent, and the program was regarded as a success.

In 1984 the Citywide contract for Kitchener went out to public bid, as previously scheduled. City staff simply followed previous procedures – i.e., no specific requirement to offer recycling services was included in bid documents. Laidlaw chose to submit a bid that included continuation of the blue box service while their competitors, mainly large US-based firms, did not. One such competitor submitted a bid that was about $400,000 lower than the one from Laidlaw. The Council meeting where the decision was made was filled with local citizens, especially students, asking their City to support the blue box. The City did, voting to take the blue box bid, not the low bid.

In 1985, Laidlaw won the bid for recycling in the City of Mississauga and introduced the second commercial blue box program in Ontario in June 1986, the largest recycling effort in North America.

Between 1997 and 1999, Laidlaw, Inc. exited the solid waste business after incurring heavy losses through its investments in Safety-Kleen and Greyhound Lines. After almost 20 years of expansion, Laidlaw Inc. filed for protection under Chapter 11 of the U.S. Bankruptcy Code in June 2001.

Currently in Ontario, Canada industry compensates municipalities for approximately 50% of the net costs to operate the blue box program.

The blue box system and variations of it remain in place in hundreds of cities around the world.
