= Khabibullo Abdussamatov =

Russian astrophysicist (born 1940)

Habibullo Ismailovich Abdussamatov
- Хабибулло Исмаилович Абдусаматов
- Born: October 27, 1940 (age 85); Samarkand, Uzbek SSR, Soviet Union
- Education: Samarkand State University; Leningrad State University; Pulkovo Observatory
- Known for: Physics of the Sun; Global warming denial
- Scientific career
- Fields: Astrophysics
- Workplaces: Pulkovo Observatory

Habibullo Ismailovich Abdussamatov (Russian: Хабибулло Исмаилович Абдусаматов; occasionally spelled, Abdusamatov; with initials transliterated either H.I. or K.I; born October 27, 1940) is a Russian astrophysicist. He is the supervisor of the Astrometria project of the Russian section of the International Space Station and the head of Space research laboratory at the Saint Petersburg-based Pulkovo Observatory of the Russian Academy of Sciences. He believes that global warming is primarily caused by natural processes.

== Career ==
Abdussamatov has worked at the Pulkovo Observatory since 1964, as a researcher trainee, postgraduate, junior researcher, senior researcher, leading researcher, and then head of the Space Research Laboratory. He became head of the Space Research Sector of the Pulkovo Observatory and head of the Selenometria project on the Russian segment of the International Space Station.

== Climate views and predictions ==
=== Solar variation ===
Abdussamatov presented papers at the fourth and ninth International Conference on Climate Change, events sponsored by the Heartland Institute and, according to the organiser, bringing together "think tank cosponsors and [...] scientists who dispute the claim that the science is settled". Abdussamatov claims that "global warming results not from the emission of greenhouse gases into the atmosphere, but from an unusually high level of solar radiation and a lengthy—almost throughout the last century—growth in its intensity." This view contradicts the scientific consensus on climate change. He has asserted that "parallel global warmings—observed simultaneously on Mars and on Earth—can only be a straightline consequence of the effect of the one same factor: a long-time change in solar irradiance." This claim has not been accepted by the broader scientific community. Some other scientists have stated that "the idea just isn't supported by the theory or by the observations" and that it "doesn't make physical sense."

Abdussamatov holds that Earth's atmosphere does not produce a greenhouse effect, stating "Ascribing 'greenhouse' effect properties to the Earth's atmosphere is not scientifically substantiated." He further states that "Heated greenhouse gases, which become lighter as a result of expansion, ascend to the atmosphere only to give the absorbed heat away."

=== 21st Century Mini-Ice Age ===
In early 2012, Abdussamatov predicted the onset of a new "mini-ice age" commencing 2014 and becoming most severe around 2055. His prediction gained traction in the press after the harsh 2013/2014 winter, despite the fact that winter was only harsh in eastern North America. In 2012 Abdussamatov quantified declining trend Total Solar Irradiance (TSI) and predicts further bicentennial based declining TSI.

== Selected publications ==
- Abdussamatov, H. I. (2004). "Space solar limbograph". In Corbett, Ian F. (ed.). Multi-Wavelength Investigations of Solar Activity. Vol. 2004. Cambridge University Press. pp. 605–606. doi:10.1017/S1743921304006969. S2CID 177411496.
- Abdussamatov, H. I. (2006). "Space-based solar limbograph". Journal of Optical Technology. 73 (4): 242–244. Bibcode:2006JOptT..73..242A. doi:10.1364/JOT.73.000242.
- Abdussamatov, Habibullo I. (February 2012). "Bicentennial Decrease of the Total Solar Irradiance Leads to Unbalanced Thermal Budget of the Earth and the Little Ice Age". Applied Physics Research. 4 (1): 178–184. doi:10.5539/apr.v4n1p178. ISSN 1916-9639.
