= Pollution Probe =

- Founded: 1969
- Type: Non-Profit
- Registration no.: 10809 2701 RR0001
- Location(s): 130 Queens Quay East, Suite 902 West Tower Toronto, ON M5A 0P6 Canada
- Key people: Christopher Hilkene (CEO); Sean Morley (Board Chair)
- Website: www.pollutionprobe.org

Pollution Probe (also known as The Pollution Probe Foundation) is one of the first environmental non-governmental organizations (ENGOs) in Canada. Pollution Probe is a nonprofit group that seeks to improve Canadian's health through research, education, promotion and advocacy of actions to reduce pollution.

== History ==
Pollution Probe was founded in 1969 by a group of students and faculty at the University of Toronto out of a desire to address environmental issues. The group initially focused on air pollution and only the Ontario area, but gradually expanded to also focus upon other forms of environmental pollution over time, and also nationwide concerns.

According to the organization's history, they worked on getting restrictions on the use of DDT enacted in 1969, and later a ban throughout Canada. In 1970, they pushed for legislation to limit phosphates in detergents. In 1973, they helped initiate recycling programs in Ontario, and in 1979 they helped push for legislation to restrict emissions that cause acid rain. In 1980, they opened Ecology House, an environmental education centre and urban demonstration of local self-reliance. In 1988, they helped to get regulations passed to remove lead from gasoline, and in 1993, they launched an annual "Clean Air Commute" campaign to increase public awareness about transportation options that could help improve air quality, and by 1998 they achieved the passage of mandatory vehicle emission testing in Ontario. In 2004, Pollution Probe helped to obtain further regulations in Ontario to reduce metal smelter facility emissions that can cause acid rain. In 2010, the organization helped to persuade the legislature to enact regulations to limit car and truck greenhouse gas emissions. In 2013, the organization collaborated with five power utilities to launch the Electric Mobility Adoption and Prediction ("EMAP") project.

In 2016, Pollution Probe and Plug'n Drive issued a report with recommendations intended to increase sales and use of electric vehicles. In 2017, Pollution Probe was appointed to one of the positions on an advisory group for developing a plan for getting more zero-emission vehicles in use.

In 2019, Pollution Probe partnered with the Royal Bank of Canada to produce a report on watershed planning in the Great Lakes ecosystem. The report used data science to analysis the ecosystem's functions and determine future actions to improve its health.

== Ratings ==
Pollution Probe has a "B" grade according to Charity Intelligence Canada, and in fiscal year 2015 the organization spent 12% of revenues on administrative costs, and total overhead costs of 46%.

== Award received ==
In 1970, Pollution Probe received the White Owl Conservation Award for raising public awareness of the problem of phosphates in detergents and for being a key player in getting Ontario to ban the insecticide DDT.

== Related ==
In 2016, The First Green Wave, a book about the beginning of the environmental movement in Ontario, authored by Ryan O'Connor, won the Ontario Historical Society's J.J. Talman Award for being the best book on Ontario's social, economic, political or cultural history, published in the past three years. The book focused heavily upon the history of Pollution Probe.
