= List of wind farms in Canada =

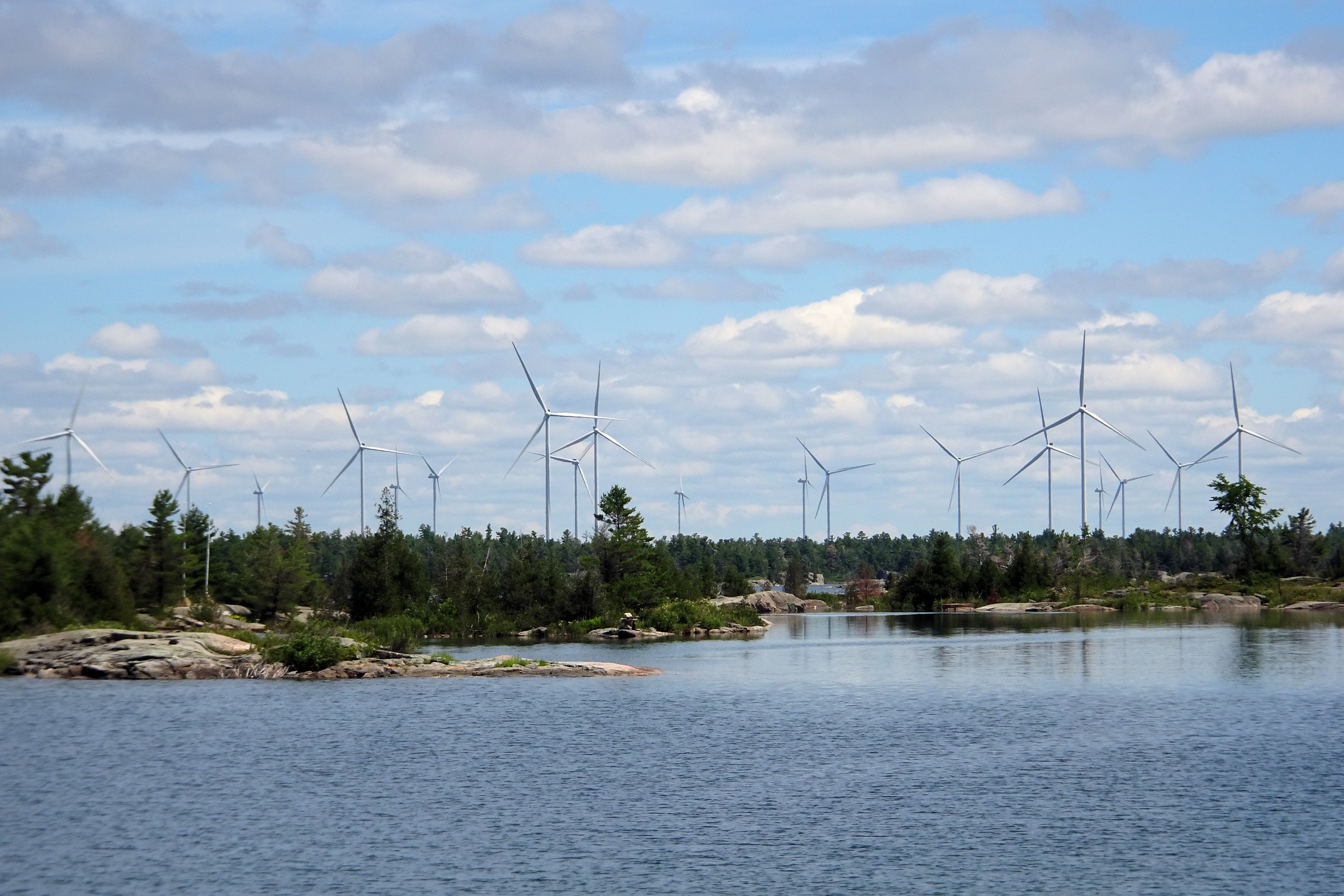
Henvey Inlet, the largest wind farm in Ontario and the third largest in Canada

This is a list of the ten largest operational wind farms in Canada. The name of the wind farm is the name used by the energy company when referring to the farm.

The Centennial Wind Power Facility in Saskatchewan was the first wind farm in Canada to have a capacity of at least 100 MW upon completion in 2006. Since then numerous other wind farms have surpassed the 100 MW threshold, most often through the expansion of existing wind farms. All but two of Canada's provinces or territories are home to at least one wind farm, those without being Nunavut and the Northwest Territories.

== Largest wind farms ==
Buffalo Plains is a 466 MW wind farm and is currently the largest wind farm in Alberta. Located west of Lomond, Alberta. It consists of 83 Siemens turbines. This asset is owned by Copenhagen Infrastructure Partners.

The previous record-holder was the 363.5 MW Seigneurie de Beaupré Wind Farms in Quebec since it was last expanded in October 2015 from 340 MW to 363.5 MW.

Ten largest wind farms in Canada
Rank	Name	Province	Coordinates	Capacity (MW)	Year	Owner	Ref
1	Buffalo Plains Wind Farm (BPW1)	Alberta	Lomond	466	2024	Copenhagen Infrastructure Partners	
2	Seigneurie de Beaupré	Quebec	47°22′20″N 70°51′39″W	363.5	2013	Boralex, Gaz Métro, La Côte-de-Beaupré	
3	Rivière-du-Moulin	Quebec	47°58′14″N 71°01′07″W	350	2014	EDF Renewables	
4	Blackspring Ridge	Alberta	50°08′03″N 112°54′55″W	300	2014	EDF Renewables, Enbridge	
5	Henvey Inlet	Ontario	45°58′35″N 80°33′38″W	300	2019	Pattern Energy, Nigig Power	
6	Lac Alfred	Quebec	48°24′51″N 67°41′15″W	300	2013	EDF Renewables, Enbridge	
7	Sharp Hill Wind (SHH1)	Alberta	Special Areas 4	297	2023	EDP Renewables	
8	South Kent Wind Farm	Ontario	42°17′48″N 82°16′12″W	270	2014	Pattern Energy, Samsung	
9	K2 Wind Power Facility	Ontario	43°53′46″N 81°37′20″W	270	2015	Axium Infrastructure	
10	Forty Mile Bow Island (FRM1)	Alberta	Forty Mile	266	2024	RES	

== By province or territory ==
Listed below is every wind farm in Canada with at least two wind turbines and a capacity of at least 0.1 MW.

=== Alberta ===
List of wind farms in Alberta.

Name (AESO ID)	Location	Capacity (MW)	Year	Owner	Status	Ref
Ardenville Wind (ARD1)	Fort Macleod	68	2010	TransAlta	Operational	
Blackspring Ridge Wind Project (BSR1)	Carmangay	300	2013	EDF Renewables/Enbridge	Operational	
Blue Trail Wind (BTR1)	Fort Macleod	66	2009	TransAlta	Operational	
Buffalo Atlee (BFL1, BFL2, BFL3, BFL4)	Jenner	72	2023	Capstone Infrastructure	Operational	
Buffalo Plains Wind Farm (BPW1)	Lomond	466	2024	Copenhagen Infrastructure Partners	Operational	
Bull Creek Wind Facility (BUL1 BUL2)	Chauvin	29	2015	BluEarth Renewables	Operational	
Castle River (CR1)	Pincher Creek	44	2000–2001	TransAlta	Operational	
Castle Rock Ridge 2 (CRR2)	Pincher Creek	29	2019	Enel Green Power	Operational	
Castle Rock Ridge Wind Farm (CRR1)	Pincher Creek	77	2012	Enel Green Power	Operational	
Suncor Chin Chute (SCR3)	Taber	30	2006	Acciona, Enbridge, Suncor Energy	Operational	
Cowley North (CRE3)	Cowley	20	2001	TransAlta	Operational	
Cypress 1 (CYP1)	Dunmore	196	2022	Cypress Renewable Energy Centre Limited Partnership	Operational	
Cypress 2 (CYP2)	Dunmore	46	2022	Cypress 2 Renewable Energy Centre Limited Partnership	Operational	
Forty Mile Bow Island (FRM1)	Forty Mile	266	2024	RES	Operational	
Forty Mile Granlea (FMG1)	Bow Island	200	2022	Suncor Energy Inc.	Operational	
Garden Plain (GDP1)	Paintearth County No. 18	130	2022	TransAlta	Operational	
Ghost Pine (NEP1)	Kneehill County	82	2010	NextEra Energy	Operational	
Grizzly Bear Creek (GRZ1)	Minburn County No. 27	152	2022	Enel Green Power	Operational	
Halkirk Wind Power Facility (HAL1)	Halkirk	150	2012	Capital Power Corporation	Operational	
Halkirk Wind Project Phase 2 (HAL2)	Paintearth County No. 18	126	2024	CapitalPower	Operational	
Hand Hills (HHW1)	Starland County	145	2022	Blue Earth Renewables	Operational	
Hilda Wind (HLD1)	Cypress County	100	2022	Renewable Energy Systems Canada	Operational	
Jenner 1 (JNR1)	Special Area No. 2	122	2023	Potentia Renewables	Operational	
Jenner 2 (JNR2)	Special Area No. 2	71	2023	Potentia Renewables	Operational	
Jenner 3 (JNR3)	Special Area No. 2	109	2023	Potentia Renewables	Operational	
Kettles Hill (KHW1)	Pincher Creek	63	2008	Enmax	Operational	
Lanfine Wind (LAN1)	Special Area No. 3	151	2022	Pattern Energy	Operational	
Suncor Magrath (SCR2)	Magrath	30	2004	Acciona, Enbridge, Suncor Energy	Operational	
McBride Lake Windfarm (AKE1)	Fort Macleod	73	2003	Enmax, TransAlta	Operational	
Oldman 2 Wind Farm 1 (OWF1)	Pincher Creek	46	2014	IKEA	Operational	
Oldman River Wind Project (Not Listed)	Pincher Creek	3.6	2007	Alberta Wind Energy Corporation	Operational	
Paintearth Wind Project (PAW1)	Castor	198	2023	Potentia Renewables	Operational	
Rattlesnake Ridge Wind (RTL1)	Medicine Hat	130	2022	BHE Canada	Operational	
Riverview (RIV1)	Pincher Creek	105	2019	Enel Green Power	Operational	
Sharp Hill Wind (SHH1)	Special Areas 4	297	2023	EDP Renewables	Operational	
Sinnott (Not Listed)	Cowley	7	2001	TransAlta	Operational	
Soderglen Wind (GWW1)	Fort Macleod	71	2006	Nexen, TransAlta	Operational	
Stirling Wind (SWP1)	Stirling	113	2023	Potentia Renewables	Operational	
Summerview 1 (IEW1)	Pincher Creek	66	2004	TransAlta	Operational	
Summerview 2 (IEW2)	Pincher Creek	66	2010	TransAlta	Operational	
Enmax Taber (TAB1)	Taber	81	2007	Enmax	Operational	
Wheatland Wind (WHE1)	Drumheller	120	2022	Potentia Renewables	Operational	
Whitla 1 (WHT1)	Forty Mile County	202	2019	Capital Power Corporation	Operational	
Whitla 2 (WHT2)	Forty Mile County	151	2021	Capital Power Corporation	Operational	
Wild Rose (WIR1)	Cypress County	192	2024	Capstone Infrastructure	Operational	
Windrise (WRW1)	Willow Creek	207	2021	TransAlta	Operational	
Winnifred Wind Project (WIN1)	Forty Mile	136	2024	Enerfin Energy	Operational	
Wintering Hills (SCR4)	Drumheller	88	2011	IKEA	Operational	
Total		5688				

List of decommissioned wind farms in Alberta
Name	Location	Capacity (MW)	Startup	Decommissioned	Owner	Status	Ref
Cowley Ridge	Pincher Creek	20	1993	2016	TransAlta	Decommissioned	
Taylor	Magrath	3	2004		TransAlta	Decommissioned	

=== British Columbia ===
List of wind farms in British Columbia.

Name	Location	Capacity (MW)	Year	Owner	Status	Ref
Bear Mountain Wind Park	55°42′N 120°26′W	102	2009	AltaGas	Operational	
Cape Scott Wind Farm	Port Hardy	99	2013	GDF-Suez	Operational	
Dokie Ridge Wind Farm	55°42′00″N 122°17′00″W	144	2011	Alterra Power	Operational	
The Eye of the Wind	49°23′14″N 123°04′33″W	1.5	2010	Grouse Mountain Resort	Operational	
Meikle Wind Farm	Peace Region	184.6	2016	Pattern Development	Operational	
Pennask Wind Farm	49°55′26″N 120°6′14″W	15	2017	Okanagan Wind	Operational	
Quality Wind Project	Tumbler Ridge	142.2	2012	Capital Power Corporation	Operational	
Shinish Creek Wind Farm	49°39′39″N 120°8′13″W	15	2017	Okanagan Wind	Operational	
Total		703.3				

=== Manitoba ===
List of all wind farms in Manitoba.

Name	Location	Capacity (MW)	Year	Owner	Status	Ref
St. Joseph Wind Farm	49°18′54″N 97°44′38″W	138	2011	Pattern Energy	Operational	
St. Leon Wind Farm	49°21′37″N 98°32′15″W	120	2006/2011	Algonquin Power	Operational	

=== Newfoundland and Labrador ===
List of wind farms in Newfoundland and Labrador.

Name	Location	Capacity (MW)	Year	Owner	Status	Ref
Fermeuse Wind Project	Fermeuse	27	2009	Elemental Power	Operational	
Ramea Wind-Hydrogen-Diesel Energy Project	Ramea	0.39	2004	NL Hydro	Operational	
St. Lawrence Wind Project	St. Lawrence	27	2008	NeWind Group Inc.	Operational	
Total		54.3				

=== New Brunswick ===
List of all wind farms in New Brunswick.

Name	Location	Capacity (MW)	Year	Owner	Status	Ref
Caribou Wind Park	70 km west of Bathurst	99	2009	Suez Renewable Energy	Operational	
Kent Hills	45°48′20″N 64°53′45″W	167	2008-2018	TransAlta	Operational	
Lameque	Acadian Peninsula	45	2011	Acciona Energy	Operational	
Wisokolamson	Riverside-Albert	18	2019	SWEB Development	Operational	
Burchill Wind Project	Lorneville, NB	42	2019	Natural Forces	Operational	
Total		329				

=== Nova Scotia ===
List of wind farms in Nova Scotia.

Name	Location	Capacity (MW)	Year	Owner	Status	Ref
Amherst	Amherst Nova Scotia	31.5	2011	Capstone Infrastructure	Operational	
Brookfield		0.6	2005	Renewable Energy Services Limited	Operational	
Dalhousie Mountain Wind Farm	Mount Thom	51	2009	RMS Energy	Operational	
Digby Limited		0.8	2006	Renewable Energy Services Limited	Operational	
Ellershouse	Hants County	23.15	2015-17	Alternative Resource Energy Authority	Operational	
Fitzpatrick Mountain		1.6	2006	Capstone Infrastructure	Operational	
Glace Bay / Lingan Power Project	Lingan	17.5		Capstone Infrastructure	Operational	
Glen Dhu Wind Farm	Merigomish	62.1	2011	Capstone Infrastructure	Operational	
Goodwood		0.6	2005	Renewable Energy Services Limited	Operational	
Grand Etang		0.66	2002	Nova Scotia Power	Operational	
Higgins Mountain Riverhurst		3.6	2006	Vector Wind Energy/Spring Hill	Operational	
Littlebrook		0.6	2002	Nova Scotia Power	Operational	
Marshville Limited	Marshville	0.8	2006	Renewable Energy Services	Operational	
Maryvale Wind Project		6.0	2010	Maryvale Wind LP	Operational	
Nuttby Wind Farm	Nuttby Mountain	50.6	2010	Nova Scotia Limited	Operational	
Point Tupper Wind Farm		22.50	2010	Renewable Energy Services Ltd, Nova Scotia Power	Operational	
Pubnico Point	Pubnico-Ouest	30.6	2005	NextEra	Operational	
South Canoe Wind Energy Project	Lunenburg County	102	2015	Minas Basin Pulp and Power	Operational	
Springhill Project		1.3	2005	Vector Wind Energy	Operational	
Springhill Riverhurst		0.9	2006	Vector Wind Energy/Springhill	Operational	
Tiverton Riverhurst		0.9	2006	Vector Wind Energy/Springhill	Operational	
Watts Wind Project		1.5	2011	Watts Wind Energy	Operational	
Black Pond	Yarmouth	1.99	2015	SWEB Development	Operational	
Brenton	Yarmouth	1.99	2016	SWEB Development	Operational	
Parker Mountain	Granville Ferry	1.99	2014	SWEB Development	Operational	
Martock Ridge	Windsor	6.0	2015	SWEB Development	Operational	
Walton	East Hants	1.99	2016	SWEB Development	Operational	
North Beaver Bank	Halifax	8.0	2015	SWEB Development	Operational	
Nine Mile River	Nine Mile River	4.0	2015	SWEB Development	Operational	
Hardwood Lands	Nine Mile River	6.0	2016	SWEB Development	Operational	
Isle Madame	Cape Breton Island	1.99	2015	SWEB Development	Operational	
Saint Rose	Cape Breton Island	1.99	2014	SWEB Development	Operational	
Baddeck	Baddeck	1.7	2016	SWEB Development	Operational	
Total		417.31				

=== Ontario ===
List of all wind farms in Ontario.

Name	Location	Capacity (MW)	Year	Owner	Status	Ref
Adelaide Wind Power Project	Middlesex County	40	2015	Suncor Energy	Operational	
Adelaide Wind Energy Centre	Middlesex County	60	2014	NextEra Energy	Operational	
Amaranth Wind Farm	44°06′00″N 80°16′15″W	199.5	2008	TransAlta	Operational	
Amherst Island Wind Farm	Amherst Island	75	2018	Windletric	Operational	
Armow Wind	Grey County	180	2015	Pattern Energy	Operational	
Belle River Wind Farm	Lakeshore	100	2017	Pattern Energy	Operational	
Bornish Wind Energy Centre	Middlesex County	72.9	2014	NextEra Energy Canada	Operational	
Bow Lake Wind Project	Sault Ste. Marie	58.32	2015	BluEarth Renewables	Operational	
Cedar Point Wind Power Project	Lambton County	99.96	2015	NextEra Energy Canada / Suncor Energy	Operational	
Chatham Wind Farm	42°14′N 82°24′W	101.2	2010	Kruger Energy	Operational	
Clear Creek Point Wind Farm	Norfolk County	9.9	2008	International Power	Operational	
Comber Wind Farm	Essex County	165.6	2012	Brookfield Renewable Power	Operational	
Conestogo Wind Energy Centre I	Conestogo	22.9	2012	NextEra Energy	Operational	
Cruickshank Wind Farm	Kincardine	8.25	2008	Enbridge	Operational	
Cultus Wind Farm	Norfolk County	9.9	2008	International Power	Operational	
Dufferin Wind Farm	Melancthon	91.4	2013	Longyuan Canada Renewables Ltd.	Operational	
ExPlace Wind Turbine	43°37′49.5″N 79°25′29.3″W	0.6	2002	WindShare and Toronto Hydro	Operational	
Ferndale Wind Farm	Ferndale	5.1	2002	Sky Generation	Operational	
Frogmore Wind Farm	Norfolk County	9.9	2008	International Power	Operational	
Ganaraska Wind Farm	Clarington	17.60	2016	Capstone Infrastructure	Operational	
Gosfield Wind Farm	Kingsville	51	2011	Brookfield Renewable Partners	Operational	
Greenwich Wind Farm	Dorion, Ontario	99	2012	RES Canada	Operational	
Gunn's Hill Wind Farm	Norwich, Ontario	18.0	2016	OCEC/Prowind/Six Nations	Operational	
Harrow Wind Farm	Essex	39.6	2010	International Power	Operational	
Henvey Inlet	45°58′34.6″N 80°33′38.3″W	300	2019	Pattern Energy	Operational	
Huron Wind	44°18′58″N 81°32′55″W	9	2002	Cameco, OMERS, TransCanada	Operational	
Kingsbridge	Goderich	39.6	2006	Capital Power Corporation	Operational	
McLean's Mountain Wind Farm	Manitoulin Island	60	2014	Northland Power	Operational	
Mohawk Point Wind Farm	Norfolk County	9.9	2008	International Power	Operational	
Napier Wind Farm	Adelaide Metcalfe	4.1	2015	WPD	Operational	
Niagara Region Wind Farm	Regional Municipality of Niagara	230	2016	Boralex	Operational	
North Kent Wind Farm	Chatham-Kent	100	2018	Pattern Energy	Operational	
OPG 7 commemorative turbine	43°48′44″N 79°04′26″W	1.8	2001	Ontario Power Generation	Decommissioned	
Pointe-Aux-Roche Wind Facility	Lakeshore, Ontario	48.6	2011	Engie	Operational	
Port Alma Wind Farm	42°14′N 82°24′W	101.2	2008	Kruger Energy	Operational	
Port Burwell (Erie Shores)	42°37′N 80°40′W	99	2006	Macquarie Power & Infrastructure	Operational	
Port Dover and Nanticoke	Port Dover	105	2013	Capital Power Corporation	Operational	
Port Ryerse Wind Farm	Smithville	10	2016	Boralex	Operational	
Prince	46°37′00″N 84°28′45″W	189	2006	Brookfield Renewable Power	Operational	
Proof Line Wind Farm	Lambton Shores	6.6	2009	Sky Generation	Operational	
Providence Bay Wind Farm	Providence Bay	1.6	2007	Schneider Power	Operational	
Raleigh Wind Energy Centre	Raleigh	78	2011	TerraForm Power	Operational	
Ravenswood Wind Farm	Lambton Shores	9.9	2008	Sky Generation	Operational	
Ripley	Huron-Kinloss	76	2007	Acciona, Suncor Energy	Operational	
Romney Wind Energy Centre	Chatham-Kent	60	2019	EDF Renewables	Operational	
Snowy Ridge Wind Farm	Kawartha Lakes	10	2016	Capstone Projects	Operational	
South Branch Wind Farm	South Dundas	30	2014	EDP Renewables	Operational	
Springwood Wind Farm	Centre Wellington	8.2	2014	WPD	Operational	
Springwood Wind Farm	Centre Wellington	8.2	2014	WPD	Operational	
Sumac Ridge Wind Project	Kawartha Lakes	10.25	2017	WPD	Operational	
Summerhaven Wind Energy Centre	Haldimand County	125	2013	NextEra Energy Canada	Operational	
Talbot Wind Farm	Chatham-Kent	98.9	2011	Enbridge and RES Canada	Operational	
Thames River I	Chatham-Kent	40	2010	Boralex	Operational	
Thames River II	Chatham-Kent	50	2010	Boralex	Operational	
Underwood Wind Farm	44°20′20″N 81°27′32″W	181.5	2009	Enbridge	Operational	
Whittington Wind Project	Amaranth, Ontario	6.15	2014	WPD	Operational	
Wolfe Island Wind Farm	44°10′N 76°28′W	197.8	2009	TransAlta	Operational	
Total		3822.33				

=== Prince Edward Island ===
List of all wind farms in Prince Edward Island.

Name	Location	Capacity (MW)	Year	Owner	Status	Ref
Aeolus Wind	Norway	3	2003	Aeolus Wind PEI	Operational	
Eastern Kings Wind Farm	Elmira/North Lake	30	2007	PEI Energy Corporation	Operational	
East Kings Wind Plant - Phase 2	Elmira	29.4	2024	PEI Energy Corporation	Construction	
Hermanville/Clear Springs Wind Farm	Hermanville	30	2013	PEI Energy Corporation	Operational	
North Cape Wind Farm	North Cape	10.6	2001-2003	PEI Energy Corporation	Operational	
Norway Wind Farm	Norway	9	2007	Suez Renewable Energy	Operational	
Skinners Pond Wind Plant	Skinners Pond	99	2024	Invenergy	Planning	
Summerside Wind Farm	Summerside	12	2009	City of Summerside Electric Utility	Operational	
West Cape Wind Farm	West Cape	99	2007-2009	Suez Renewable Energy	Operational	
WEICan R&D Wind Farm	North Cape	10	2013	WEICan	Operational	
Wejipek Wind Project	Middleton/Kinkora	12	2024	Lennox Island	Planning	
Total		332.0				

=== Quebec ===
List of wind farms in Quebec.

Name	Location	Capacity (MW)	Date	Owner	Status	Ref
Baie-des-Sables Wind Farm	48°42′08″N 67°52′21″W	109.5	2006	Cartier Wind Energy	Operational	
Carleton Wind Farm	48°12′10″N 66°07′42″W	109.5	2008	Cartier Wind Energy	Operational	
Gros-Morne	49°12′23″N 65°26′54″W	211.5	2011	Cartier Wind Energy	Operational	
Jardin d'Eole Wind Farm	48°43′37″N 67°37′51″W	127.5	2009	Northland Power	Operational	
L'Anse-à-Valleau Wind Farm	49°05′38″N 64°39′13″W	100.5	2007	Cartier Wind Energy	Operational	
Lac Alfred Wind Project	48°23′21″N 67°45′06″W	300	2013	EDF Énergies Nouvelles / Enbridge	Operational	
Le Nordais (Cap-Chat)	Cap-Chat	57	1998	TransAlta	Operational	
Le Nordais (Matane)	Matane	42.75	1999	TransAlta	Operational	
Le Plateau Wind Farm (Note: A 23 MW expansion is scheduled for 2013.)	48°02′15″N 67°27′58″W	138.6	2012	Invenergy	Operational	
Massif-du-Sud Wind Project	46°34′49″N 70°26′24″W	150	2013	EDF Énergies Nouvelles / Enbridge	Operational	
Mesgi'g Ugju's'n Wind Farm	48°13′05″N 66°42′26″W	149.25	2016	Parc éolien Mesgi'g Ugju's'n (MU) S.E.C	Operational	
Montagne-Sèche	49°10′45″N 64°57′12″W	58.5	2011	Cartier Wind Energy	Operational	
Mont-Louis	49°12′03″N 65°39′26″W	100.5	2011	Northland Power	Operational	
Montérégie Wind Farm	45°17′58″N 73°36′27″W	100	2012	Kruger Inc.	Operational	
Mount Copper	Murdochville	54	2005	NextEra Energy Resources	Operational	
Mount Miller	Murdochville	54	2005	NextEra Energy Resources	Operational	
Rivière-du-Moulin Wind Project	47°58′14″N 71°01′07″W	350	2014	EDF Énergies Nouvelles	Operational	
Saint-Robert-Bellarmin Wind Project	45°41′32″N 70°32′56″W	80	2012	EDF Énergies Nouvelles	Operational	
Seigneurie de Beaupré Wind Farms	47°22′20″N 70°51′39″W	363.5	2013	Boralex / Gaz Métro / La Côte-de-Beaupré	Operational	
Site nordique expérimental en éolien CORUS	Gaspé	4.1	2010	Wind Energy TechnoCentre	Operational	
Total		2660.7				

=== Saskatchewan ===
List of current and planned wind farms in Saskatchewan.

Name	Location	Capacity (MW)	Year	Owner	Status	Ref
Sunbridge	Gull Lake	11	2002	Enbridge, Suncor	Decommissioned	
Cypress Wind Power Facility	Gull Lake	11	2002/2003	SaskPower	Operational	
Centennial Wind Power Facility	Swift Current	150	2006	SaskPower	Operational	
Red Lily Wind Farm	Moosomin	26	2011	Algonquin Power	Operational	
Morse Wind Power Facility	Morse	23	2015	Algonquin Power	Operational	
Western Lily Wind Power Facility	Grenfell	20	2019	Gaia Power	Operational	
Riverhurst Wind Project	Riverhurst	10	2021	Capstone Infrastructure	Operational	
Blue Hill Wind Energy Project	Herbert	177	2022	Algonquin Power	Operational	
Golden South Wind Energy Facility	Assiniboia	200	2022	Potentia Renewables	Operational	
Total		628				

=== Territories ===
The arctic and subarctic climates of northern Canada makes the construction of wind turbines difficult as most are only designed to operate down to a minimum temperature of -30°C (-22°F).

Name	Location	Capacity (MW)	Year	Owner	Status	Notes	Ref
Diavik Diamond Mine	64°29′30″N 110°20′19″W	9.2	2012	RioTinto Diavik Diamond Mine	Operational	Operational to -40C. Since startup through 2018: 26.6 million litres diesel offset; Availability 96%	
Haeckel Hill	60°44′51″N 135°13′34″W	0.40	1993/2000	Yukon Energy Corporation	Operational	Produced 0.81 MW of electricity from 2000 to 2018. Partially decommissioned due to aging infrastructure, now with only one operational wind turbine. Yukon Energy proposes a future expansion of the Haeckel Hill Wind Farm.	
Total		0.40					

== Gallery ==
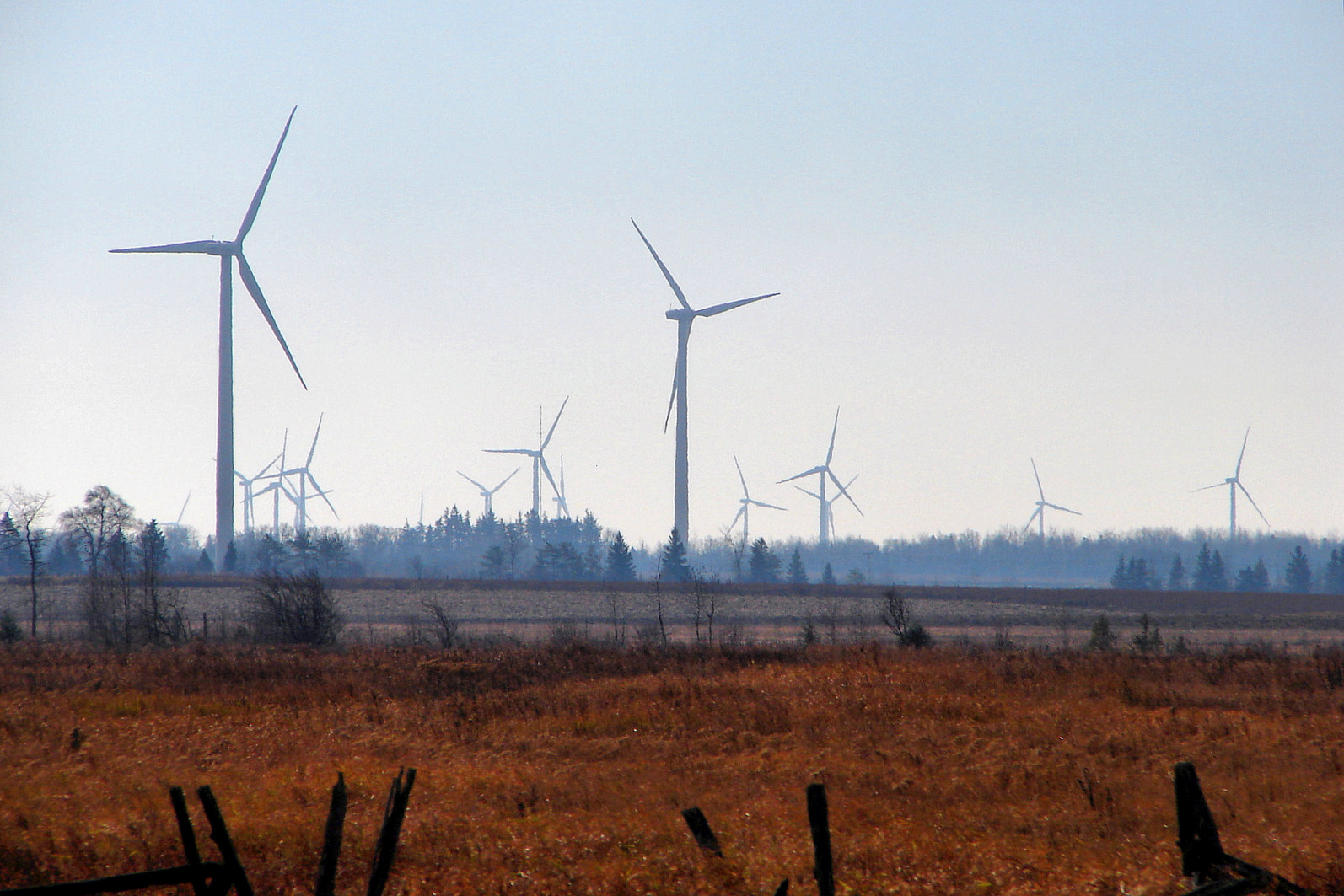
Amaranth Wind Farm

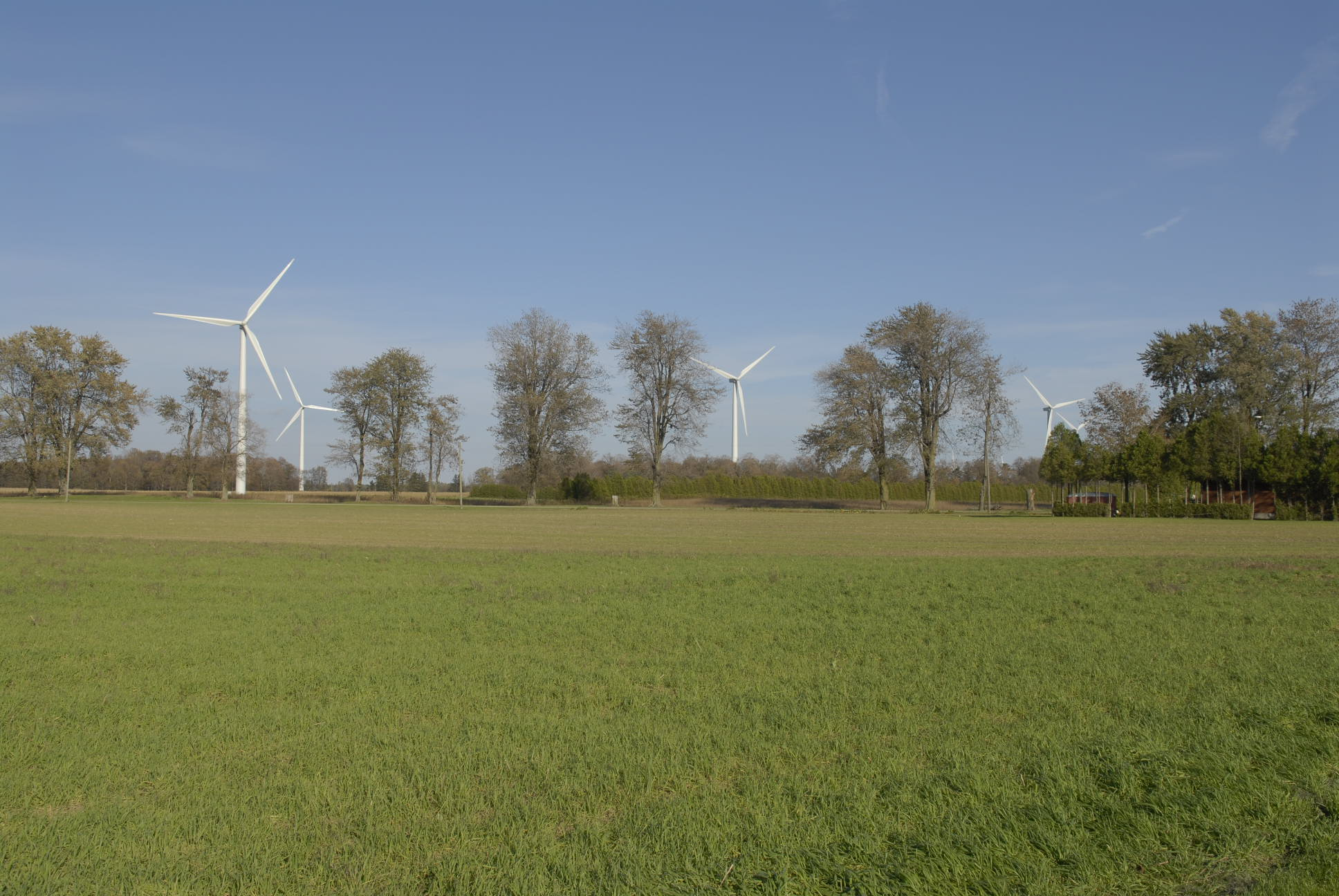
Erie Shores Wind Farm

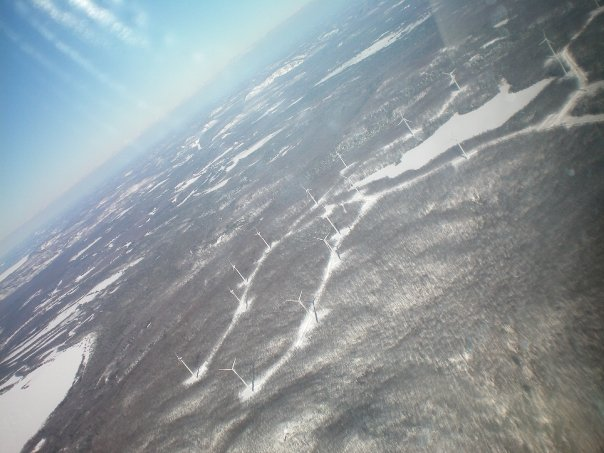
Prince Township Wind Farm from the air

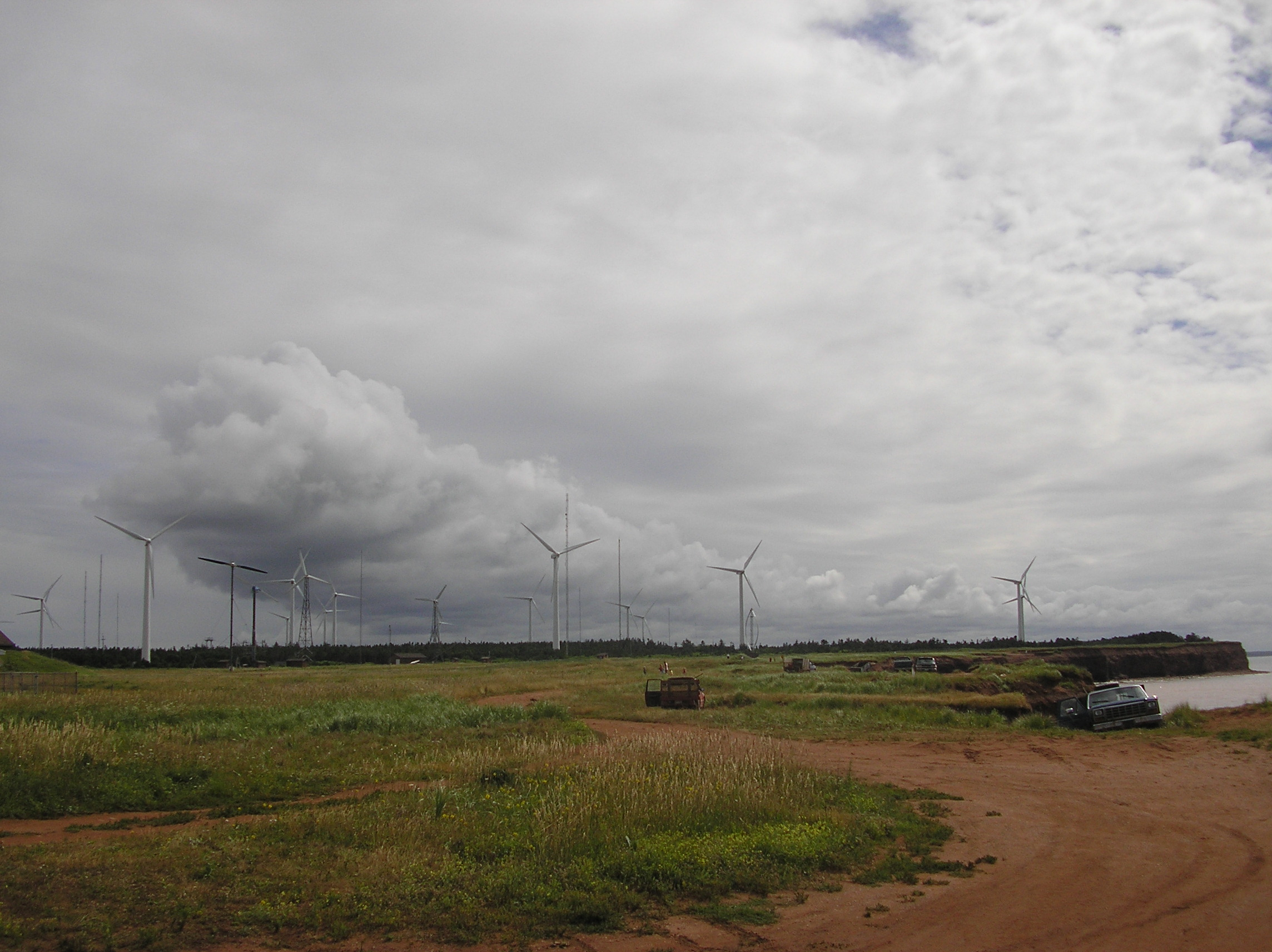
The North Cape wind farm

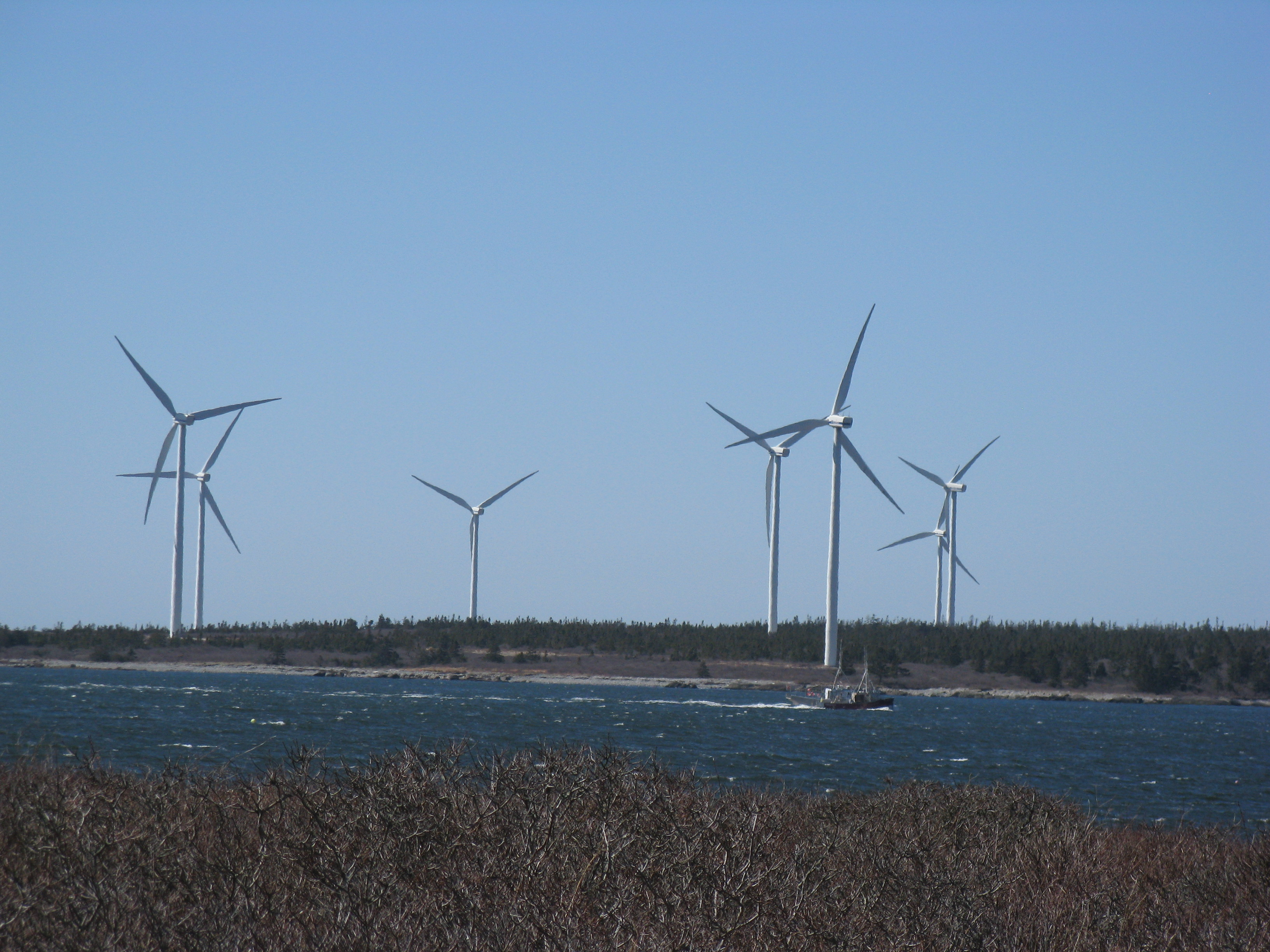
Pubnico Point wind power plant

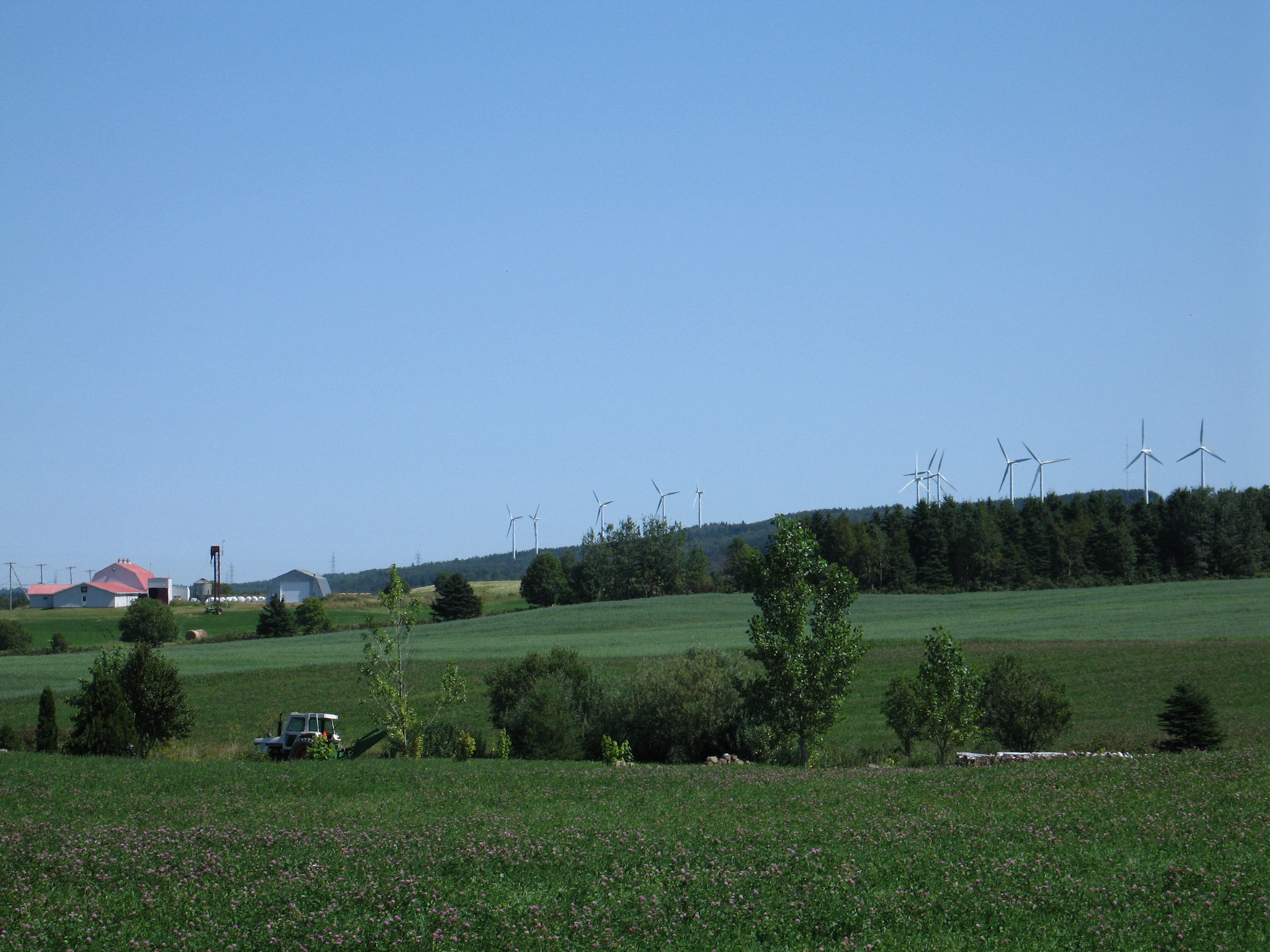
Jardin d'Eole Wind Farm in Saint-Ulric

== See also ==
- Electricity sector in Canada
- Wind power in Canada
- List of environment topics
- List of wind farms
- List of wind farms in the United States
- WindShare

== Notes and references ==
Notes
