= Niagara Region Wind Farm =

Wind farm in the Niagara Region, Ontario

- Country: Canada
- Location: Niagara Region, Ontario
- Coordinates: 42°52′38″N 79°30′19″W
- Status: Operational
- Commission date: 2 November 2016
- Owners: Boralex; Enercon; Six Nations of the Grand River Development Corporation

Power generation
- Units operational: 77 Enercon E‑101
- Nameplate capacity: 230 MW

The Niagara Region Wind Farm is a wind farm located in the Regional Municipality of Niagara, Ontario. The wind farms generates 230 MW of electricity and is the second largest wind farm in Ontario by installed capacity after Henvey Inlet Wind Power Project. It is co-owned by Boralex, Enercon, and the Six Nations of the Grand River Development Corporation.

== See also ==
- List of wind farms in Canada
