= Ste. Sophie landfill =

Landfill in Quebec

Coordinates: 45.7805°N 73.9088°W

The Sainte Sophie landfill is located in Ste. Sophie, Quebec, north of Montreal. Initially operated by Intersan since 1997, it is now operated by Waste Management and collects approximately 850,000 metric tonnes (937,000 tons) of waste annually. The bioreactor landfill is located on a 30-acre (120,000 m^{2}), double-lined corner of the permitted landfill site. Along with the Lachenaie landfill, these two sites collect garbage for the Greater Montreal Area.

The Sainte Sophie landfill consists of 736 acres (2.98 km^{2}) and is approximately 50 km north of Montreal, Quebec. It is located on 2535 1re rue, Ste Sophie, QC J5J 2R7. Its hours are Monday to Friday 4:00 am to 6:00 pm.

The site has a gas-to-energy project with Gaz Metro, Quebec's leading natural gas distributor, and Cascades Inc., one of Canada's largest pulp and paper companies. By using these techniques, waste capacity in a typical landfill can be increased by at least 15 to 30 percent.

In 2003, Waste Management implemented a bioreactor operation at the Sainte Sophie landfill, a method of increasing the moisture content of the landfill waste to speed up decomposition and thus produce gas more quickly. to test its environmental and economic benefits.

In 2005, the Quebec government approved the expansion of the Sainte Sophie landfill to give it an annual capacity of one million tonnes.

== See also ==
- Lachenaie landfill
- External website on the Ste. Sophie landfill
