= Seigneurie de Beaupré Wind Farms =

- Country: Canada
- Location: La Côte-de-Beaupré, Quebec
- Coordinates: 47°22′20″N 70°51′39″W
- Status: Operational
- Commission date: Phase I: 2013; Phase II: 2014; Phase III: 2015
- Owners: Boralex (50%); Gaz Métro (46.8%); La Côte-de-Beaupré (3.2%)

Power generation
- Units operational: 164
- Nameplate capacity: 363.5 MW

External links
- Website: https://www.seigneuriedebeaupre.com/

The Seigneurie de Beaupré Wind Farms, also known as just the Seigneurie de Beaupré, is a wind farm complex located in the La Côte-de-Beaupré Regional County Municipality of Quebec, Canada. The original "Seigneurie 2 & 3" wind farm was developed by Boralex and Gaz Métro in 2013.

== Description ==
Seigneurie de Beaupré is composed of three adjacent wind farms that operate as single unit. Wind farms 2, 3, and 4 are under the co-ownership of Boralex and Gaz Métro while the "Côte-de-Beaupré" wind farm is co-owned by Boralex and the La Côte-de-Beaupré Regional County Municipality. The wind farm complex has undergone multiple expansions, the most recent being the 23.5 MW Phase III expansion completed in 2015.

Wind farm "SBx", a proposed expansion of the Seigneurie de Beaupré wind farm complex, would increase its installed capacity by another 300 MW to 663.5 MW.

Individual wind farms of Seigneurie de Beaupré
Name	Installed capacity (MW)	Units	Owners	Year	Status	Ref
Seigneurie 2 & 3 (Phase I)	272	126	Boralex (50%); Gaz Métro (50%)	2013	Operational	
Seigneurie 4 (Phase II)	68	28	Boralex (50%); Gaz Métro (50%)	2014	Operational	
Côte-de-Beaupré (Phase III)	23.5	10	Boralex (50%); La Côte-de-Beaupré (50%)	2015	Operational	
SBx (Phase IV)	300	?	?	TBD	Proposed	

== See also ==
- List of wind farms in Canada
- List of largest power stations in Canada
