= Gros-Morne Wind Farm =

Wind farm in Quebec, Canada

Gros-Morne
- Country: Canada
- Location: Gaspé Peninsula, Quebec
- Coordinates: 49°20′N 65°44′W
- Status: Operational
- Commission date: Phase I: 2011; Phase II: 2012
- Owner: Cartier Wind Energy

Power generation
- Units operational: 141
- Make and model: GE 1,5 sle
- Nameplate capacity: 211.5MW

The Gros-Morne Wind Farm is a large 211.5 megawatt (MW) wind farm comprising 141 1.5MW wind turbines that provides electricity to over 40,000 homes. It is located about 50 kilometers north-west of Gaspe, Quebec and it is owned and operated by Cartier Wind Energy. The wind farm was constructed in 2 phases, the first phase, involving 100.5 MW and 67 wind turbines, was completed on November 29, 2011. Construction of phase II involved 111MW and 74 wind turbines, and it was finalized on November 6, 2012.

== See also ==
- List of wind farms in Canada
