= Carleton Wind Farm =

Wind farm in Quebec, Canada

- Country: Canada
- Location: Carleton-sur-Mer, Quebec
- Coordinates: 48°06′N 66°08′W
- Status: Operational
- Commission date: 2008
- Owner: Cartier Wind Energy

Power generation
- Units operational: 73
- Make and model: GE 1,5 sle
- Nameplate capacity: 109.5 MW

The Carleton Wind Farm is a 109.5MW wind farm comprising 73 1.5MW wind turbines spread over 5,000 hectares. It began commercial operations in November 2008. It is located near Carleton-sur-Mer, Quebec, and it is owned and operated by Cartier Wind Energy.

== See also ==
- List of wind farms in Canada
