= Gosfield Wind Project =

Wind farm in Ontario, Canada

Coordinates: 42°10′N 82°41′W

The Gosfield Wind Project is a 50.6 megawatt (MW) wind farm in Kingsville, Ontario, consisting of 22 2.3 MW Siemens SWT 2.3 wind turbines with 49 metre long blades. Construction was completed in October 2010 for CDN 149 million.

Production (MWh)
Year	January	February	March	April	May	June	July	August	September	October	November	December	Total
2010								366	7,981	13,713	13,931	15,624	51,615
2011	11,501	18,357	12,737	17,478	11,638	8,211	5,044	5,647	8,689	11,561	20,099	13,595	114,699
2012	19,068	13,560	17,196	13,514	8,051	9,885	6,192						54,838

== See also ==
- List of wind farms in Canada
- List of offshore wind farms
