= Meikle Wind Farm =

- Country: Canada
- Location: Peace River Region, British Columbia
- Coordinates: 55°17′50.5″N 121°24′06.7″W
- Status: Operational
- Construction began: October 2014
- Commission date: January 2017
- Owners: Pattern Energy (50.8%); PSPIB (49.2%)
- Operator: Pattern Energy

Power generation
- Make and model: 61
- Nameplate capacity: 184.6 megawatt (MW)

External links
- Website: https://meiklewind.com

Meikle Wind Farm is a wind farm located in the Peace River region of British Columbia, Canada, between Chetwynd and Tumbler Ridge. The wind farm produces 184.6 MW of electricity and is the largest wind farm in British Columbia. It is co-owned by Pattern Energy and the Public Sector Pension Investment Board.

== See also ==
- List of wind farms in Canada
- Gwillim Lake Provincial Park - a nearby provincial park
