= Anse-à-Valleau Wind Farm =

Wind farm in Gaspé, Quebec, Canada

- Country: Canada
- Location: Gaspé, Quebec
- Coordinates: 49.060°N 64.555°W
- Status: Operational
- Commission date: 10 November 2007
- Owner: Innergex Renewable Energy

The Anse-à-Valleau Wind Farm is a wind farm in Gaspé, Quebec in Canada.

The farm has been in commercial operation since November 10, 2007 and has 67 wind turbines each of 1.5 MW power. The total farm capacity is 100.5 MW.

The turbines were constructed by two Quebec firms, Marmen of Matane, Quebec and LM Wind Power of Gaspé, and it is owned by Innergex Renewable Energy. The electricity produced by the wind farm is sold to Hydro-Québec on the basis of a long term (20-year - 2007–2027) power purchase agreement.

== See also ==
- List of wind farms in Canada
