= Massif du Sud Wind Project =

Coordinates: 46.601389°N 70.458056°W

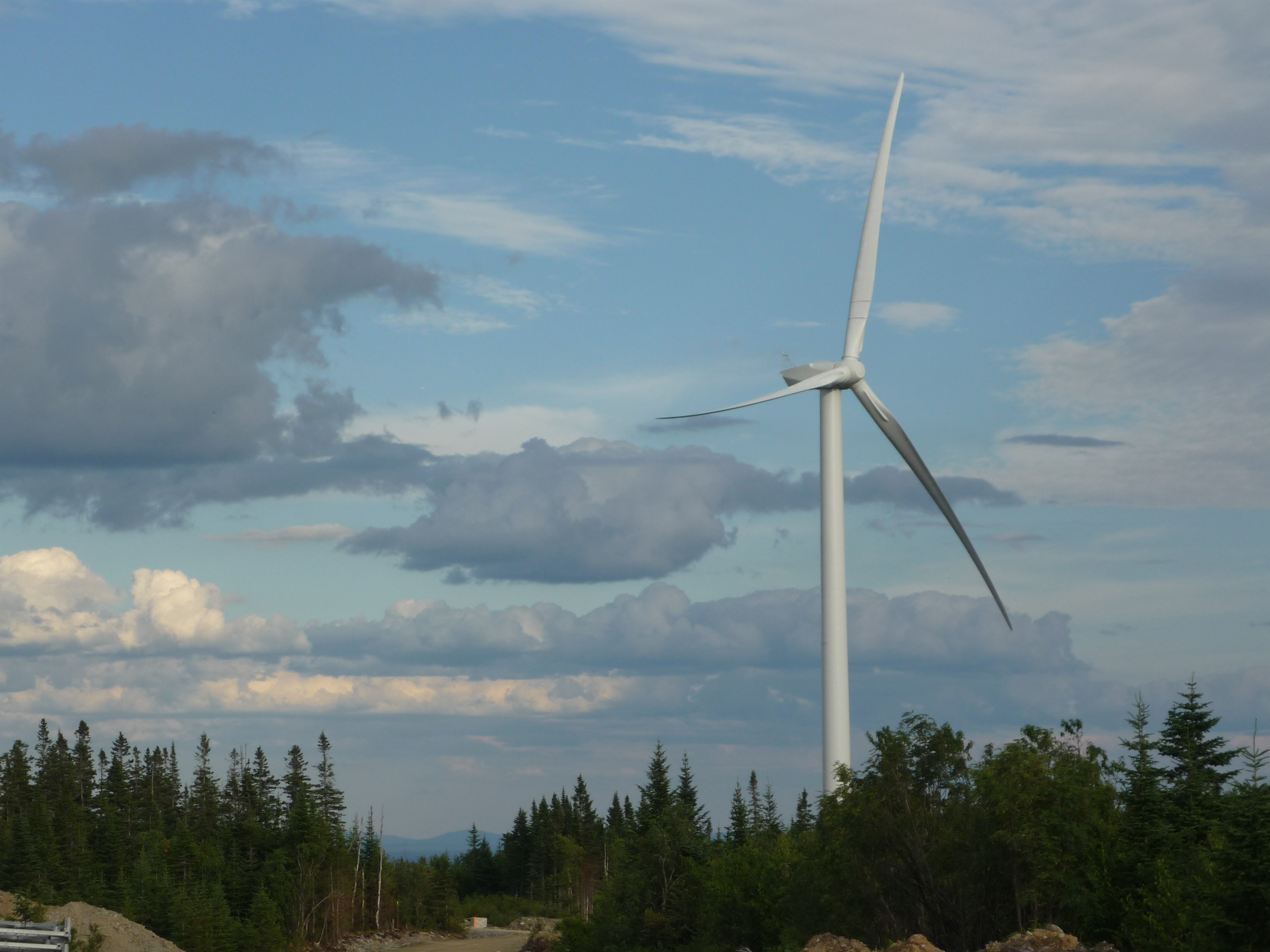
View from Saint-Luc-de-Bellechasse

The Massif du Sud Wind Project is a wind project being developed by EDF Énergies Nouvelles and Enbridge. It is located near the villages of Saint-Philémon, Quebec and Saint-Magloire, Quebec. Comprising 75 REpower Systems 2-megawatt wind turbines, at completion the project will achieve a nameplate capacity of 150 MW.

== See also ==
- List of wind farms in Canada
