= Blackspring Ridge Wind Project =

Wind farm in Alberta, Canada

- Country: Canada
- Location: Vulcan County, Alberta
- Coordinates: 50°08′03″N 112°54′55″W
- Status: Operational
- Construction began: May 2013
- Commission date: May 2014
- Construction cost: C$600 million
- Owners: EDF Renewables (50%); Enbridge (50%)

Wind farm
- Hub height: 80 metres (260 ft)
- Rotor diameter: 100 metres (330 ft)

Power generation
- Units operational: 166 Vestas V100
- Nameplate capacity: 300 MW

The Blackspring Ridge Wind Project is a wind farm located in Vulcan County, Alberta. The wind farms generates 300 MW of electricity and was the largest wind farm in Western Canada by installed capacity, until the completion of the Whitla, Alberta wind farm was expanded to 353MW in December 2021. It is co-owned by EDF Renewables and Enbridge.

== See also ==
- List of wind farms in Canada
- List of largest power stations in Canada
