= Gulf Wind Farm =

American high-power-producing wind farm

Gulf Wind
- Country: United States
- Location: Kenedy County, Texas
- Coordinates: 27°05′16.02″N 97°35′22.02″W
- Commission date: 2009
- Construction cost: $740 million
- Owner: Pattern Energy Group

Wind farm
- Type: Onshore

Power generation
- Units operational: 118 × 2.3 MW
- Make and model: Siemens Gamesa SWT-2.3-108
- Nameplate capacity: 271 MW

External links
- Website: patternenergy.com/projects/gulf-wind/

Gulf Wind is a 271 megawatt wind farm located on the Texas Gulf Coast in Kenedy County. It is operated by Pattern Energy which is based in San Francisco. The wind farm's output is contracted under a 20-year power purchase agreement with Austin Energy.

== History ==
Gulf Wind first generated electricity for the Texas power grid in November 2008, with all turbines expected operational by September 2010. Gulf Wind's former owner Babcock & Brown sold the development rights to Pattern Energy in 2009.

In 2021 Pattern Energy replaced its Mitsubishi 2.4 MW turbines with Siemens Gamesa SWT-2.3-108 turbines. This changed total output from 283.3 to 271.4 MW.

=== Hurricane Harvey ===
Gulf Wind farm was operational during most of Hurricane Harvey's landfall in Texas in August 2017, with turbines only shutting down when winds reach 55 miles per hour (89 km/h), and returning to normal operation the next day.

== See also ==
- Wind power in Texas
- List of wind farms
