= Henvey Inlet First Nation =

Ojibwe band government in Ontario

Henvey Inlet First Nation is an Ojibwe First Nations band government in Parry Sound District, Ontario, Canada. It has two reserves; French River 13and Henvey Inlet 2, and is a member of the Waabnoong Bemjiwang Association of First Nations.
