= Centennial Wind Power Facility =

Wind farm in Saskatchewan, Canada

Coordinates: 50°10′N 107°28′W

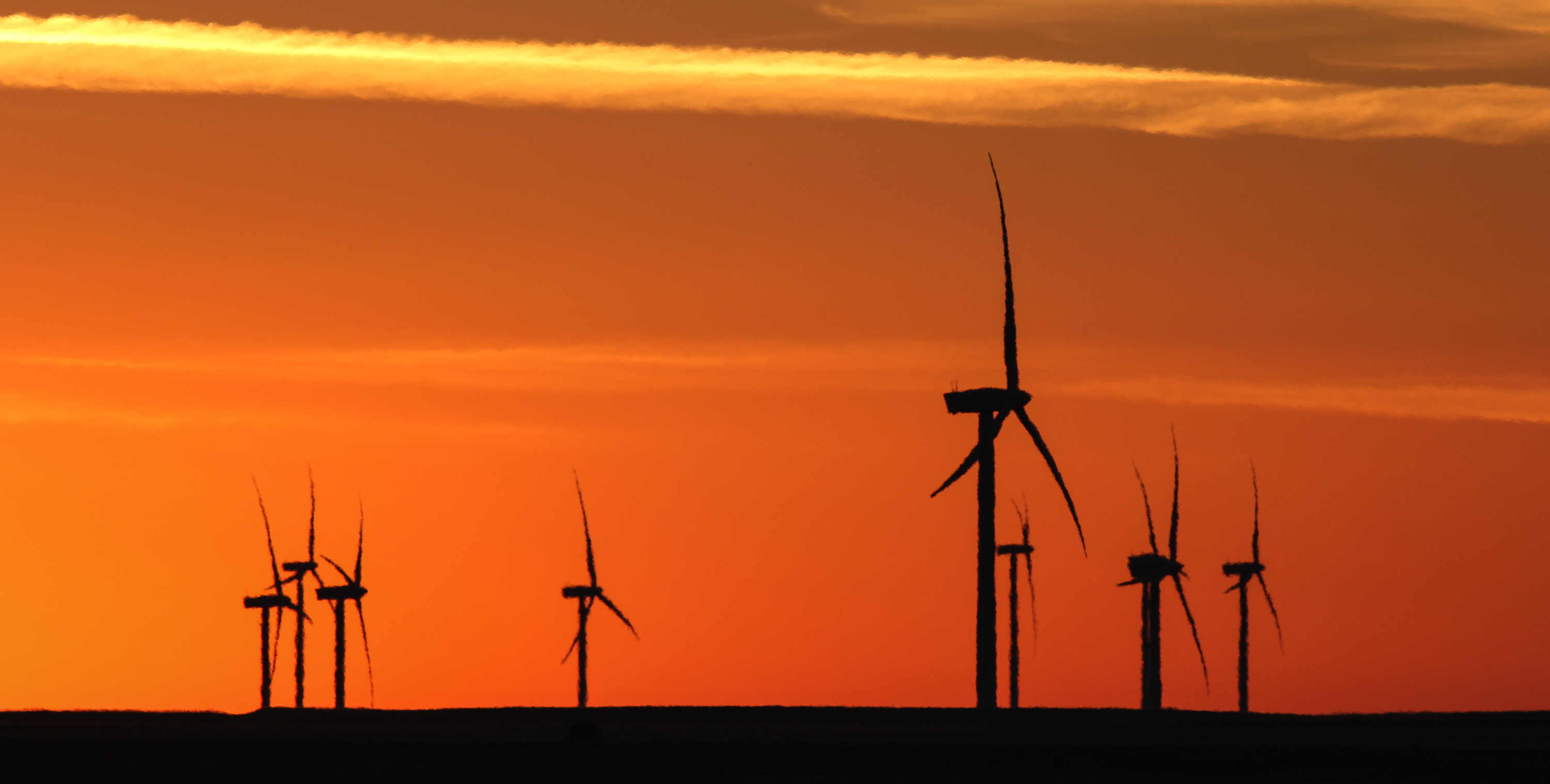
Photo of a portion of the Centennial Wind Power Facility at sunrise.

The Centennial Wind Power Facility is a wind farm built by SaskPower with a nameplate capacity of 150 MW. It is located in the hills roughly 25 kilometres (16 mi) east of Swift Current, Saskatchewan. The wind farm was the first in Canada to have a capacity of at least 100 MW upon completion in 2006.

The wind farm was built in two phases: first 75 and then 100 Senvion 2-megawatt wind turbines. The 150 megawatt wind farm has 83 Vestas V80 turbines, with a total rotor diameter of 80 metres and blade length of 39 metres, and can produce enough electricity for about 69,000 Saskatchewan homes.

== See also ==
- List of generating stations in Saskatchewan
- List of wind farms in Canada
