= Port Alma Wind Farm =

Coordinates: 42°14′N 82°24′W

Port Alma Wind Farm is a large wind farm project located on the north shore of Lake Erie in the Municipality of Chatham–Kent, Ontario, Canada.

It began generating electricity in November, 2008. It is owned and operated by Kruger Energy. The power will be fed into the Ontario electricity market administered by the Independent Electricity System Operator.

The wind farm consists of forty four Siemens 2.3 (MW) Mark II wind turbines, with an installed capacity of 101.2 (MW). It is capable of generating approx. 300 (GWh) annually, which will produce enough energy to power 30,000 households.Port Alma Current Output

The project study area is approx. 285 km^{2} centred on Port Alma.

A substation was built to step-up the power to transmission level voltage and approximately 10 kilometres (6.2 mi) of transmission line was built for connection to the Hydro One owned 230 kV circuits about 10 kilometres (6.2 mi) east of Tilbury.

== See also ==
- List of wind farms in Canada
- List of offshore wind farms
