= Amaranth Wind Farm =

Wind farm in Ontario, Canada

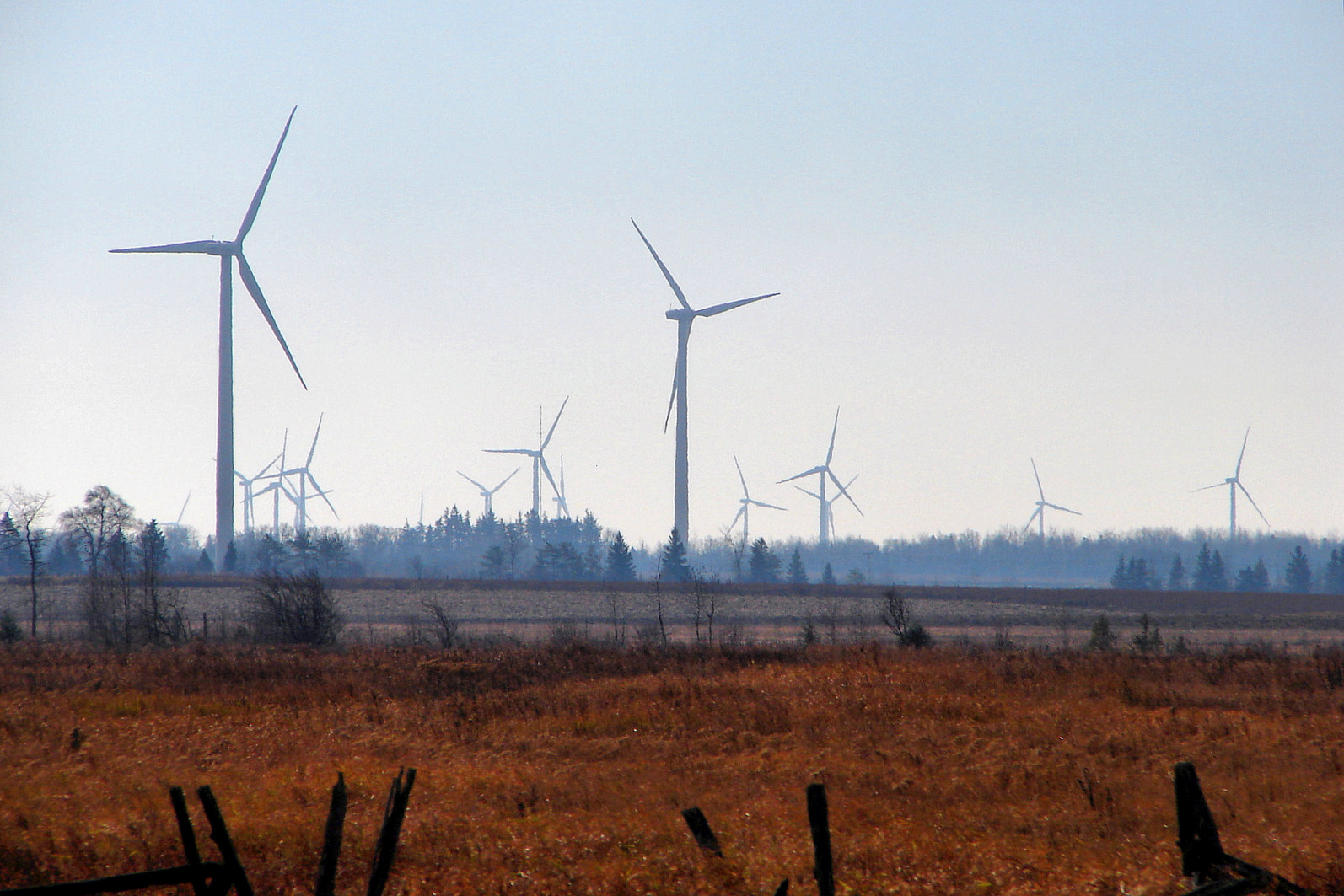
- Wind farm in Melancthon
- Country: Canada
- Location: Amaranth and Melancthon Township, near Shelburne, Ontario
- Coordinates: 44.1001°N 80.2709°W
- Status: Operational
- Construction began: 2005
- Commission date: March 4, 2006
- Owner: TransAlta
- Operator: TransAlta

Power generation
- Nameplate capacity: 199.5 megawatt (MW)

The Amaranth Wind Farm, also known as the Melancthon EcoPower Centre, is a 199.5 megawatt (MW) wind farm in Amaranth and Melancthon Township, near Shelburne, Ontario. The centre is owned and operated by TransAlta and at the time of opening, was Canada's largest wind energy installation.

Construction of the Melancthon EcoPower Centre began with the 67.5 MW Phase I in 2005 and achieved commercial operation in March 2006. Construction of the 132 MW Phase II of the project began in 2007 and achieved full commercial operation in November 2008.

Production (MWh)
Year	January	February	March	April	May	June	July	August	September	October	November	December	Total
2006			12,573	13,492	11,498	8,638	10,324	7,839	11,030	18,015	12,510	13,862	119,781
2007	18,470	23,277	22,560	18,336	10,987	10,378	8,815	9,401	12,534	16,443	18,535	16,788	144,777
2008	23,787	16,251	18,693	16,572	17,282	1,099	10,295	8,514	10,335	25,212	28,275	60,570	196,847
2009	37,241	46,671	41,574	60,296	44,804	16,146	24,206	27,082	22,486	37,486	33,605	45,656	353,341
2010	40,011	32,938	41,482	48,357	35,734	26,737	24,205	26,171	42,257	43,596	45,989	38,929	373,457
2011	31,446	58,097	39,918	54,141	33,894	28,884	20,175	22,761	26,487	39,129	59,551	46,687	371,627
2012	56,528	48,007	50,073	45,564	25,606	36,410	17,588						175,241

== See also ==
- List of wind farms in Canada
- List of offshore wind farms
