= Bear Mountain Wind Park =

Wind farm in British Columbia, Canada

Coordinates: 55°42′N 120°26′W

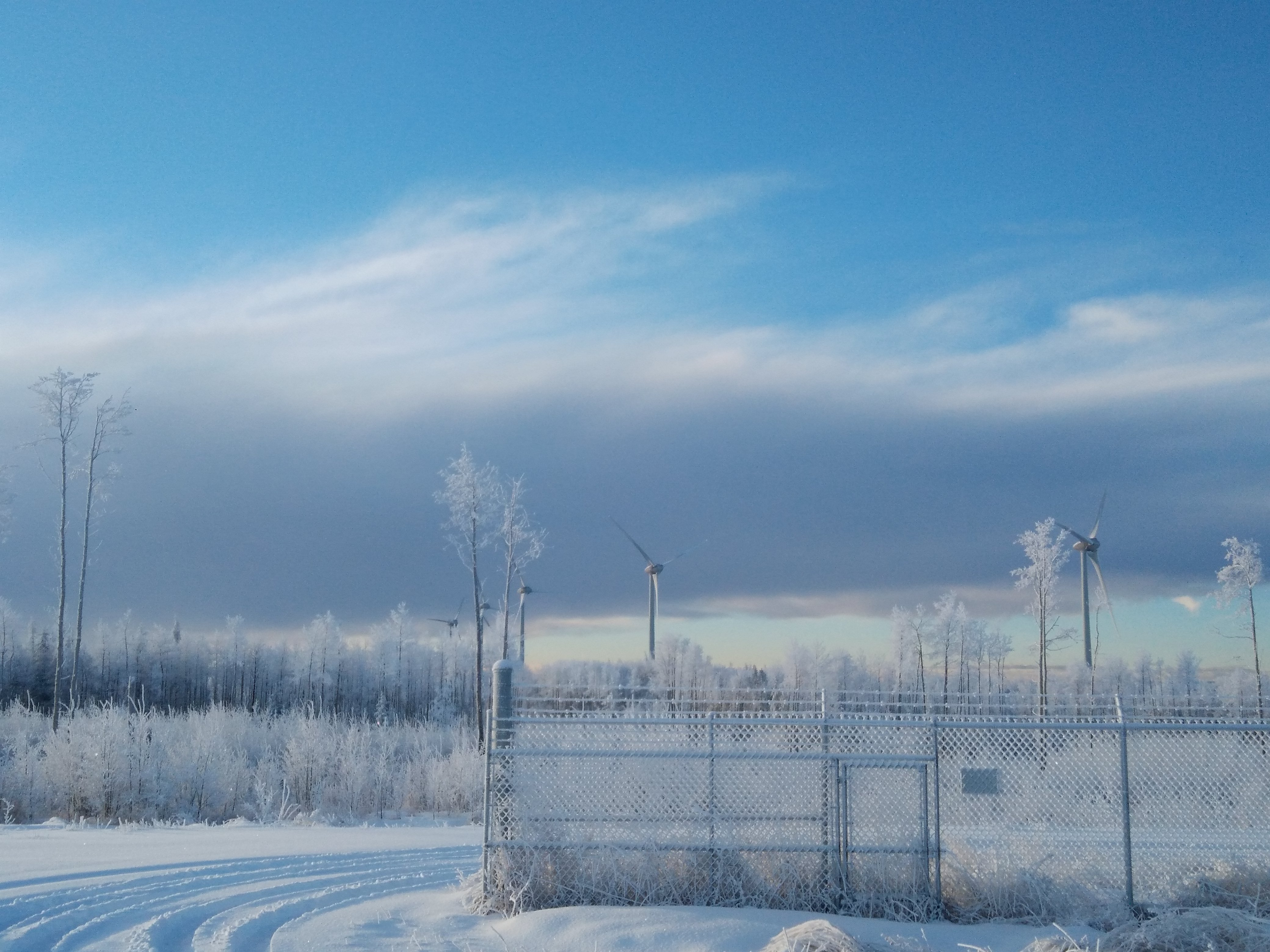
View south of substation

The Bear Mountain Wind Park is an electricity generating wind farm facility located near Dawson Creek, British Columbia, Canada. It is owned by Bear Mountain Wind LP and began operations in November, 2009. BC's first operating wind farm has a generating capacity of 102 megawatts. It uses 34 turbines in a single row along Bear Mountain ridge. The turbines are Enercon E-82.

== See also ==
- List of wind farms in Canada
