= Lac Alfred Wind Project =

Wind farm in Quebec, Canada

Coordinates: 48.414163°N 67.687798°W

The Lac Alfred Wind Project is a wind farm developed by EDF EN Canada and owned by EDF EN Canada and Enbridge. It is located near the village of Amqui, Quebec. The project has a nameplate capacity of 300 MW and was the highest capacity wind farm in Canada from its opening in August 2013 to May 2014.

Construction of the project was completed in early 2016. It is currently operated and maintained by Senvion Canada Inc. and EDF Renewable Services Inc.

== See also ==
- List of wind farms in Canada
- List of largest power stations in Canada
