= Lachenaie landfill =

Landfill in Terrebonne, Quebec

Coordinates: 45.7223°N 73.5760°W

The Lachenaie landfill is operated by BFI Canada Inc.

The Lachenaie landfill is located in Terrebonne, Quebec, on the north-eastern shore of Montreal. Along with the Ste. Sophie landfill, these two sites collect garbage for the Greater Montreal Area.

The Lachenaie landfill began receiving municipal solid waste in 1968. Currently, Lachenaie receives approximately 30% of the residual materials produced by the Greater Montreal Area.

Non-hazardous waste comes from the cities of Montreal and Laval as well as from the municipalities of L’Assomption, Thérèse-De-Blainville, Deux-Montagnes, Joliette, Montcalm, Mirabel, Rivière-du-Nord and Montérégie.

The Lachenaie landfill is owned and operated by BFI Canada Inc.

Construction of the landfill to gas collection field and power plant was completed to generate electricity in January 1996. Its electricity is fed into the Hydro Quebec energy grid. The plant generates enough power to satisfy the requirements of approximately 2,500 homes annually.

== See also ==
- Ste. Sophie landfill
- Official website of the Lachenaie landfill
