= Saint-Robert-Bellarmin Wind Project =

Coordinates: 45.734943°N 70.52536°W

The Saint-Robert-Bellarmin Wind Project is a wind farm in the municipality of Saint-Robert-Bellarmin, Quebec in Canada. It has been in commercial operation since October 16, 2012. It has 40 wind turbines, each of 2 MW power, for a total capacity of 80 MW. It delivers energy to Hydro-Québec.

The wind project was developed and is owned by EDF EN Canada Inc. It is operated and maintained by REpower Systems Inc. and EDF Renewable Services Inc.

== See also ==
- List of wind farms in Canada
