= André Caillé =

André Caillé (born September 11, 1943) is a Canadian electricity company executive.

André Caillé was the chairman of Hydro-Québec from September 2004 to November 2007 and the chairman of the World Energy Congress. From October 1996 until April 2005, he was president and chief executive officer of Hydro-Québec. From 1982 until 1996, he was an executive of Gaz Métropolitain, a distributor of natural gas. He is a chemist, and earned a doctorate in physical chemistry (1968) from the Université de Montréal.

He has been chancellor of the Université de Montréal. He was president of the Mental Illness Foundation.

Administrator and Senior strategic advisor for Junex since April 2008. President of the QOGA (Quebec Oil and Gas Association) created in April 2009.

== Political views ==
Quebec's Deputy Minister of the Environment from 1978 to 1981.

Caillé affirmed he voted Yes in the 1995 Quebec referendum on sovereignty, but stated he presently believes the ADQ's autonomist policy is more concurrent with the feelings of Quebecers. Caillé also considered the notion of being a candidate for the Conservative Party of Canada in the 2008 national election as well, but did not.
