= French River 13 =

- Indian reserve
- French River Indian Reserve No. 13
- Location within Southern Ontario
- Coordinates: 46°00′N 80°31′W
- Country: Canada
- Province: Ontario
- District: Parry Sound

Government
  - Body: Henvey Inlet First Nation

Area
  - Land: 27.04 km^{2} (10.44 sq mi)

Population (2016)
  - Total: 117
  - Density: 4.3/km^{2} (11/sq mi)
- Website: www.hifn.ca

French River 13 is an Ojibway First Nations reserve in Parry Sound District, Ontario. It is one of the reserves of the Henvey Inlet First Nation.

== Demographics ==
Canada census – French River 13 community profile

	2021	2016	2011
Population	137 (+17.1% from 2016)	117 (-14.6% from 2011)	137 (38.4% from 2006)
Land area	25.85 km^{2} (9.98 sq mi)	27.04 km^{2} (10.44 sq mi)	26.54 km^{2} (10.25 sq mi)
Population density	5.3/km^{2} (14/sq mi)	4.3/km^{2} (11/sq mi)	5.2/km^{2} (13/sq mi)
Median age	26.2 (M: 25.8, F: 31.4)	33.8 (M: 33.5, F: 34.5)	29.5 (M: 30.5, F: 29.0)
Private dwellings	55 (total) 52 (occupied)	54 (total)	56 (total)
Median household income		$33,408

References: 2021 2016 2011

Historical census populations
Year	Pop.	±%
1986	72	—
1991	90	+25.0%
1996	157	+74.4%
2001	121	−22.9%
2006	99	−18.2%
2011	137	+38.4%
2016	117	−14.6%
