= Rivière-du-Moulin Wind Project =

Wind farm in Canada

Coordinates: 47.957°N 71.060°W

The Rivière-du-Moulin Wind Project is a wind farm built by EDF Énergies Nouvelles with a nameplate capacity of 350 MW. It is located roughly 50 km south of Saguenay, Quebec in the Regional County Municipality of Charlevoix and Le Fjord du Saguenay. It was built in two phases of 75 and then 100 Senvion 2-megawatt wind turbines.

The first phase of 150 MW was commissioned in December 2014, the second phase of 200 MW in late 2015.

== See also ==
- List of wind farms in Canada
- List of largest power stations in Canada
