= Mesgi'g Ugju's'n Wind Farm =

Wind farm in Quebec

- Country: Canada
- Coordinates: 48°13′05″N 66°42′26″W
- Status: Operational
- Construction began: June 22, 2015
- Commission date: 2017
- Construction cost: $330,000,000 (2013)
- Owner: Parc éolien Mesgi'g Ugju's'n (MU) S.E.C

Wind farm
- Hub height: 100 m
- Rotor diameter: 114 m
- Rated wind speed: 12 m/s
- Site area: 25,863 ha

Power generation
- Units operational: 47
- Make and model: Senvion 3.2M114
- Nameplate capacity: 149.25 MW

External links
- Website: www.muwindfarm.com

The Mesgi'g Ugju's'n (MU) Wind Farm, "big wind" in Mi'gmaq is a 149.25 megawatt (MW) wind farm currently under construction in eastern Quebec, Canada. The MU wind farm is expected to produce enough electricity to power approximately 30,000 homes. The wind project is owned and developed in a 50-50 partnership between the three Mi’gmaq First Nations (Listuguj, Gesgapegiag, Gespeg) and Innergex Renewable Energy.

The wind farm became operational in 2017.

== See also ==
- List of wind farms in Canada
