= Jardin d'Eole Wind Farm =

Wind farm in Saint-Ulric, Quebec, Canada

Coordinates: 48°48′N 67°36′W

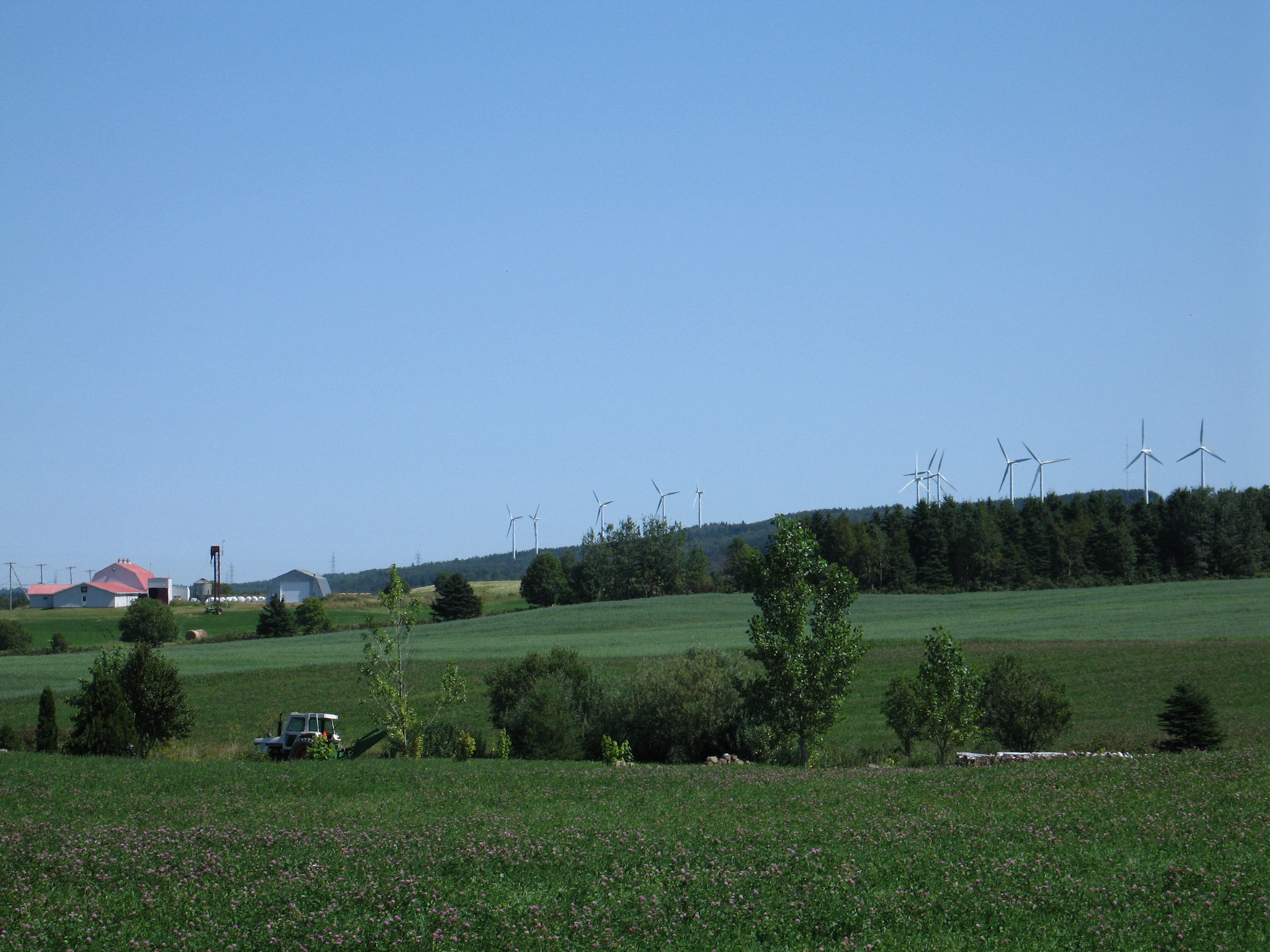
Jardin d'Eole Wind Farm

The Jardin d'Eole Wind Farm is a 127.5 megawatt (MW) wind farm, located in Saint-Ulric, near Matane, Quebec. It is owned and operated by Northland Power.

The wind farm began commercial operations in December 2009. The project uses 85 General Electric 1.5-MW wind turbines.

The Jardin d'Eole Wind Farm sells electricity to Hydro-Québec under a 20-year power purchase agreement. The project was completed 11 days ahead of schedule and well within its $268 million total budget.

== See also ==
- List of onshore wind farms
- List of wind farms in Canada
- Wind power in Canada
