= Ripley Wind Power Project =

Wind power project in Ontario, Canada

Coordinates: 44°04′N 81°31′W

The Ripley Wind Power Project is a 76 megawatt (MW) wind power project near Ripley, Ontario.

The wind farm includes 38 Enercon E-82 wind turbines, each with two megawatt rated power, 82m rotor diameter and 79m hub height as well as a transmission line and two electrical sub-stations. The wind farm is located on the shores of Lake Huron in Huron-Kinloss Township, approximately 220 kilometres west of Toronto and 140 kilometres north of London.

The project is expected to have the capacity to generate enough zero-emission electricity to power 24,000 homes and offset approximately 66,000 tonnes of carbon dioxide annually. Project cost is estimated at $176 million Canadian dollars.

Production (MWh)
Year	January	February	March	April	May	June	July	August	September	October	November	December	Total
2007											986	15,344	16,330
2008	25,666	18,181	19,954	19,424	17,985	10,630	9,597	8,233	9,455	20,042	23,460	32,343	171,123
2009	21,783	21,853	19,844	22,978	16,914	5,673	6,304	11,683	8,711	16,606	15,280	20,316	144,309
2010	21,322	12,583	15,277	18,974	12,864	9,487	7,497	10,381	17,901	16,393	21,621	30,108	160,503
2011	18,602	25,266	18,058	20,833	14,441	8,970	6,794	8,338	12,172	17,074	29,258	24,377	160,315
2012	26,133	20,590	23,762	19,329	10,790	12,803	7,438						120,845

== See also ==
- List of wind farms in Canada
- List of offshore wind farms
