= Saint-Robert-Bellarmin =

- Municipality
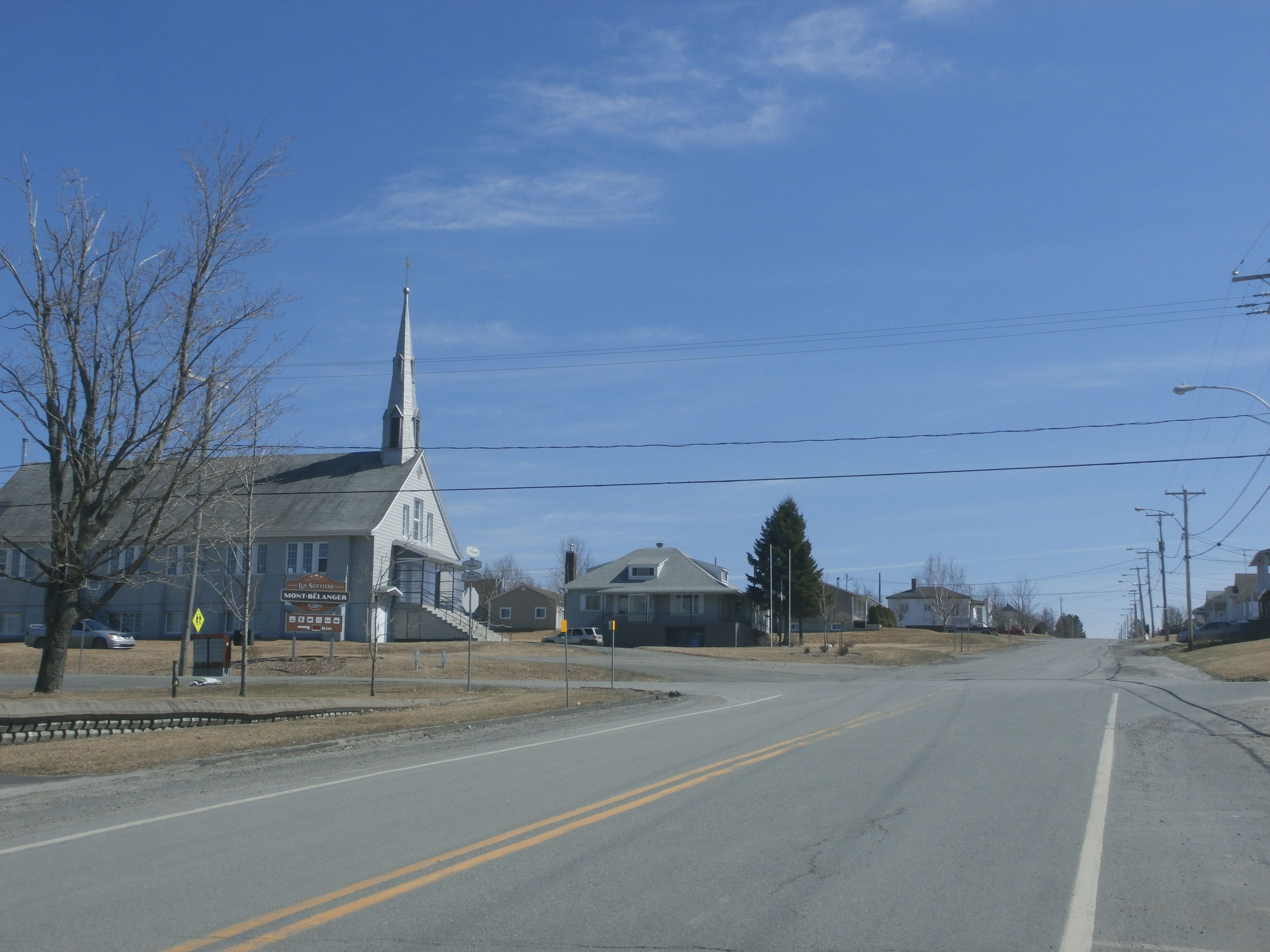
- Downtown Saint-Robert-Bellarmin

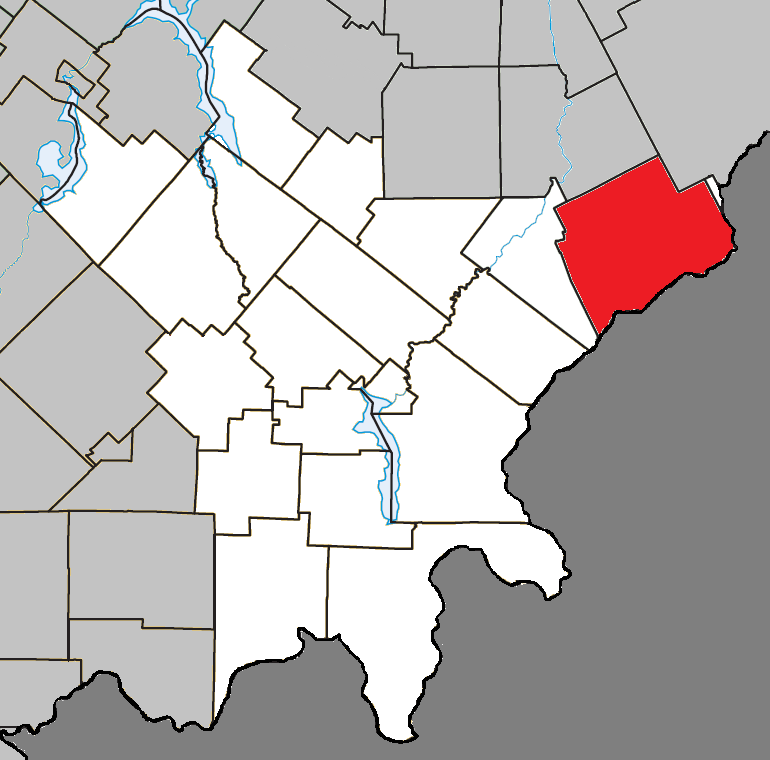
- Location within Le Granit RCM

- Location in southern Quebec
- Coordinates: 45°45′N 70°35′W
- Country: Canada
- Province: Quebec
- Region: Estrie
- RCM: Le Granit
- Constituted: January 1, 1949

Government
  - Mayor: Marilyn Lévesque
  - Federal riding: Mégantic—L'Érable—Lotbinière
  - Prov. riding: Beauce-Sud

Area
  - Total: 237.80 km^{2} (91.82 sq mi)
  - Land: 236.33 km^{2} (91.25 sq mi)

Population (2021)
  - Total: 529
  - Density: 2.2/km^{2} (5.7/sq mi)
  - Pop 2016-2021: ▼8%
  - Dwellings: 237
- Time zone: UTC−5 (EST)
  - Summer (DST): UTC−4 (EDT)
- Postal code(s): G0M 2E0
- Area codes: 418 and 581
- Highways: No major routes
- Website: www.st-robertbellarmin.qc.ca

Saint-Robert-Bellarmin is a municipality in the Municipalité régionale de comté du Granit in Estrie, Quebec, Canada, located on the Canada–United States border. Population is 529 as of 2021.

It is also the location of the Saint-Robert-Bellarmin Wind Project, an 80 MW project located 3 km East-South-East of the town.

The local economy revolves mostly around lumber, sugar bushes and the seasonal deer hunt. Many Bellarminois work in neighbouring Saint-Gédéon-de-Beauce.

The municipality was named after Robert Bellarmine, an Italian Jesuit who participated actively in the Counter-Reformation.

== History ==
The area had already been settled since 1907. At this time, the parish priest of Gayhurst looked after his parishioners. Saint-Robert-Bellarmin was created in 1949 when sections of Saint-Gédéon and Risborough-et-Marlow were merged to create the new municipality.

== Geography ==
The territory of Saint-Robert-Bellarmin is equidistant from Saint-Gédéon-de-Beauce, to the north, and Saint-Ludger, to the west, from which it is a dozen kilometers away, Saint-Robert-Bellarmin is bounded in its southern part by the border which separates Quebec of Maine. The rivière du Loup and ruisseau du Loup are the two most important watercourses in the area. A mountainous expanse, the territory of Saint-Robert-Bellarmin is dominated by Mount Sandy Stream, which rises to 950 m.
