= Port Burwell Wind Farm =

Wind farm near Port Burwell, Ontario, Canada

Coordinates: 42°37′N 80°40′W

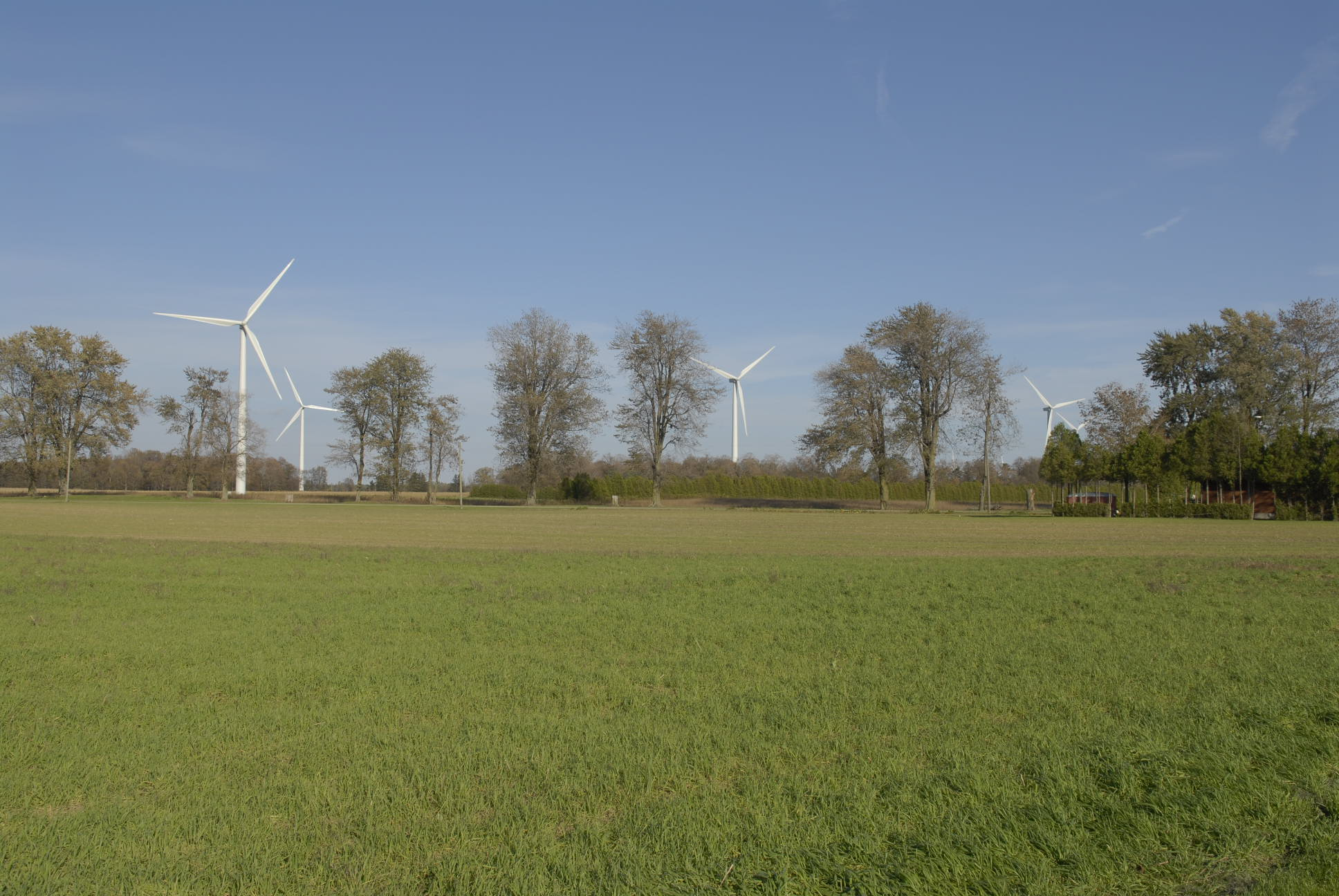
Wind Farm environment

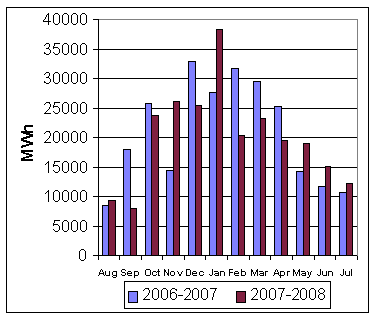
Wind farm monthly output

Port Burwell Wind Farm (formerly known as the Erie Shores Wind Farm) is a large wind farm near Port Burwell, Ontario, Canada. The facility stretches approximately 8 kilometres (5.0 mi) to the west of the town, and 16 kilometres (9.9 mi) to the southeast.

In 2004, Port Burwell was awarded a generation contract by the Government of Ontario as part of its renewable energy plan. This wind farm was officially opened on April 13, 2006.

The project comprises 66 GE 1.5 MW Wind Turbines (model 1.5 SLE). Each turbine has a blade diameter of 77 metres (253 ft), and is mounted on an 80-metre (260 ft) tubular tower.

An important measure of renewable energy generation is the capacity factor (actual output per year divided by the nameplate output). In 2009 the output was 232,296 megawatt-hours (836,270 GJ) and in 2010 the output was 227,778 megawatt-hours (820,000 GJ), so the capacity factor was 26.8% and 26.2% respectively. Published reports show that the developers were expecting the capacity factor to be higher – 28.6% to 32%.

Production (MWh)
Year	January	February	March	April	May	June	July	August	September	October	November	December	Total
2006				780	2,726	9,145	12,226	8,393	18,044	25,678	14,420	32,949	124,361
2007	27,634	31,724	29,335	25,257	14,229	11,814	10,728	9,301	7,955	23,845	26,039	25,285	183,788
2008	38,123	20,368	23,256	19,545	19,029	15,180	12,295	10,853	11,875	23,044	23,076	37,186	195,339
2009	28,053	23,673	20,186	29,483	17,401	8,577	10,267	12,469	12,453	24,904	17,844	26,964	180,548
2010	26,269	15,324	18,913	21,368	19,610	13,066	9,122	9,510	18,376	23,895	23,582	28,725	186,167
2011	20,142	31,043	19,439	25,301	14,633	12,641	8,801	9,394	13,753	20,943	34,548	26,020	185,473
2012	33,682	25,593	24,667	19,700	12,548	15,199	9,338						81,452

== See also ==
- List of wind farms in Canada
