= Cascades Inc. =

Canadian packaging company

- Type: Public
- Traded as: TSX: CAS
- Founded: 1957; 69 years ago
- Founder: Lemaire Brothers
- Headquarters: Kingsey Falls, Quebec, Canada
- Key people: Hugues Simon (CEO)
- Revenue: ▲CAD 4.638 billion (2023)
- Operating income: ▲CAD 40 millions (2023)
- Net income: ▼CAD -76 million (2023)
- Total assets: ▼CAD 4.772 billion (2023)
- Total equity: ▼CAD 1.781 billion (2023)
- Number of employees: 10,000 (2023)
- Website: https://www.cascades.com/en

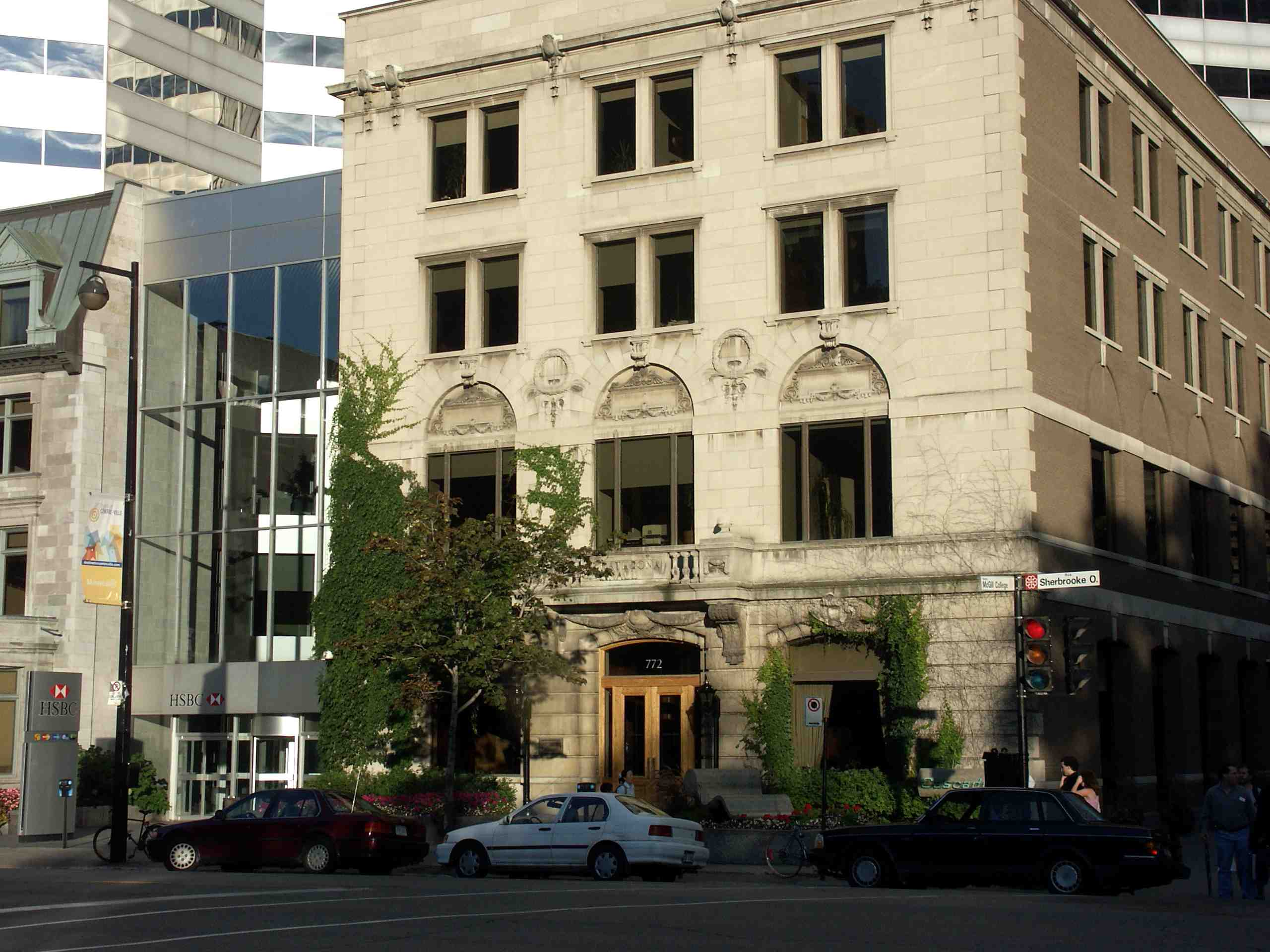
The company's Montreal offices on Sherbrooke Street West

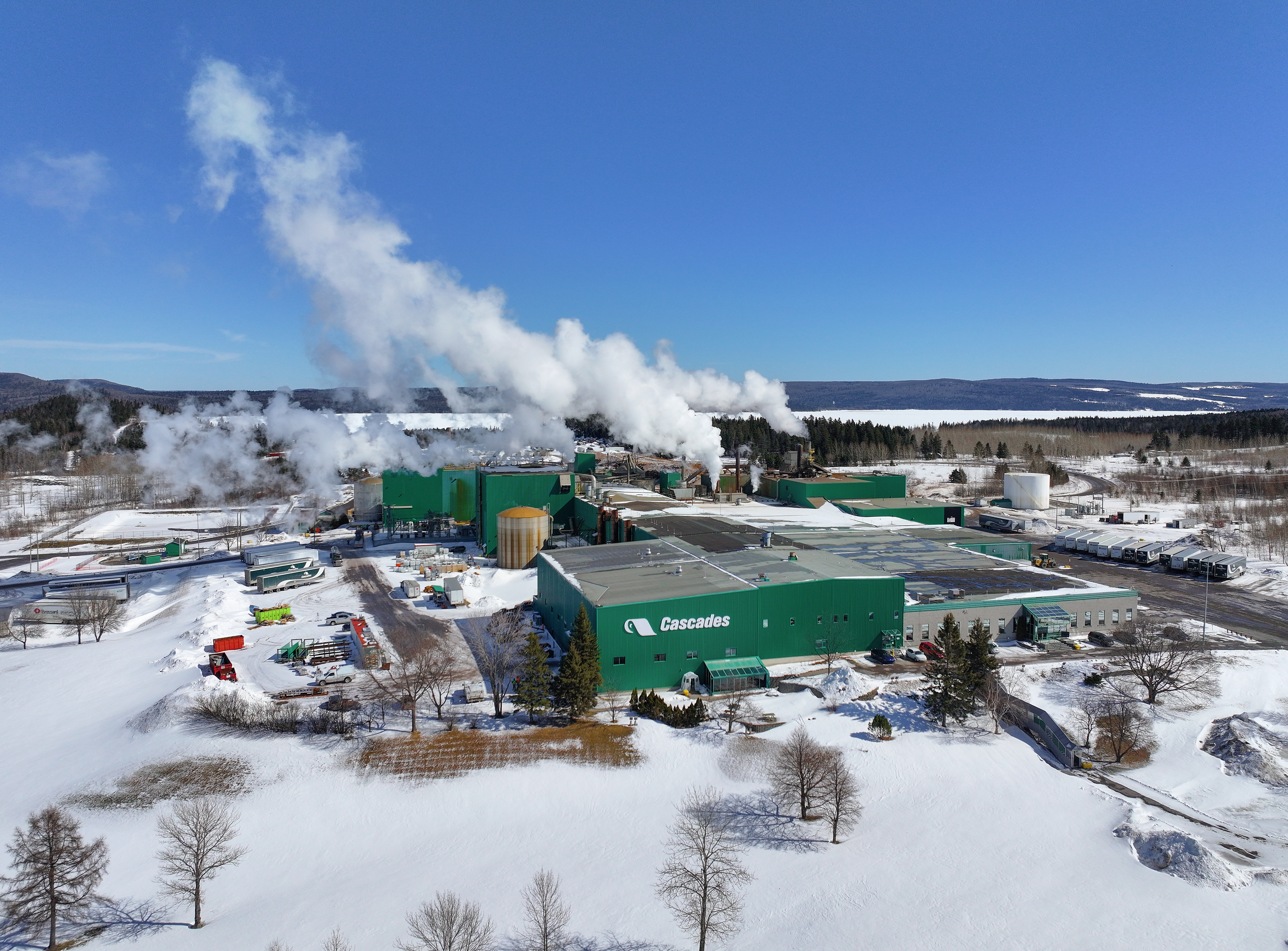
A cardboard packaging plant in Témiscouata-sur-le-Lac, Quebec

Cascades Inc. is a Canadian company that produces, converts, and markets packaging and tissue products composed mainly of recycled fibres. Cascades employs around 10,000 people in more than 70 operating units in North America. It was founded in 1964.

== History ==
The Lemaire family founded the Drummond Pulp & Fibre company in 1957, which recovered household and industrial waste. In 1964, Antonio Lemaire and his sons officially ventured into the production of paper made from recycled fibres when they took over a mill in Kingsey Falls, Quebec from the Dominion Paper Co.. Papier Cascades Inc. was born of that transaction.

In 1971, Cascades began its expansion in Kingsey Falls with the creation of Cascades Forma-Pak, its first moulded-pulp mill to use 100% recycled fibres. From 1972 to 1977: the company started Papier Kingsey Falls (multi-layer board), Cascades Industries (tissue paper), Plastiques Cascades and Cascades Conversion. In 1976, the Lemaire brothers started the production of container board in Cabano, Québec.

In 1983 Cascades' shares began trading on the Montreal Stock Exchange. That same year, its entry into the United States began with the start-up of Cascades Industries Inc. in Rockingham, North Carolina. In Québec, Cascades began producing kraft paper in East Angus, Quebec and acquired a boxboard plant in Jonquière, Quebec, the following year.

In 1985, the company made its entry into Europe with the acquisition of a boxboard plant in La Rochette, France. This new expansion took shape in 1986 with the creation of Cascades S.A. and the acquisition of another French boxboard mill in Blendecques. From 1987 to 1989, other mills located in Sweden and Belgium became part of the Cascades Group as well: Djupafors AB in Sweden and Kartonfabriek van Duffel NV in Belgium. The Belgian mill was renamed Cascades Duffel NV but ceased its production in 1993 after heavy losses and then was immediately transformed into a cutting center for the other European mills of the group. Declared definitively closed in the accounts of 1997, it was reconverted in 2002 by the ex-president of the board of Cascades, Laurent Lemaire, to a so-called internal commercial agency. This so-called agency (before different fiscal controles ...), without collaborator working in Belgium, was implied at the time of exports of cartonboard out of Europe, in particular those in transit by the port of Antwerp (according to boards of directors of Cascades SA of June 28, 2002 and Nov 3, 2003). After a final stop of her so-called activities in 2005 (due to fiscal controles in other Cascades mills in France and Germany), Cascades Duffel NV was "liquidated" with immediate effect on 28 December 2011.

== Expansion ==
In 1985, Cascades opened a Research and Development Center in 1985 in Kingsey Falls. The facility became the largest private Canadian Research and Development Center in the pulp and paper industry.

Cascades then created Cascades Énergie. This subsidiary controlled a brand new cogeneration plant powered by natural gas, the first in Canada. Its mandate was to provide the energy required by all the Cascades mills in Kingsey Falls. The success of this project enabled Cascades to invest further in the prospective energy sector with the acquisition of Boralex in 1995. Today, Boralex's shares are traded on the Toronto Stock Exchange in which Cascades holds a 34% interest.

Cascades Énergie paved the way for a series of acquisitions in which Cascades' activities were largely diversified. The purchase of Rolland and Paperboard Industries Corporation in 1992, Perkins Papers in 1995, Provincial Papers in 1997 and, that same year, the creation of Norampac in partnership with Domtar, led to the restructuring of Cascades into five distinct corporate groups whose operations were focused as much in the sector of specialized packaging as in those of containerboard, tissue paper, fine papers and boxboard.

On an international level, Cascades' expansion continued in Europe with the acquisition of the boxboard mill in Arnsberg in Germany in 1997 and the start-up of a sheeting operation in Wednesbury in the United Kingdom in 1998.

In 2001, Cascades acquired mills in Pennsylvania and in Wisconsin. Two years later, the group set up operations in Alberta, New York, Arizona, Oregon and Tennessee. In 2004, the boxboard sector stood out with the acquisition of Dopaco Inc., a leader in the packaging products sector destined for the quick service restaurant industry. Norampac proceeded with the implementation, between 2001 and 2006, of several ultra-modern corrugated cardboard mills in Canada and in the United States.

In 2004, Cascades created in Europe four new companies in Luxembourg (Cascades Luxembourg Sarl, Norampac Luxembourg Sarl, Cascades Hungary Ltd Luxembourg Branch and Norampac Ltd Luxembourg Branch). Beginning of 2010 Cascades Canada Inc Luxembourg Branch was created, and with the closure of Cascade(s) Duffel NV in Belgium, the closure of Norampac Ltd Luxembourg Branch and the existing Pulp & Paper Cascades NV (become BV ?) in the Netherlands, that carries to four the number of companies in service in 2012 into the Benelux without any co-worker who works on it. Norampac Luxembourg Sarl was closed in September 2008 by incorporation into Cascades Luxembourg Sarl (new capital February 2012: USD 64 933 600,00) and beginning of February 2012, Cascades Canada Inc Luxemburg Branch changed her name to Cascades Canada ULC Luxembourg Branch.

In summer 2017, Cascades opened a new mill in Scappoose, Oregon. The Cascades Tissue Group Oregon converting plant employed 80 full-time workers in the production of its paper products.

== Recent history ==
During the 2000s, Cascades closed mills in Thunder Bay, Montréal, Red Rock, Pickering, Buffalo, New York and Boissy-le-Châtel. In 2005, the company proceeded with the sale of its fine papers (Cascades Resources) and its tissue paper (Wood Wyant) distribution assets.

With the purchase of Domtar's shares in Norampac in 2006 and the merger of its European boxboard operations with Reno de Medici in 2007, Cascade has consolidated its position as a leader in the containerboard and boxboard sectors.

In 2008, North-American boxboard activities were integrated into Norampac's cartonboard activities. In addition to creating synergy, this integration led to the creation of a larger packaging group.

In 2011, Cascades named Mario Plourde chief operating officer, enabling Alain Lemaire, president and chief executive officer, to devote more time to the strategic vision of the company. Also in 2011, Cascades sold Dopaco Inc., its paper cup and carton converting business for the quick-service restaurant and foodservice industries, to Reynolds Group Holdings Limited.

Cascades is a member of the Forest Products Association of Canada. Cascades is focusing on products that contain a high percentage of recycled fibres.

In 2003 and 2004, Cascades was named one of "Canada's Top 100 Employers" by MediaCorp Canada Inc. It was also awarded the same title in October 2008.

In 2017, Cascades exited its position in Boralex by selling it to Caisse de dépôt et placement du Québec (the Caisse) for an amount of $ 287.5 million.

In 2021, Cascades announced the monetization of its controlling interest in RDM Group, ending 35 years of operations in Europe.
