= Innergex Renewable Energy =

Canadian renewable energy company

Innergex Renewable Energy Inc.
- Type: Subsidiary
- Industry: Electric generation
- Genre: Independent Power Producer
- Founded: 1990; 36 years ago
- Founder: Gilles Lefrançois
- Headquarters: Longueuil, Québec, Canada
- Key people: Michel Letellier (president & CEO); Jean La Couture (chairman)
- Revenue: ▲ Can$576.6 million (2018)
- Net income: ▲ Can$25.7 million (2018)
- Total assets: ▲ Can$6.48 billion (2018)
- Total equity: ▲ Can$629.8 million (2018)
- Parent: La Caisse
- Website: www.innergex.com

Innergex Renewable Energy Inc. is a developer, owner and operator of run-of-river hydroelectric facilities, wind energy, and solar farms in North America, France and South America. While many of the firm's operational assets are located in its home province of Québec, it has expanded into Ontario, British Columbia, and Idaho, as well as Chile and France.

== Business segments ==
The company has four reportable segments: hydroelectric production, wind power production, solar power production, and site development and management. Through its energy production segments it sells electricity produced from its hydroelectric facilities, wind farms, and solar farms in operation to publicly owned entities. Through its site development and management segment, the company develops energy production facilities to the operational stage and then manages them.

== Corporate history ==
Innergex Renewable Energy was founded in 1990 by Gilles Lefrançois under the name Innergex GP in response to the Québec government's call for private sector bids to develop small hydro generation facilities. The firm went on to develop four of its own projects (Saint-Paulin, Chaudière, Batawa and Pontneuf 1-2-3) and acquire another (Montmagny) before transferring these assets into the Innergex Renewable Energy Income Fund, which listed on the Toronto Stock Exchange in 2003.

In 2004, Innergex joined forces with TransCanada Corporation to bid on a Hydro-Québec call for tender for 1,000 MW of wind power. The two companies set up a joint venture, Cartier Wind Energy, with Innergex holding a 38% stake. In 2005, Cartier signed 20-year power purchase agreements for 739.5 MW to be generated at six locations on the Gaspé Peninsula. Five of the six projects were built between 2006 and 2012, including the 211.5 MW Gros-Morne Wind Farm, which became Canada's largest at the time of its commissioning, in late 2012.

In 2018, Innergex acquired Alterra Power Corporation, which made the company the largest independent renewable energy producer in British Columbia and among the largest in Canada. Four years later, it acquired what was left of Llaima Energía (50%) & Aela Energía the at the moment largest green energy provider in MW terms in Chile

In February 2025, La Caisse announced a bid to buy Innergex Renewable Energy in deal valued at $10 billion. The acquisition was completed on July 21, 2025.

== Power projects controlled by Innergex Renewable Energy ==
Innergex currently operates 28 renewable energy generation facilities: 22 run-of-river hydro plants, five wind farms and one solar farm. These projects have a combined net capacity of 577 MW.

== Operational power projects ==
Hydroelectric plants
Name	Commissioned	Gross installed capacity (MW)	Innergex's participation	Client	Expiration
Ashlu Creek	2009	49,9	100	BC Hydro	2039
Batawa	1999	5	100	Independent Electricity System Operator	2029
Brown Lake	2012	7,2	100	BC Hydro	2016
Chaudière	1999	24	100	Hydro-Québec	2019
Douglas Creek	2011	27	50	BC Hydro	2049
Fire Creek	2011	23	50	BC Hydro	2049
Fitzsimmons Creek	2010	7,5	66,7	BC Hydro	2050
Glen Miller	2005	8	100	Independent Electricity System Operator	2025
Horseshoe Bend	2003	9,5	100	Idaho Power	2030
Lamont Creek	2011	27	50	BC Hydro	2049
Miller Creek	2012	33	100	BC Hydro	2023
Montmagny	2000	2,1	100	Hydro-Québec	2021
Portneuf 1-2-3	1996	25,9	100	Hydro-Québec	2021
Rutherford Creek	2005	49,9	100	BC Hydro	2024
Saint-Paulin	1994	8	100	Hydro-Québec	2014
Stokke Creek	2011	22	50	BC Hydro	2049
Tipella Creek	2011	18	50	BC Hydro	2049
Umbata Falls	2008	23	49	Independent Electricity System Operator	2028
Upper Stave River	2011	33	50	BC Hydro	2049
Windsor	2004	5,5	100	Hydro-Québec	2016

Wind farms
Name	Commissioned	Gross installed capacity (MW)	Innergex's participation	Client	Expiration
Baie-des-Sables	2006	109,5	38	Hydro-Québec	2026
Carleton	2008	109,5	38	Hydro-Québec	2028
Gros-Morne	2011	211,5	38	Hydro-Québec	2032
L'Anse-à-Valleau	2007	100,5	38	Hydro-Québec	2027
Mesgi'g Ugju's'n Wind Farm	2016	149,3	50	Hydro-Québec	2037
Montagne Sèche	2011	58,5	38	Hydro-Québec	2031

Solar farms
Name	Commissioned	Gross installed capacity (MW)	Innergex's participation	Client	Expiration
Stardale	2012	33,2	100	Independent Electricity System Operator	2032

== See also ==
- Independent power producers in British Columbia
