= Pattern Energy =

Renewable energy company

Pattern Energy Group LP
- Company type: Private
- Industry: Electricity generation Energy development Renewable energy
- Founded: 2009
- Headquarters: San Francisco, California, United States
- Area served: United States; Canada; Mexico
- Key people: Hunter Armistead, CEO; Kristina Lund, President
- Products: Electricity
- Owner: CPP Investment Board
- Website: patternenergy.com

Pattern Energy Group LP is an American company that develops, owns and operates utility scale wind and solar power facilities in the United States, Canada, and Mexico. It is headquartered in San Francisco, California with an operations center in Houston, Texas.

== History ==
Pattern Energy was organized in 2009 by Riverstone Holdings to acquire assets from Babcock & Brown's North American wind energy group. In 2013 the company sold operating assets to Pattern Energy Group Inc. following that company's initial public offering (IPO). The development assets of Pattern Energy were retained by a privately held entity.

On March 16, 2020, Pattern Energy Group Inc. was acquired by Canada Pension Plan Investment Board (CPPIB) and taken private through a reverse merger transaction. In connection with the going private transaction, Pattern Energy Group LP acquired 28 renewable energy facilities from Pattern Energy Group Inc. with an aggregate operating capacity of 4.4 gigawatts. As of August 2023 the company's aggregate installed operating capacity was approaching 6,000 megawatts.

In July 2022, Pattern Energy acquired the SunZia Transmission line project from SouthWestern Power Group, through private funding.

== Facilities ==
As of August 2023, Pattern Energy owns and/or operates the following operational energy generation facilities:

=== United States ===
- Amazon Wind Farm (Fowler Ridge), Benton County, Indiana, United States
- Broadview Wind, Curry County, New Mexico, United States
- Gulf Wind in Kenedy County, Texas, United States
- Grady Wind, Curry County, New Mexico, United States
- Hatchet Ridge Wind in Burney, California, United States
- Logan's Gap Wind, Comanche County, Texas, United States
- Lost Creek Wind, DeKalb County, Missouri, United States
- Ocotillo Wind in Ocotillo, California, United States
- Panhandle Wind, Carson County, Texas, United States
- Panhandle 2 Wind, Carson County, Texas, United States
- Phoenix Solar, Fannin County, Texas, United States
- Post Rock Wind, Ellsworth and Lincoln Counties, Kansas, United States
- Santa Isabel Wind in Santa Isabel, Puerto Rico
- SunZia Wind and Transmission, Lincoln County, New Mexico (in development as of August 2023)
- Stillwater Wind, Stillwater County, Montana, United States
- Western Spirit Wind, Guadalupe, Lincoln and Torrance counties, New Mexico

=== Canada ===
- Armow Wind, Kincardine, Ontario, Canada
- Belle River Wind, Lakeshore, Ontario, Canada
- Grand Renewable Wind, Haldimand County, Ontario, Canada
- Henvey Inlet Wind, Henvey Inlet First Nation Reserve No. 2 Lands, Ontario, Canada
- K2 Wind, Ashfield-Colborne-Wawanosh, Ontario, Canada
- Lanfine Wind, Oyen, Alberta
- Meikle Wind, Peace River Regional District, British Columbia, Canada
- Mont Sainte Marguerite Wind, Chaudière-Appalaches region, Quebec, Canada
- North Kent Wind, Ontario, Canada
- South Kent Wind in South Kent, Ontario, Canada
- St. Joseph Wind in St. Joseph, Manitoba, Canada

=== Mexico ===
- Helios Solar, Mazapil Municipality, Zacatecas, Mexico
- Tuli Solar, Mazapil Municipality, Zacatecas, Mexico
