= Boralex =

Québécois power company

Boralex Inc.
- Company type: Public (TSX: BLX)
- Industry: Renewable energy
- Founded: 1990
- Founder: Bernard Lemaire
- Headquarters: Kingsey Falls, Quebec, Canada
- Key people: Patrick Decostre, President & CEO
- Services: Wind, hydroelectric, and solar energy production, energy storage
- Number of employees: 826
- Website: https://www.boralex.com/

Boralex is a Canadian energy production company, founded in 1990 in the province of Quebec. It develops, builds, and operates renewable energy facilities (wind, hydroelectric, solar and storage) in Canada, France, the United Kingdom, and the United States. According to the 2022 Wind Energy Observatory, the company is also the leading independent producer of onshore wind energy in France. Boralex has an installed capacity of 3.1 GW and is developing a project portfolio that exceeds 8 GW in wind, solar, and electricity storage. Boralex's shares are traded on the Toronto Stock Exchange under the symbol BLX.

== History ==
In 1990, Cascades, a Quebec company specializing in manufacturing, processing and marketing packaging products and paper mainly composed of recycled fibres, moves into the energy sector by setting up the first natural gas cogeneration plant in Canada (at Kingsey Falls, a few steps from Cascades’ head office). Through its Cascades Energy subsidiary, Cascades acquires Boralex, a joint venture founded in 1982 by a group of businesspeople. The head office is established in Kingsey Falls.

In 1997, Boralex issued its first public share offering to finalize several acquisitions and strengthen its financial position. The company ended the year with an asset portfolio of 11 power stations with a total installed capacity of 62 MW.

The next year, Boralex acquired La Rochette hydroelectric power station, its first property in France, and moved into the wood-residue thermal energy market with the acquisition of the Stratton power station in Maine.

By the end of 2001, Boralex had 200 employees and 18 sites in Québec, the United States and France, for a total installed capacity close to 350 MW generated by hydroelectric, thermal and gas- and wood-residue-fired cogeneration power stations. In November 2002, Boralex took its first step into wind power, starting up its first wind farm in Avignonet-Lauragais, France.

In the early 2000s, Boralex took its first steps in wind power production in France with the commissioning of the Avignonet-Lauragais wind farm in November 2002.

Boralex continued its expansion in the wind power industry by entering the United States in 2003 with the acquisition of five small hydroelectric power stations in New York State, with a total capacity of 23 MW, and then in Canada with the commissioning in February 2010 of the Thames River wind farm, totalling 90 MW, in Ontario.

In the late 2000s, Boralex continued to expand in the wind power market. In Canada, a consortium of Boralex and Gaz Métro Limited Partnership/Energir, with the assistance of the Séminaire de Québec, got approval for two wind power projects, including the Seigneurie de Beaupré wind farms. Seigneurie de Beaupré began operating in 2013 with a total installed capacity of 272 MW, and remains one of the largest wind sites in Canada.

At the end of 2012, Boralex terminates its natural gas cogeneration operations at Kingsey Falls, 22 years after the power station opened.

In 2014, Boralex acquires Enel Green Power France, including its plants already in operation (186 MW), those under construction (10 MW) and its 310 MW projects in development. Boralex becomes the largest independent producer of wind energy in France.

In 2017, the Caisse de dépôt et placement du Québec, one of Canada’s leading institutional investors, purchases of all Cascades’ Class A common shares, making them Boralex’s principal shareholder, with 17,3%.

The following year, Boralex acquires the Kallista Energy Investment SAS portfolio, increasing its installed capacity by 1,673 MW.

In 2020, Boralex enters the U.S. solar energy market with the announcement of an agreement to acquire interests in seven solar farms in California, Indiana and Alabama. The development of the company in the United States is ongoing. In 2022, Boralex had 1 GW of energy projects under development in the United States, including five solar farms totaling 540 MW of electric generation and 77 MW of storage selected under a request for proposals by NYSERDA, in New York State.

In early 2021, Boralex issues its first Corporate Social Responsibility Report, “Beyond Renewable Energy” to highlight the company’s environmental, social, and governance strategies to align with the United Nations’ Sustainable Development Goals.

On April 1, 2025, Boralex announced its first operational production site in the United Kingdom. The Limekiln wind farm, located near Thurso in the Caithness region, is the company's flagship project in Scotland and its very first operational site in the UK, with an installed capacity of 106 MW.

== Leadership ==
After leading the company for 14 years, Patrick Lemaire retired as CEO in 2020. He remains a member of the Board of Directors, and Patrick Decostre is appointed as his successor.

Decostre was Boralex’s first employee in Europe, where he spent 18 years building the company’s footprint and established the first onshore wind farm in France. Under his leadership, Boralex became the largest independent producer of onshore wind power in France. Most recently he served as Vice President and Chief Operating Officer based in Montreal.

Patrick Lemaire was recognized multiple times for his leadership as a CEO. He was notably named CEO of the Year, SME Category, by Les Affaires Magazine, and was ranked in the Top 100 Power People report, both in 2017.

== Strategic Plan ==
On June 18, 2019, Boralex management announced the strategic plan that will guide it to achieve the financial objectives set for 2023.

Boralex’s strategic plan sets out 4 main directions: growth (in markets with promising renewable energy programs), diversification (into solar power and energy storage), new customers (through corporate PPAs and other sources of revenues) and optimization (operational and financial). It also includes 3 financial objectives and, since February 2021, 10 corporate social responsibility (CSR) priorities.

== Apuiat ==
In February 2021, Boralex announced a partnership with the Innu Nation to establish a large-scale wind farm on territory of the Uashat mak Mani-utenam First Nation and public lands in the City of Port-Cartier, in the province of Quebec. The project, called Apuiat—meaning a paddle in Innu Aimun, a symbol of moving forward together—is expected to begin construction in the summer of 2022. The Innu communities and Boralex will equally share profits from the sale of electricity generated by the wind farm, and both host communities will receive annual royalties.

According to the preliminary schedule, the park should be commissioned in 2024.

== See also ==
- Green energy
- Renewable energy
- Sustainable energy
