= Cartier Wind Energy =

Wind farm operator in Quebec

- Type: Joint venture
- Industry: Electric generation
- Genre: Independent Power Producer
- Founded: 2004
- Headquarters: Longueuil, Quebec, Canada
- Parent: Innergex Renewable Energy
- Website: www.cartierenergie.com/en/

Cartier Wind Energy (French: Cartier Énergie éolienne) is a developer, owner and operator of wind farms in Quebec. Formed in 2004 as a partnership between TransCanada Corporation (62%) and Innergex Renewable Energy (38%), the Longueuil-based company has built 5 wind farms with a combined capacity of 589.5 MW in the Gaspé peninsula delivering power under a 20-year contract signed in 2005 with Hydro-Québec. The company's sixth project, a 150-MW wind farm in Les Méchins, Quebec, was cancelled in 2010, after Cartier failed to reach an agreement with landowners. On 24 October 2018, Innergex announced that it had completed its acquisition of TransCanada's interest in the Cartier wind farms.

== Facilities ==
Name	Location	Fuel Source	Capacity (MW)	Commissioned	Ref
Baie-des-Sables	Québec	Wind	109.5	2006	
Carleton	Québec	Wind	109.5	2008	
Gros-Morne	Québec	Wind	211.5	2011-2012	
L'Anse-à-Valleau	Québec	Wind	100.5	2007	
Montagne-Sèche	Québec	Wind	58.5	2011	

== See also ==
- List of renewable energy companies by country
