= Énergir =

Distributor of natural gas in Quebec

- Formerly: Quebec Natural Gas Corporation (1957-1969); Gaz Métropolitain (1969–2003); Gaz Métro (2003–2017)
- Type: Private
- Industry: Natural gas and electricity provider
- Founded: 1957
- Headquarters: Montreal, Quebec, Canada
- Areas served: Quebec, Vermont
- Key people: Éric Lachance (President and CEO)
- Products: Natural gas; Liquefied natural gas; Compressed natural gas; Biomethane; Wind power; Solar power; Hydroelectricity
- Total assets: over $9 billion
- Owner: CDPQ 80.9%; Fonds de solidarité FTQ 19.1%
- Number of employees: 1,490 employees (September 30, 2017)
- Subsidiaries: Gaz Métro Plus, Gaz Métro LNG, Gaz Métro Transport Solutions, Gaz Métro Energy Solutions, Standard Solar, Vermont Gas Systems, Green Mountain Power, Trans Québec & Maritimes Pipeline Inc, Champion Pipeline, Portland Natural Gas Transmission System, Intragaz, CCUM, Seigneurie de Beaupré Wind Farms
- Website: energir.com

Énergir (French: [enɛʁʒiʁ]), formerly known as Gaz Métro, is an energy company with 535,000 customers in Quebec and the northeastern United States. It is the largest natural gas distribution company in Quebec, and, through subsidiaries, also produces electricity from wind. In the United States the company operates through subsidiaries in seventeen states, where it produces electricity from hydroelectric, wind and solar sources, in addition to being the leading electricity distributor and the sole natural gas distributor in Vermont.

== Background ==
The main natural gas distributor in Québec was created during the first nationalization of electricity in Québec, in 1944. By bringing Montreal Light, Heat and Power under state control, the new Quebec Hydroelectric Commission, better known as Hydro-Québec, not only took charge of the company's electricity assets, and also acquired a gas distribution network in Greater Montreal.

Near the end of the 1940s, industrialists began planning the construction of a pipeline that would connect Alberta and the large cities of Ontario. Hydro-Québec was approached to extend the pipeline toward Montreal. Several meetings were organized, and the Quebec Hydroelectric Commission ordered internal studies and sought expert advice. In March 1954, the commissioners formed a committee to make a decision. The committee recommended replacing industrial gas with natural gas from Western Canada, a conversion that would be of some benefit to the public utility. The commission's president, L.-Eugène Potvin, instead recommended selling the gas sector to a private company. This solution was adopted and the Commission resolved to divest itself of all its gas assets, which was approved by the Duplessis government. Negotiations began with several groups and the sale of the network to the Quebec Natural Gas Corporation was concluded in the spring of 1957.

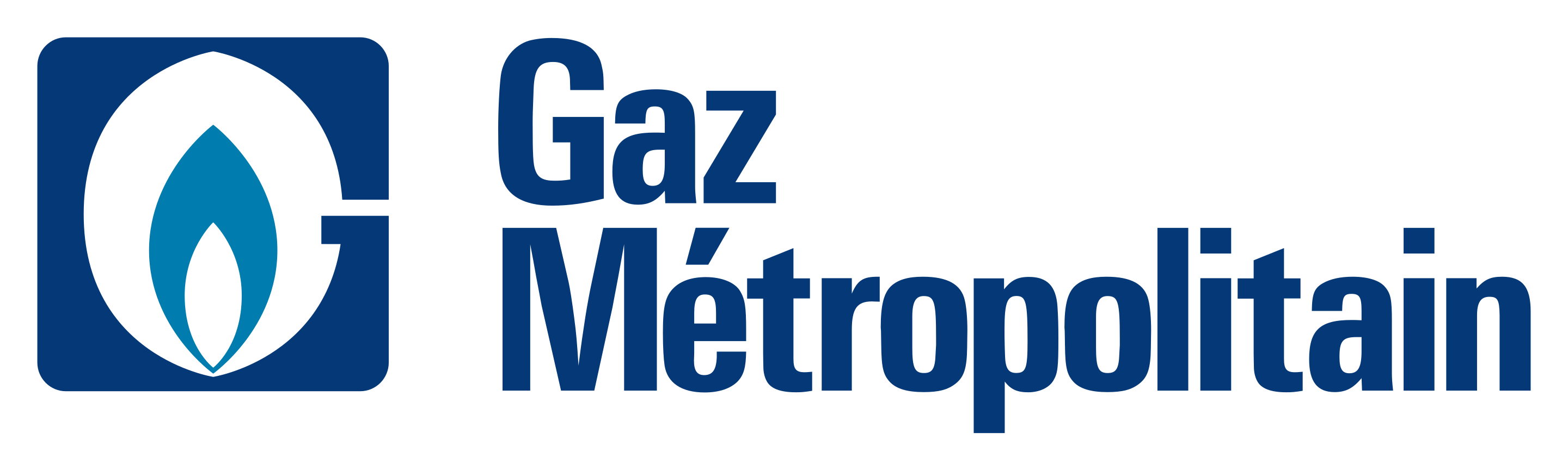
Gaz Métropolitain logo from 1969 until 2003

In 1969, the company was renamed Gaz Métropolitain. Its liquefaction plant was inaugurated on October 7, 1969.

In 1985, the company acquired Gaz Inter-Cité Québec (which served eastern Québec) and Gaz Provincial du Nord (which served Abitibi-Témiscamingue). It became a subsidiary of Noverco.

In 1986, Gaz Métro acquired Vermont Gas Systems, which distributes all the natural gas in Vermont.

On January 1, 1997, almost 40 years after removing itself from the natural gas sector, Hydro-Québec returned to the sector by acquiring a 42% stake in Noverco, the holding company that controls Gaz Métro. As such, Hydro-Québec was once again under the control of André Caillé, who left the position of President and CEO three months later to become the head of the Québec state company. This move was part of Mr. Caillé's convergence strategy to transform Québec into an energy hub in the northeastern part of the North American continent.

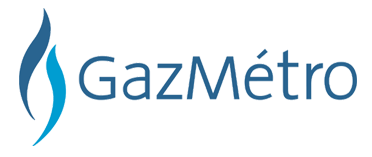
Gaz Métro logo from 2003 until 2017

In 2003, Gaz Metropolitain was abridged to Gaz Métro, accompanied by a new logo.

In 2004, Hydro-Québec sold its shares of Noverco to the Caisse de dépôt et placement du Québec. Trencap thus became the majority shareholder in Gaz Métro.

In 2007, Gaz Métro acquired Green Mountain Power, which distributes 70% of the electricity in Vermont. That same year, Sophie Brochu became president and chief executive officer of Gaz Métro.

In 2010, Gaz Métro was restructured so that 71% of its capital was held by the private company Noverco, which was controlled by Trencap (61.11%) and Enbridge (38.9%), while 29% was owned by the new company Valener, listed on the TSX.

In July 2011, ahead of Fortis, Gaz Métro acquired Central Vermont Public Service Corp., "the largest electricity supplier in Vermont," for US$472 million.

CVPS operations were merged with those of GMP in 2012. This made GMP the largest electric utility in the state, providing electricity to over 75 percent of Vermont residents.

On November 29, 2017, Gaz Métro was renamed Énergir to reflect its wider energy portfolio.

On September 27, 2019, Noverco closed a $1.2 billion tender offer for all Valener shares, valuing Energir at approximately $4.1 billion, and returning Energir to private ownership.

On June 7, 2021, Enbridge announced the sale of its shares in Energir to Trencap for $1.14 billion, again valuing Energir at approximately $4.1 billion. Following this transaction, CDPQ and Fonds de Solidarité FTQ own 80.9% and 19.1%, respectively, of Trencap, which is the sole owner of Noverco, which owns 100% of Energir's shares.

== Activities ==
=== Natural gas ===
==== Natural gas distribution ====
Énergir distributes approximately 97% of the gas consumed in Québec. Its underground network spans more than 10,000 km (6,200 mi) and serves more than 205,000 customers. Énergir's subsidiary Vermont Gas Systems is the sole gas distributor in the state of Vermont. It serves over 50,000 customers.

==== Liquefied natural gas (LNG) ====
Over the last few years, Gaz Métro has developed its liquefied natural gas (LNG) subsidiary for heavy and maritime transportation, and for serving industries in regions far from the natural gas network. LNG comes from Gaz Métro's liquefaction, storage and regasification (LSR) plant in Montréal East, in operation since 1969.

In 2014, the Québec government (through Investissement Québec) and Gaz Métro teamed up to increase accessibility to liquefied natural gas, starting in 2017, by increasing the capacities of Énergir's natural gas liquefaction plant. The addition of a second liquefaction train will increase production from 3 billion to 9 billion cubic feet per year.

==== Compressed natural gas (CNG) ====
Compressed natural gas (CNG) has exactly the same properties as natural gas in its gaseous state. However, it can be stored at 300 times atmospheric pressure, which reduces the volume by an equal amount. Transported in high pressure tanks, it is mostly used for short-range daily trips.

==== Biomethane (renewable natural gas) ====
Biomethane is a renewable and carbon-neutral energy with the same properties as regular natural gas, and it is produced from organic material. Saint-Hyacinthe became the first municipality in Québec to produce energy through biomethanation, and several projects are now being developed elsewhere in the province of Quebec.

=== Electricity ===
==== United States ====
Green Mountain Power (GMP), a subsidiary of Énergir, is the largest electricity distributor in Vermont, serving over 70% of the market and near 265,000 customers. GMP's core business includes the distribution, transportation, generation, purchase and sale of electricity in Vermont and, to a lesser degree, electricity transportation in New Hampshire and electricity generation in the states of New York, Maine and Connecticut.

The GMP network comprises over 1,600 miles (2,600 km) of overhead transmission lines, 10,100 miles (16,300 km) of overhead distribution lines and 1,000 miles (1,600 km) of underground distribution lines, located mainly in Vermont but also extending to New Hampshire and New York.

Green Mountain Power generates a portion of the electricity it distributes but most of its supply is purchased from other producers. Its supply portfolio comprises several sources of power generation, including wind power, solar power and hydroelectricity. GMP also buys electricity produced with "cow power," a process that uses methane from the manure of dairy cattle to generate clean energy.

In March 2017, Énergir announced the acquisition, through one of its subsidiaries, of Standard Solar, Inc. a leading solar energy firm specializing in the development and installation of commercial solar electric systems in many states across the United States. Based in Rockville, Maryland, Standard Solar is a commercial, industrial and institutional solar developer, engineering, procurement and construction management, as well as operations and maintenance services provider operating in multiple states in the United States.

==== Québec ====
The Seigneurie de Beaupré Wind Farms are an equal-share joint venture of Boralex and Beaupré Éole, which is, in turn, 51%-owned by Gaz Métro and 49%-owned by Valener. The core business of this joint venture consists in owning and operating these wind farms. The first phase includes two wind farms with an installed capacity of 272 megawatts. These wind farms were put into commercial service in the first quarter of fiscal 2014. The second phase has an installed capacity of 68 megawatts and was put into commercial service on December 1, 2014.

All of the electricity generated is sold to Hydro-Québec under a 20-year contract.
