= Henvey Inlet 2 =

First Nations Reserve in Ontario, Canada

- Indian reserve
- Henvey Inlet 2 Indian Reserve
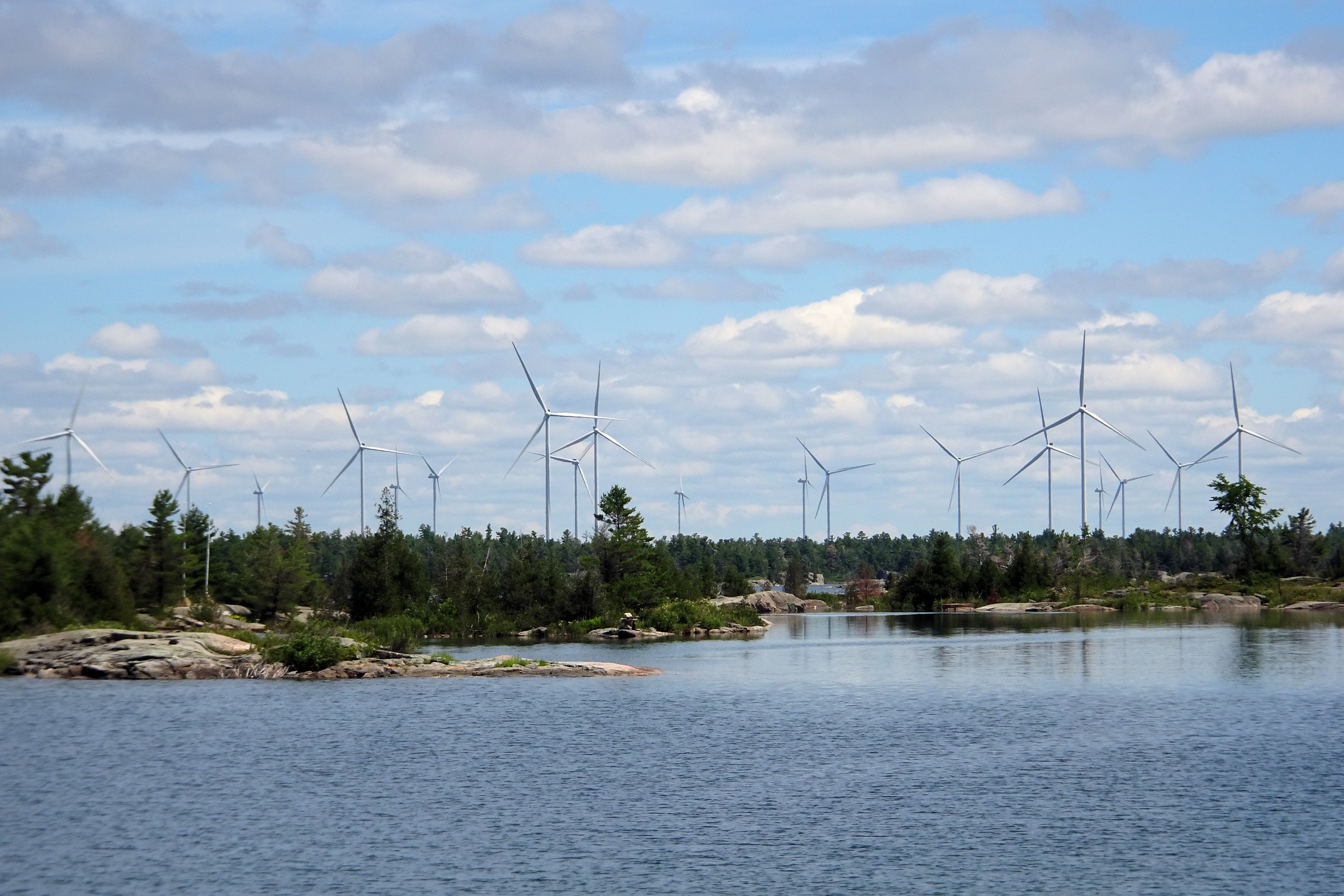
- Henvey Inlet reserve as seen from Georgian Bay

- Location within Southern Ontario
- Coordinates: 45°51′N 80°39′W
- Country: Canada
- Province: Ontario
- District: Parry Sound

Government
  - Body: Henvey Inlet First Nation

Area
  - Total: 96.13 km^{2} (37.12 sq mi)
  - Land: 85.96 km^{2} (33.19 sq mi)

Population (2016)
  - Total: 5
  - Density: 0.1/km^{2} (0.26/sq mi)
- Website: www.hifn.ca

Henvey Inlet 2 is a First Nations reserve in Parry Sound District, Ontario, on the northeastern shore of Georgian Bay. It is one of two reserves of the Henvey Inlet First Nation.

The reserve is home to 87 Vestas wind turbines with a total capacity of 300 MW. Construction started in August 2017 and operation began in July 2019.

== Demographics ==
Canada census – Henvey Inlet 2 community profile

	2021	2016	2011
Population	15 (+200.0% from 2016)	5 (-82.1% from 2011)	28 (86.7% from 2006)
Land area	84.54 km^{2} (32.64 sq mi)	85.96 km^{2} (33.19 sq mi)	85.62 km^{2} (33.06 sq mi)
Population density	0.2/km^{2} (0.52/sq mi)	0.1/km^{2} (0.26/sq mi)	0.3/km^{2} (0.78/sq mi)
Median age	0.0 (M: , F: )
Private dwellings	7 (total) 7 (occupied)	8 (total)	31 (total)
Median household income

References: 2021 2016 2011

Historical census populations
Year	Pop.	±%
1996	21	—
2001	15	−28.6%
2006	15	+0.0%
2011	28	+86.7%
2016	5	−82.1%
