= List of natural gas-fired power stations in Canada =

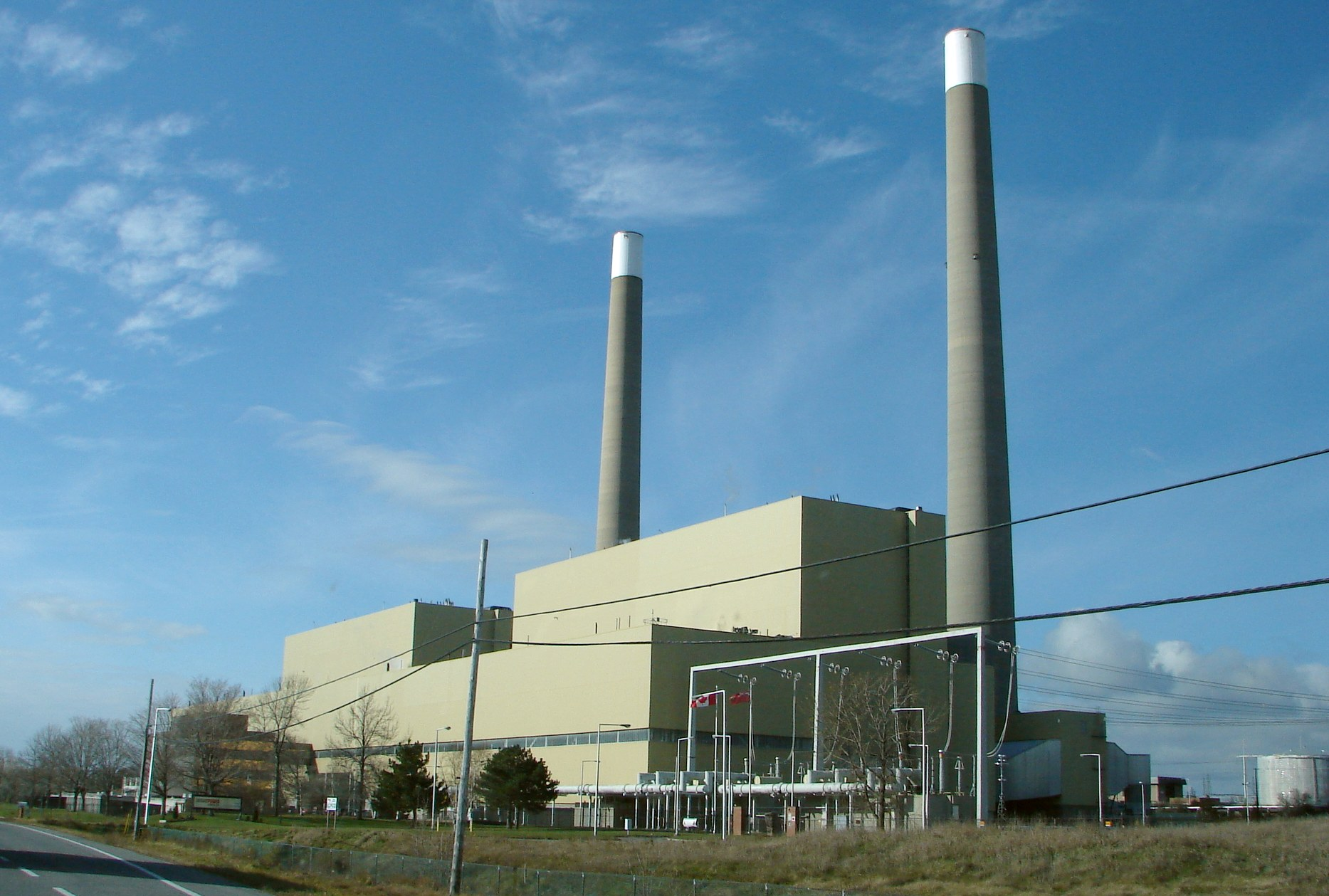
Lennox Generating Station, the largest natural gas-fired power station in Canada

This is a list of all natural gas-fired power stations in Canada. There are 39 power stations in operation as of February 2020.

Ontario has the highest number, with 12 power stations scattered across the province, followed by Saskatchewan with ten and Alberta with nine. The number of natural gas-fired power stations in Alberta is expected to overtake that of all other provinces as coal-fired power stations in the province are converted to natural gas.

== Natural gas-fired power stations ==
| Name | Province | Coordinates | Capacity (MW) | Owner | Fuel type | Ref |
|---|---|---|---|---|---|---|
| Balzac | Alberta | 51.18°N 113.9375°W | 120 | Nexen | Natural gas | |
| Battle River | Alberta | 52°28′08″N 112°08′02″W | 540 | Heartland Generation | Natural gas | |
| Bayside | New Brunswick | 45°16′30″N 66°01′36″W | 280 | NB Power | Natural gas | |
| Bécancour (Hydro-Québec) | Quebec | 46°23′31″N 72°21′8″W | 411 | Hydro-Québec | Natural gas | |
| Bécancour (TC Energy) | Quebec | 46°22′2″N 72°24′15″W | 550 | TC Energy | Natural gas | |
| Brandon | Manitoba | 49°50′44″N 99°53′16″W | 263 | Manitoba Hydro | Natural gas | |
| Brighton Beach | Ontario | 42°16′47″N 83°05′42″W | 580 | ATCO Power (50%); OPG (50%) | Natural gas | |
| Calgary | Alberta | 51°10′49″N 113°56′12″W | 300 | Enmax | Natural gas | |
| Cavalier | Alberta | 51.0069°N 113.1924°W | 120 | Enmax | Natural gas | |
| Cory | Saskatchewan | 52°5′37″N 106°52′3″W | 249 | ATCO Power (50%); SaskPower (50%) | Natural gas | |
| Ermine | Saskatchewan | 51°51′28″N 109°02′00″W | 92 | SaskPower | Natural gas | |
| Fort Nelson | British Columbia | 58.7239°N 122.701°W | 47 | BC Hydro | Natural gas | |
| Fort Saskatchewan | Alberta | 53°44′10″N 113°10′24″W | 118 | Strongwater Energy (70%); TransAlta (30%) | Natural gas | |
| Genesee | Alberta | 53°20′35″N 114°18′11″W | 1,857 | Capital Power (83.3%); TransAlta (16.7%) | Natural gas | |
| Goreway | Ontario | 43°44′46″N 79°40′48″W | 839 | Sithe Global Power | Natural gas | |
| GTAA | Ontario | 43°41′30″N 79°36′36.6″W | 117 | GTAA | Natural gas | |
| Greenfield | Ontario | 42°45′44″N 82°27′09″W | 1,005 | Calpine (50%); Mitsui (50%) | Natural gas | |
| Halton Hills | Ontario | 43°33′41″N 79°50′42″W | 683 | OPG | Natural gas | |
| H.R. Milner | Alberta | 54°00′26″N 119°06′12″W | 300 | Maxim Power | Natural gas | |
| Island | British Columbia | 50°04′08″N 125°16′55″W | 275 | Capital Power (Note: Leased to Capital Power by BC Hydro until April 2022.) | Natural gas | |
| Joffre | Alberta | 52°18′24″N 113°33′16″W | 480 | Heartland Generation (40%); Capital Power (40%); NOVA Chemicals (20%) | Natural gas | |
| Landis | Saskatchewan | 52°11′57″N 108°27′6″W | 94 | SaskPower | Natural gas | |
| Lennox | Ontario | 44°8′46″N 76°51′9″W | 2,100 | OPG | Natural gas or fuel oil | |
| Mackay River | Alberta | 57.0394°N 111.907°W | 165 | TransCanada Energy | Natural gas | |
| McMahon | British Columbia | 56°8′53″N 120°40′3″W | 120 | Enbridge, Heartland Generation | Natural gas | |
| Meadow Lake | Saskatchewan | 54°7′50″N 108°25′21″W | 44 | SaskPower | Natural gas | |
| Medicine Hat | Alberta | 50°02′29″N 110°43′22″W | 299 | City of Medicine Hat | Natural gas | |
| Meridian | Saskatchewan | 53°15′34″N 109°57′04″W | 228 | Stanley Energy | Natural gas | |
| Muskeg River Mine | Alberta | 57°15′23″N 111°30′23″W | 170 | Heartland Generation | Natural gas | |
| Nipigon | Ontario | 49.294°N 88.1°W | 40 | Atlantic Power Corporation | Natural gas | |
| North Battleford | Saskatchewan | 52°41′00″N 108°10′18″W | 260 | Northland Power | Natural gas | |
| North Bay | Ontario | 46.3803°N 79.4693°W | 40 | Atlantic Power Corporation | Natural gas | |
| Ottawa | Ontario | 45.4019°N 75.6557°W | 68 | TransAlta | Natural gas | |
| Portlands | Ontario | 43°38′58″N 79°19′51″W | 550 | OPG | Natural gas | |
| Prince Rupert | British Columbia | 54.25616°N 130.2273°W | 46 | BC Hydro | Natural gas | |
| Queen Elizabeth | Saskatchewan | 52°5′43″N 106°42′22″W | 634 | SaskPower | Natural gas | |
| St. Clair | Ontario | 42°53′47″N 82°23′54″W | 577 | Invenergy | Natural gas | |
| Sarnia Regional | Ontario | 42°56′04″N 82°26′17″W | 506 | TransAlta | Natural gas | |
| Scotford | Alberta | 53°48′12″N 113°6′6″W | 170 | Heartland Generation | Natural gas | |
| Selkirk | Manitoba | 50°8′03″N 96°51′05″W | 126 | Manitoba Hydro | Natural gas | |
| Shepard | Alberta | 50°58′15″N 113°53′07″W | 800 | Capital Power (50%); ENMAX (50%) | Natural gas | |
| Spy Hill | Saskatchewan | 50°35′56″N 101°50′52″W | 86 | Northland Power | Natural gas | |
| Success | Saskatchewan | 50°25′45″N 108°09′39″W | 30 | SaskPower | Natural gas | |
| Thorold | Ontario | 43°06′25″N 79°11′55″W | 265 | Northland Power | Natural gas | |
| Tufts Cove | Nova Scotia | 44°40′35″N 63°35′46″W | 415 | Nova Scotia Power | Fuel oil (71%); Natural gas (29%) | |
| Valleyview | Alberta | | 100 | Heartland Generation | Natural gas | |
| Warden | Ontario | 43°50′53″N 79°19′57″W | 7 | Markham District Energy | Natural gas | |
| Yellowhead | Saskatchewan | 52°43′24″N 108°13′54″W | 138 | SaskPower | Natural gas | |
| York | Ontario | 44°04′32″N 79°31′54″W | 383 | Capital Power (50%); Unknown (50%) | Natural gas | |
| Houweling Nurseries Cogeneration | British Columbia | Delta | 9 | Houweling's Tomatoes | Natural gas | |

== See also ==
- List of power stations in Canada by type
