= List of largest power stations in Canada =

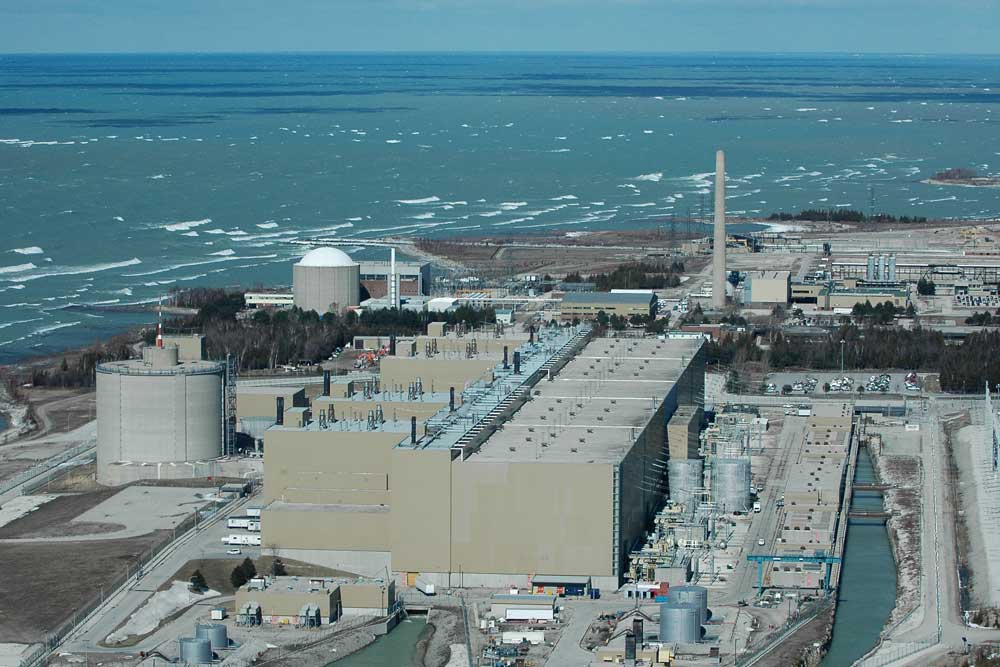
Bruce Nuclear Generating Station in Bruce County, Ontario

This article lists the largest electrical generating stations in Canada in terms of current installed electrical capacity. Non-renewable power stations are those that run on coal, fuel oils, nuclear, natural gas, oil shale and peat, while renewable power stations run on fuel sources such as biomass, geothermal heat, hydro, solar energy, solar heat, tides, waves and wind.

As of 2023 the largest power generating facility is the Bruce Nuclear Generating Station in Ontario and has an installed capacity of 6,610 MW.

== Largest power stations ==
List of the electrical generating facilities in Canada with a current installed capacity of at least 250 MW.

Rank	Name	Province	Startup	Location	Capacity (MW)	Annual generation (GWh)	Type	Owner	Ref
1	Bruce Nuclear (Note: To be uprated with a target capacity of 7,000 MW by mid-2033.)	Ontario	1977	44°19′31″N 81°35′58″W	6,610	48,169	Nuclear (PHWR)	Bruce Power	
2	Robert-Bourassa	Quebec	1979	53°46′55″N 77°31′58″W	5,616	31,000	Hydro (underground)	Hydro-Québec	
3	Churchill Falls (Note: To be upgraded to 7,803 MW by 2035.)	Newfoundland and Labrador	1971	53°31′32″N 63°57′25″W	5,428	35,000	Hydro (underground)	NL Hydro	
4	Darlington Nuclear (Note: Refurbishment to be completed by 2026.)	Ontario	1990	43°52′22″N 78°43′11″W	3,512	28,000	Nuclear (PHWR)	OPG	
5	Pickering Nuclear (Note: To be upgraded by mid-2030s.)	Ontario	1971	43°48′42″N 79°03′57″W	3,094	20,000	Nuclear (PHWR)	OPG	
6	Gordon M. Shrum	British Columbia	1968	56°0′58″N 122°12′19″W	2,907	15,000	Hydro	BC Hydro	
7	Mica	British Columbia	1973	52°4′35″N 118°34′0″W	2,805	7,202	Hydro	BC Hydro	
8	La Grande-4	Quebec	1984	53°53′12″N 73°27′55″W	2,779	14,600	Hydro	Hydro-Québec	
9	Revelstoke Dam	British Columbia	1984	51°3′15″N 118°11′40″W	2,480	7,800	Hydro	BC Hydro	
10	La Grande-3	Quebec	1984	53°43′40″N 75°59′55″W	2,418	12,300	Hydro	Hydro-Québec	
11	Lennox	Ontario	1976	44°8′46″N 76°51′9″W	2,140	50	Natural gas or Fuel oil	OPG	
12	La Grande-2-A	Quebec	1992	53°46′46″N 77°32′57″W	2,106	11,600	Hydro	Hydro-Québec	
13	Sundance	Alberta	1970	53°30′27″N 114°33′26″W	1,861	?	Natural gas	TransAlta	
14	Beauharnois	Quebec	1961	45°18′51″N 73°54′37″W	1,853	11,700	Hydro (ROR)	Hydro-Québec	
15	Daniel-Johnson	Quebec	1970	50°38′23″N 68°43′37″W	1,596	7,400	Hydro	Hydro-Québec	
16	Sir Adam Beck II	Ontario	1954	43°08′45″N 79°02′41″W	1,516	2,149	Hydro	OPG	
17	La Grande-1	Quebec	1995	53°44′04″N 78°34′26″W	1,436	7,900	Hydro (ROR)	Hydro-Québec	
18	Genesee	Alberta	1989	53°20′35″N 114°18′11″W	1,376	?	Natural gas	Capital Power (83.3%); TransAlta (16.7%)	
19	Limestone	Manitoba	1990	56°30′25″N 94°6′25″W	1,350	9,000	Hydro (ROR)	Manitoba Hydro	
20	René-Lévesque	Quebec	1976	49°44′25″N 68°35′34″W	1,326	5,400	Hydro (ROR)	Hydro-Québec	
21	Jean-Lesage	Quebec	1967	49°19′18″N 68°20′49″W	1,229	?	Hydro (ROR)	Hydro-Québec	
22	Kettle	Manitoba	1973	56°23′3″N 94°37′54″W	1,220	8,500	Hydro (ROR)	Manitoba Hydro	
23	Bersimis-1	Quebec	1956	49°18′31″N 69°33′50″W	1,178	?	Hydro	Hydro-Québec	
24	John Horgan	British Columbia	2024	44°08′53″N 76°50′31″W	1,100	5,100	Hydro	BC Hydro	
25	Manic-5-PA	Quebec	1989	50°38′26″N 68°44′13″W	1,064	?	Hydro	Hydro-Québec	
26	R. H. Saunders	Ontario	1958	45°00′28″N 74°47′34″W	1,045	?	Hydro	OPG	
27	Outardes-3	Quebec	1969	49°33′33″N 68°43′58″W	1,026	?	Hydro (ROR)	Hydro-Québec	
28	Greenfield	Ontario	2008	42°45′44″N 82°27′09″W	1,005	?	Natural gas	Calpine (50%); Mitsui (50%)	
29	Coleson Cove	New Brunswick	1976	45°09′13″N 66°12′11″W	1050	?	Fuel oil	NB Power	
30	Long Spruce	Manitoba	1979	56°24′1″N 94°22′10″W	980	7,100	Hydro (ROR)	Manitoba Hydro	
31	Napanee	Ontario	2020	44°08′53″N 76°50′31″W	900		Natural gas	Atura Power	
31	Shipshaw	Quebec	2002	48°26′54″N 71°12′54″W	896	?	Hydro	Rio Tinto	
32	Sainte-Marguerite-3	Quebec	2003	50°42′18″N 66°46′47″W	884	2,730	Hydro (underground)	Hydro-Québec	
33	Laforge-1	Quebec	1994	54°10′14″N 72°36′55″W	878	4,500	Hydro	Hydro-Québec	
34	Bersimis-2	Quebec	1959	49°10′02″N 69°14′26″W	869	?	Hydro (ROR)	Hydro-Québec	
35	Keephills	Alberta	1983	53°26′54″N 114°27′02″W	858	?	Natural gas	TransAlta	
36	Goreway	Ontario	2009	43°44′46″N 79°40′48″W	839	?	Natural gas	Sithe Global Power	
37	Muskrat Falls	Newfoundland and Labrador	2021	53°14′44″N 60°46′22″W	824	4,900	Hydro	NL Hydro	
38	Seven Mile	British Columbia	1979	49°1′47″N 117°30′11″W	805	3,400	Hydro	BC Hydro	
39	Shepard	Alberta	2015	50°58′15″N 113°53′07″W	868	?	Natural gas	Capital Power (50%); ENMAX (50%)	
40	Kemano	British Columbia	1954	53°33′48″N 127°56′32″W	790	?	Hydro	Rio Tinto	
41	Outardes-4	Quebec	1969	49°42′21″N 68°54′24″W	785	?	Hydro	Hydro-Québec	
42	Sheerness	Alberta	1986	51°26′32″N 111°47′32″W	780	5,500	Natural gas	Heartland Generation (50%); TransAlta (50%)	
43	Bernard-Landry	Quebec	2012	52°10′47″N 76°2′7″W	768	2,300	Hydro	Hydro-Québec	
44	Carillon	Quebec	1962	45°34′07″N 74°23′01″W	753	?	Hydro (ROR)	Hydro-Québec	
45	Chutes-des-Passes	Quebec		49°50′26″N 71°09′46″W	750	?	Hydro	Rio Tinto	
46	Keeyask	Manitoba	2021	56°20′47″N 95°12′17″W	695	4,400	Hydro	Keeyask Hydropower Limited Partnership	
47	Peace Canyon	British Columbia	1980	55°58′57″N 121°59′34″W	694	3,250	Hydro	BC Hydro	
48	Halton Hills	Ontario	2010	43°33′41″N 79°50′42″W	683	?	Natural gas	OPG	
49	Mactaquac	New Brunswick	1968	45°57′18″N 66°52′03″W	672	1,600	Hydro	NB Power	
50	Point Lepreau Nuclear (Note: A 100 MW small modular reactor was approved in December 2019. Upon completion of the reactor in 2028, Point Lepreau will have an installed capacity of 760 MW.)	New Brunswick	1983	45°04′10″N 66°27′20″W	660	4,111	Nuclear (PHWR)	NB Power	
51	Romaine-2	Quebec	2014	50°37′28″N 63°11′39″W	640	3,300	Hydro	Hydro-Québec	
52	Queen Elizabeth	Saskatchewan	1959	52°5′43″N 106°42′22″W	634	?	Natural gas	SaskPower	
53	Holyrood (Note: To be upgraded to 795.5 MW by 2031.)	Newfoundland and Labrador	1971	47°27′10″N 53°05′43″W	624.5	2,996	Fuel oil (80%); Diesel (20%)	NL Hydro	
54	Lingan	Nova Scotia	1979	46°14′12″N 60°2′14″W	620	2,288	Coal	Nova Scotia Power	
55	Bay d'Espoir (Note: To be upgraded to 767.4 MW by 2031.)	Newfoundland and Labrador	1967	47°59′25″N 55°47′59″W	613.4	2,657	Hydro	NL Hydro	
56	Kootenay Canal	British Columbia	1976	49°27′10″N 117°30′55″W	583	2,482	Hydro	BC Hydro	
57	Poplar River (Note: To be decommissioned by 2030.)	Saskatchewan	1981	49°3′27″N 105°28′59″W	582	?	Coal	SaskPower	
58	Brighton Beach	Ontario	2004	42°16′47″N 83°05′42″W	580	?	Natural gas	ATCO Power (50%); OPG (50%)	
59	St. Clair	Ontario	2009	42°53′47″N 82°23′54″W	577	?	Natural gas	Invenergy	
60	Bécancour (TC Energy)	Quebec	2006	46°22′2″N 72°24′15″W	550	?	Natural gas	TC Energy	
60	Portlands	Ontario	2008	43°38′58″N 79°19′51″W	550	?	Natural gas	OPG	
61	Battle River	Alberta	1969	52°28′08″N 112°08′02″W	540	?	Natural gas	ATCO Power	
62	Boundary Dam	Saskatchewan	1959	49°5′47″N 103°1′49″W	531	?	Coal	SaskPower	
63	Toulnustouc	Quebec	2005	49°58′14″N 68°09′34″W	526	2,600	Hydro	Hydro-Québec	
64	Outardes-2	Quebec	1978	49°08′59″N 68°24′17″W	523	?	Hydro (ROR)	Hydro-Québec	
65	Sarnia Regional	Ontario	2006	42°56′04″N 82°26′17″W	506	?	Natural gas	TransAlta	
66	Waneta	British Columbia	1954	49°00′15″N 117°36′43″W	490	1,980	Hydro	Teck (67%); BC Hydro (33%)	
67	Eastmain-1	Quebec	2012	52°10′54″N 76°03′05″W	480	2,700	Hydro	Hydro-Québec	
67	Joffre	Alberta	2000	52°18′24″N 113°33′16″W	480	?	Natural gas	Heartland Generation (40%); Capital Power (40%); NOVA Chemicals (20%)	
68	Grand Rapids	Manitoba	1957	53°9′29″N 99°17′33″W	479	2,320	Hydro	Manitoba Hydro	
69	Bridge River	British Columbia	1948	50°43′54″N 122°14′33″W	478	2,500	Hydro	BC Hydro	
70	Brisay	Quebec	1993	54°27′16″N 70°31′09″W	469	2,300	Hydro	Hydro-Québec	
71	Travers	Alberta	2022	50°15′16″N 112°43′51″W	465	?	photovoltaic	Greengate Power	
72	Belledune	New Brunswick	1993	47°54′21″N 65°51′48″W	458	?	Coal	NB Power	
72	Sir Adam Beck I	Ontario	1922	43°08′57″N 79°02′40″W	446	3,040 (Note: Estimated from the published total annual generation of the two Sir Adam Beck stations, weighted by their relative nameplate capacities)	Hydro	OPG	
73	Des Joachims	Ontario	1950	46°10′52″N 77°41′45″W	429	?	Hydro	OPG	
74	Tufts Cove	Nova Scotia	1965	44°40′35″N 63°35′46″W	415	?	Fuel oil (71%); Natural gas (29%)	Nova Scotia Power	
75	Bécancour (Hydro-Québec)	Quebec		46°23′31″N 72°21′8″W	411	?	Natural gas	Hydro-Québec	
76	Isle-Maligne	Quebec	1926	48°34′37″N 71°38′05″W	402	?	Hydro	Rio Tinto	
77	York	Ontario	2012	44°04′32″N 79°31′54″W	400	?	Natural gas	Capital Power (50%); Unknown (50%)	
78	Millbank	New Brunswick	1991	47°04′26″N 65°27′19″W	399	?	Fuel oil	NB Power	
79	Romaine-3	Quebec	2017	51°07′51″N 63°24′49″W	395	?	Hydro	Hydro-Québec	
80	Péribonka	Quebec	1952	49°30′28″N 71°10′59″W	385	2,200	Hydro (ROR)	Hydro-Québec	
81	McCormick	Quebec	1952	49°11′35″N 68°19′37″W	367	?	Hydro	Hydro-Québec (60%); Alcoa (40%)	
82	Seigneurie de Beaupré	Quebec	2013	47°22′20″N 70°51′39″W	363.5	?	Wind	Boralex (50%); Énergir (46.8%); La Côte-de-Beaupré (3.2%)	
83	Brazeau	Alberta	1963	52°57′59″N 115°34′44″W	355	397	Hydro	TransAlta	
84	Rivière-du-Moulin	Quebec	2014	47°58′00″N 71°01′00″W	350	?	Wind	EDF Renewables	
85	Abitibi	Ontario	1936	49°52′40″N 81°34′15″W	349	?	Hydro	OPG	
86	Waneta Dam Expansion	British Columbia	2015	49°00′15″N 117°36′42″W	335	627.4	Hydro	Columbia Power (58%); Columbia Basin Trust (42%)	
87	Laforge-2	Quebec	1996	54°35′30″N 71°16′15″W	319	1,800	Hydro (ROR)	Hydro-Québec	
88	Trenton	Nova Scotia	1969	45°37′13″N 62°38′53″W	305	?	Coal	Nova Scotia Power	
89	Trenche	Quebec		47°45′12″N 72°52′44″W	302	?	Hydro (ROR)	Hydro-Québec	
90	Blackspring Ridge	Alberta	2014	50°08′03″N 112°54′55″W	300	?	Wind	EDF Renewables	
90	Calgary	Alberta	2003	51°10′49″N 113°56′12″W	300	?	Natural gas	Enmax	
90	Henvey Inlet	Ontario	2019	45°58′35″N 80°33′38″W	300	?	Wind	Pattern Energy	
90	Lac Alfred	Quebec	2016	48°24′51″N 67°41′15″W	300	?	Wind	EDF Renewables	
93	La Tuque	Quebec	1955	47°26′39″N 72°47′58″W	294	?	Hydro (ROR)	Hydro-Québec	
94	E.B. Campbell	Saskatchewan	1963	53°41′19″N 103°20′47″W	288	900	Hydro	SaskPower	
95	Kelsey	Manitoba	1961	56°2′21″N 96°31′54″W	287	1,970	Hydro (ROR)	Manitoba Hydro	
96	Bayside	New Brunswick	1999	45°16′30″N 66°01′36″W	284	?	Natural gas	NB Power	
97	Shand	Saskatchewan	1992	49°5′16″N 102°51′49″W	276	?	Coal	SaskPower	
98	Island	British Columbia	2002	50°04′08″N 125°16′55″W	275	?	Natural gas	Capital Power	
99	Lower Notch	Ontario	1971	47°08′20″N 79°27′15″W	274	?	Hydro	OPG	
100	Beaumont	Quebec	1959	47°33′20″N 72°50′12″W	270	?	Hydro (ROR)	Hydro-Québec	
100	Romaine-1	Quebec	2015	50°23′01″N 63°15′37″W	270	?	Hydro (ROR)	Hydro-Québec	
102	Smoky Falls	Ontario	1931	50°03′40″N 82°09′41″W	267	?	Hydro	OPG (75%); Moose Cree (25%)	
103	Thorold	Ontario	2010	43°06′25″N 79°11′55″W	265	?	Natural gas	Northland Power	
104	Brandon	Manitoba	1958	49°50′44″N 99°53′16″W	263	?	Natural gas	Manitoba Hydro	
105	North Battleford	Saskatchewan	2013	52°41′00″N 108°10′18″W	260	?	Natural gas	Northland Power	
106	Nipawin	Saskatchewan	1985	53°19′11″N 104°2′31″W	255	?	Hydro	SaskPower	

== Largest power stations under construction ==
List of the electrical generating facilities under construction in Canada with an expected installed capacity of at least 250 MW.

Rank	Name	Province	Location	Capacity (MW)	Type	Owner	Year	Ref
1	Gull Island	Newfoundland and Labrador	52°57′54″N 61°22′24″W	2,700	Hydro	NL Hydro	2034	
2	Churchill Falls upgrade (Note: Upgrade to the 11 existing turbine‑generator units.)	Newfoundland and Labrador	53°31′32″N 63°57′25″W	1,275	Hydro	NL Hydro	2035	
3	Churchill Falls extension (Note: Expansion to construct a two unit powerhouse at the tailrace.)	Newfoundland and Labrador	53°31′03.6″N 63°59′03.6″W	1,100	Hydro	NL Hydro	2035	
4	Magpie-2	Quebec	50.323611°N 64.45527°W	450	Hydro	Hydro Quebec	2026	
4	Napanee expansion	Ontario	44°08′53″N 76°50′31″W	430	Natural gas turbine	Atura Power	2028	
5	Darlington New Nuclear	Ontario	43°52′22″N 78°43′11″W	300	Nuclear (SMR)	OPG	2029	

== Largest decommissioned power stations ==
List of former electrical generating facilities in Canada that had an installed capacity of at least 250 MW at the time of their decommissioning. Only facilities that have permanently shut down all of their electricity generating units are included.

Name	Image	Province	Location	Capacity (MW)	Type	Owner	Years	Years in service	Smokestack configuration
Nanticoke		Ontario	42°48′0″N 80°3′1″W	3,964	Coal	OPG	1973-2013	40 years	198 m (650 ft) ×2
Lakeview		Ontario	43°34′16″N 79°33′6″W	2,400	Coal	OPG	1962-2005	43 years	150 m (492 ft) ×4
Lambton		Ontario	42°47′50″N 82°28′10″W	1,976	Coal	OPG	1969-2013	44 years	168 m (550 ft) ×3
Hearn		Ontario	43°38.730′N 79°20.105′W	1,200	Coal	OPG	1951-1983	32 years	215 m (705 ft) ×1
Gentilly Nuclear		Quebec	46°23′45″N 72°21′25″W	925	Nuclear (SGHWR, PHWR)	Hydro-Québec	1983-2012	29 years	N/A
Burrard		British Columbia	49°17′56″N 122°53′25″W	950	natural gas	BC Hydro	1962-2016	54 years	N/A
Wabamun		Alberta	53°33′30″N 114°29′17″W	582	Coal	TransAlta	1956-2010	54 years	156 (512 ft) ×3
Dalhousie		New Brunswick	48.051919°N 66.370770°W	315	Coal	NB Power	1967-2012	45 years	167 m (551 ft) & 162 m (532 ft)
Thunder Bay		Ontario	48°21′36″N 89°13′12″W	306	Coal (1963-2014); Biomass (2015-2018)	OPG	1963-2018	55 years	198 m (650 ft) & 107 m (350 ft)

== See also ==
- List of largest power stations in the world
- List of power stations in Canada by type
- Electricity sector in Canada
- Energy policy of Canada
