= List of generating stations in Ontario =

This is a list of electrical generating stations in Ontario, Canada.

== Nuclear ==
Nuclear power accounts for roughly 60% of Ontario's power generation, and represents the baseload of its power supply. The government plans to maintain nuclear power's role in energy generation through to 2025. Ontario currently has 18 nuclear units in operation. These reactors amount to 11,400 MW of generation capacity and are located at three sites. The stations were constructed by the provincial Crown corporation, Ontario Hydro. In April 1999 Ontario Hydro was split into five component Crown corporations with Ontario Power Generation (OPG) taking over all electrical generating stations.

Name	Location	Capacity (MW)	Date	Owner	Ref
Bruce Nuclear Generating Station	44°19′31″N 81°35′58″W	6,550		Ontario Power Generation (operated under contract by Bruce Power)	
Darlington Nuclear Generating Station	43°52′22″N 78°43′11″W	3,524		Ontario Power Generation	
Pickering Nuclear Generating Station	43°48′42″N 79°03′57″W	3,100		Ontario Power Generation	
Total		13,174			

== Fossil fuel ==
List of all fossil fuel generating stations in Ontario.

Name	Location	Capacity (MW)	Date	Owner	Type	Ref
Essar Cogeneration Facility	46°31′21″N 84°21′32″W	63.0	June 13, 2009	Algoma Energy LP	Blast Furnace Gas	
Brighton Beach Generating Station	Windsor	570	July 2004	Atura Power	Natural gas	
Cardinal Cogeneration Plant	Cardinal	156		Macquarie Power & Infrastructure	Natural gas	
Cochrane Cogeneration Station	Cochrane	38.3		Algonquin Power	Natural gas	
Cornwall Electric (CDH District Heating)	Cornwall	5	1995	FortisOntario Inc.	Natural gas	
Durham College District Energy	Oshawa	2.4	March 11, 2008	Durham College	Natural gas	
East Windsor Cogeneration Centre	Windsor	84	November 6, 2009	East Windsor Cogeneration LP	Natural gas	
Goreway Station	Brampton	874	June 4, 2009	Sithe Global Power Goreway ULC	Natural gas	
Greenfield Energy Centre	Courtright	1,005	October 16, 2008	Greenfield Energy Centre LP	Natural gas	
Greenfield South Power Plant	Sarnia	280	Under construction	Greenfield South Power Corporation	Natural gas	
GTAA Cogeneration Plant	Mississauga	117	February 1, 2006	GTAA	Natural gas	
Great Northern Tri-Gen Facility	Kingsville	12	Under construction	Great Northern Hydroponics	Natural gas	
Halton Hills Generating Station	Halton Hills	683	September 1. 2010	Atura Power	Natural gas	
Iroquois Falls Power Plant	Iroquois Falls	120		Northland Power	Natural gas	
Kapuskasing Power Plant	Kapuskasing	40		Atlantic Power Corporation	Natural gas	
Kingston Generating Station	Kingston	110		Northland Power	Natural gas	
Kirkland Lake Cogeneration Station	Kirkland Lake	102		Algonquin Power	Natural gas	
Lake Superior Power Facility	Sault Ste. Marie	110		Brookfield Renewable Power	Natural gas	
Lennox Generating Station	44°8′46″N 76°51′9″W	2,100		Ontario Power Generation	Fuel oil / natural gas	
London Cogeneration Facility	London	17	December 31, 2008	Fort Chicago	Natural gas	
Napanee Generating Station	Napanee	900	March 2020	Atura Power	Natural gas	
Nipigon Power Plant	Nipigon	40		Atlantic Power Corporation	Natural gas	
North Bay Power Plant	North Bay	40		Atlantic Power Corporation	Natural gas	
Ottawa Cogeneration Plant	Ottawa	68		TransAlta	Natural gas	
Portlands Energy Centre	Toronto	562	April 2009	Atura Power	Natural gas	
Sarnia Regional Cogeneration Plant	Sarnia	506	January 1, 2006	TransAlta	Natural gas	
St. Clair Energy Centre	St. Clair Township	577	March 30, 2009	St. Clair Power LP	Natural gas	
Sudbury District Energy Cogeneration Plant	Sudbury	5	January 1, 2006	Toromont Energy	Natural gas	
Sudbury District Energy Hospital Cogeneration Plant	Sudbury	6.7	Under construction	Toromont Energy	Natural gas	
Thorold Cogeneration Station	Thorold	265	2010	Northland Power	Natural gas	
Trent Valley Cogeneration Plant	Trenton	8.3	January 1, 2006	Sonoco	Natural gas	
Tunis Power Plant		43		Atlantic Power Corporation	Natural gas	
York Energy Centre	King	393	May 2012	York Energy Centre LP	Natural gas	
Warden Energy Centre	Markham	5	June 4, 2008	Markham District Energy	Natural gas	
Windsor Cogeneration Plant	Windsor	72	1996	TransAlta	Natural gas	
Total		9,077.7			Operational	

== Renewable ==
=== Biomass ===
List of biomass electrical generating stations in Ontario.

Name	Location	Capacity (MW)	Date	Owner	Type	Ref
Atikokan Generating Station	48°50′17″N 91°34′15″W	205	September 10, 2014	Ontario Power Generation	Biomass	
Becker Cogeneration Plant	Hornepayne	15.0	On Hold	1721027 Ontario Inc.	Biomass	
Algonquin Power Energy-from-Waste	Brampton	15.1		Algonquin Power	Biomass	
Calstock Power Plant	Hearst	35		Atlantic Power Corporation	Biomass	
Cochrane	Cochrane	42		Northland Power	Biomass	
East Landfill Gas to Energy Project	Niagara Falls	1	December 2007	Glenridge Gas Utilization Inc.	Landfill gas	
Eastview Landfill Gas Energy Plant	Guelph	2.5	August 18, 2005	Ecotricity Guelph Inc (Alectra)	Landfill gas	
Hamilton Cogeneration Plant	Hamilton	1.6	July 10, 2006	Hamilton Renewable Power Inc.	Digester gas	
Mapleward Renewable Generating Station	Thunder Bay, Ontario	3.2	July 2010	Synergy North	Landfill gas	
Trail Road Landfill Generating Facility	Ottawa	5.3	January 31, 2007	PowerTrail Inc.	Landfill gas	
Total		478.7			Operational	

=== Hydroelectric ===
List of all hydroelectric generating stations in Ontario.

Name	Location	Capacity (MW)	Date	Owner	Ref
635294 Generating Station	48°25′31″N 80°18′21″W	0.522	May 1987	635294 Ontario Inc.	
Abitibi Canyon Generating Station	49°52′40″N 81°34′15″W	349		Ontario Power Generation	
Aguasabon Station	48°47′33″N 87°6′44″W	51		Ontario Power Generation	
Alexander Station	49°9′2″N 88°20′57″W	68		Ontario Power Generation	
Andrew Generating Station	46°30′52″N 84°20′50″W	47	1938	Brookfield Renewable Power	
Appleton Hydroelectric Dam	44°15′13″N 88°24′35″W	1		TransAlta	
Arnprior Station	45°25′08″N 76°20′52″W	82	1976	Ontario Power Generation	
Aubrey Falls	Mississagi River	162	1969	Brookfield Renewable Power	
Auburn Generating Station	Peterborough	2		Ontario Power Generation	
Barrett Chute Station	45°14′43″N 76°45′36″W	176	August 6, 1942	Ontario Power Generation	
Batawa	Trent River	5		Innergex Renewable Energy	
Big Chute Station	Coldwater	10		Ontario Power Generation	
Big Eddy Station	Bala	8		Ontario Power Generation	
Bingham Chute Station	Powassan	1		Ontario Power Generation	
Bracebridge Falls	45°02′19″N 79°18′31″W	2.6		Lakeland Holding	
Brewer's Mills Generating Station	Seeley's Bay	0.9	1939	Energy Ottawa	
Brian J. Gallagher Generating Station	Almonte	4.6	2010	Mississippi River Power Corp.	
Burgess Creek (Mill Stream) Generating Station	Bala	0.14		KRIS Renewable Energy	
Burk's Falls	45°37′10″N 79°24′42″W	1.1		Lakeland Holding	
Calabogie Station	Renfrew	4	November 1917	Ontario Power Generation	
Calm Lake Generating Station	East of Atikokan	9		H2O Power LP	
Cameron Falls	Aux Sables River	4		Brookfield Renewable Power	
Cameron Falls Station	Nipigon	87		Ontario Power Generation	
Campbellford Hydroelectric Dam	Campbellford	4		Algonquin Power	
Caribou Falls Station	Caribou Falls, Kenora District	91		Ontario Power Generation	
Carmichael Falls Generating Station	Cochrane	20		Brookfield Renewable Power	
Cascade Street Generating Station	Parry Sound	3.1	2017	Lakeland Power	
Chats Falls Generating Station (Note: Units 2-5, located in Ontario are owned by OPG. Units 6-9, located in Quebec, are owned by Hydro-Québec.)	45°28′30″N 76°14′18″W	96		Ontario Power Generation	
Chaudiere #2 Generating Station	Amelia Island Ottawa	8.4	1892 by E.H. Bronson	Energy Ottawa	
Chaudiere #4 Generating Station	Ottawa	9.3	1900	Energy Ottawa	
Chenaux Station	45°35′06″N 76°40′25″W	144		Ontario Power Generation	
Coniston Station	Sudbury	5		Ontario Power Generation	
Crowe Bay Station	Trent Hills	2		Hydro One	
Current River Generating Station	Thunder Bay	0.5	January 1987	Current River Hydro Partnership	
Crystal Falls Station	Sturgeon Falls	8		Ontario Power Generation	
DeCew Falls I Generating Station	43°07′07″N 79°15′50″W	23		Ontario Power Generation	
DeCew Falls II Generating Station	43°07′08″N 79°15′41″W	144		Ontario Power Generation	
Des Joachims Station	46°10′52″N 77°41′45″W	429		Ontario Power Generation	
Dryden	Dryden	3	1986	Macquarie Power & Infrastructure	
Dunford Generating Station	Scott	45	1908	Brookfield Renewable Power	
Ear Falls Station	Ear Falls	22		Ontario Power Generation	
Elliott Chute Station	Powassan	2		Ontario Power Generation	
Eugenia Station	Grey Highlands	6		Ontario Power Generation	
Fenelon Falls Station	Trent–Severn Waterway	2.6		Shaman Power Corp	
Fort Frances GS	Fort Frances	10		H2O Power LP	
Francis H. Clergue Generating Station	Sault Ste. Marie	52		Brookfield Renewable Power	
Frankford Station	Frankford	3		Ontario Power Generation	
G.W. Rayner	Mississagi River	46		Brookfield Renewable Power	
Galetta Hydroelectric Dam	Almonte	2		TransAlta	
Gananoque Generating Station	Gananoque	0.7	1939	Energy Ottawa	
Gartshore Generating Station	Sault Ste. Marie	23		Brookfield Renewable Power	
Glen Miller	Trenton	8		Innergex Renewable Energy	
Shand Dam	Belwood Lake	0.6		Grand River Conservation Authority	
Conestogo Dam	Conestogo Lake	0.6		Grand River Conservation Authority	
Guelph Lake power plant	Guelph Lake	0.1		Grand River Conservation Authority	
Hagues Reach Generating Station	Campbellford	4		Ontario Power Generation	
Hanna Chute Generating Station	Bracebridge	1		Ontario Power Generation	
Harmon Generating Station	Kapuskasing	141		Ontario Power Generation and Moose Cree First Nation	
Harris Generating Station	Wawa	13		Brookfield Renewable Power	
Healey Falls Generating Station	Campbellford	12		Ontario Power Generation	
Heywood Generating Station	St. Catharines	6.5	September 1989	St. Catharines Hydro Generation Inc.	
High Falls (Ontario)	45°05′20″N 79°18′11″W	2.3		Lakeland Holding	
High Falls Station	Carleton Place	3		Ontario Power Generation	
Hogg Generating Station	Sault Ste. Marie	19		Brookfield Renewable Power	
Hollingsworth Generating Station	Wawa	23		Brookfield Renewable Power	
Hound Chute Generating Station	47°18′19″N 79°41′51″W	4		Ontario Power Generation	
Hurdman Dam	Mattawa	0.57		Algonquin Power	
Indian Chute Generating Station	Elk Lake	3		Ontario Power Generation	
Island Falls Generating Station-Mattagami	Smooth Rock Falls	20	Under construction	TransAlta	
Island Falls Generating Station-H2O Power	Smooth Rock Falls	40	1925	H2O Power LP	
Jones Falls Generating Station	Elgin	2.4	1949	Energy Ottawa	
Iroquois Falls Generating Station	Iroquois Falls	30		H2O Power LP	
Kagawong Generating Station	Kagawong	0.75		Oakville Hydro Energy Services	
Kakabeka Generating Station	Oliver Paipoonge	25		Ontario Power Generation	
Kenora Generating Station	Kenora	8		H2O Power LP	
Kingston Mills Generating Station	Kingston	1.9	1915	Energy Ottawa	
Kipling Generating Station	Kapuskasing	233		Ontario Power Generation and Moose Cree First Nation	
Lac-Seul Station	Ear Falls	12		Ontario Power Generation	
Lakefield Generating Station	Lakefield	12		Ontario Power Generation	
Little Long Generating Station	Kapuskasing	133		Ontario Power Generation and Moose Cree First Nation	
London Street Dam	Peterborough	4.1		Peterborough Utilities	
Long-Sault Rapids Dam	Cochrane	16		Algonquin Power	
Lower Notch Generating Station	47°08′21″N 79°27′15″W	274		Ontario Power Generation	
Lower Sturgeon Generating Station	Timmins	14		Ontario Power Generation	
MacKay Generating Station	Sault Ste. Marie	62		Brookfield Renewable Power	
Manitou Station	Ear Falls	73		Ontario Power Generation	
Marmora Dam	Marmora	1		Shaman Power Corp	
Matabitchuan Generating Station	47°07′24″N 79°29′41″W	10		Ontario Power Generation	
Matthias Generating Station	Bracebridge	2.95	1950	Orillia Power Generation	
McPhail Generating Station	Wawa	13		Brookfield Renewable Power	
McVittie Generating Station	Sudbury	3		Ontario Power Generation	
Merrickville Generating Station	Smiths Falls	2		Ontario Power Generation	
Meyersburg Generating Station	Campbellford	5		Ontario Power Generation	
Minden Generating Station	Minden	4	1934	Orillia Power Generation	
Misema Hydroelectric Dam	Marter Township	3	2003	TransAlta	
Mission Generating Station	Wawa	16		Brookfield Renewable Power	
Moose Rapids Hydroelectric Dam	Sudbury	1		TransAlta	
Mountain Chute Station	Greater Madawaska	170	November 11, 1967	Ontario Power Generation	
Nairn Falls Dam and Generating Plant	Nairn and Hyman	4.75	1915	Vale Limited	
Nipissing Station	Nipissing	2		Ontario Power Generation	
Norman Generating Station	Norman	10		H2O Power LP	
Otter Rapids Generating Station	50°10′52″N 81°38′08″W	182		Ontario Power Generation	
Otto Holden Station	46°22′42″N 78°43′43″W	243		Ontario Power Generation	
Pine Portage Station	Nipigon	142		Ontario Power Generation	
R. H. Saunders Station	45°00′28″N 74°47′34″W	1,045		Ontario Power Generation	
Ragged Chute Hydroelectric Dam	47°16′35″N 79°40′21″W	7		TransAlta	
Ragged Rapids Generating Station	Bala	8		Ontario Power Generation	
Rankine power station (Note: Decommissioned.)	43°04′28″N 79°04′43″W			Niagara Parks Commission	
Ranney Falls Generating Station	Campbellford	10		Ontario Power Generation	
Red Rock Falls	Mississagi River	41		Brookfield Renewable Power	
Robert A. Dunford Generating Station	Wawa	45		Brookfield Renewable Power	
Sandy Falls Generating Station	Timmins	5.5	1911–2010	Ontario Power Generation	
Scott Falls Generating Station	Wawa	22		Brookfield Renewable Power	
Serpent River	Serpent River	7		Brookfield Renewable Power	
Seymour Generating Station	Campbellford	6		Ontario Power Generation	
Shekak Generating Station	Hearst	19		Brookfield Renewable Power	
Sidney Generating Station	Trenton	4		Ontario Power Generation	
Sills Island Generating Station	Frankford	2		Ontario Power Generation	
Silver Falls Station	Thunder Bay	48		Ontario Power Generation	
Sir Adam Beck I Generating Station	43°08′57″N 79°02′40″W	446		Ontario Power Generation	
Sir Adam Beck II Generating Station	43°08′45″N 79°02′41″W	1,499		Ontario Power Generation	
Sir Adam Beck Pump Generating Station	43°08′40″N 79°03′36″W	174		Ontario Power Generation	
Smoky Falls Generating Station	Kapuskasing	268		Ontario Power Generation and Moose Cree First Nation	
Sonoco's Mill Dam	Glen Miller	8		Innergex Renewable Energy	
South Falls Generating Station	Bracebridge	5		Ontario Power Generation	
Steephill Falls Generating Station	Wawa	15		Brookfield Renewable Power	
Stewartville Station	45°24′26″N 76°30′24″W	182	September 21, 1948	Ontario Power Generation	
Stinson Generating Station	Sudbury	5		Ontario Power Generation	
Sturgeon Falls Generating Station	East of Atikokan	8		H2O Power LP	
Thomas Low Generating Station	Renfrew	4	September 2015	Renfrew Power Generation	
Toronto Power Generating Station	Niagara			Niagara Parks Commission	
Trethewey Falls Generating Station	Bracebridge	2		Ontario Power Generation	
Twin Falls Generating Station	Iroquois Falls	22		H2O Power LP	
Umbata Falls	Marathon	23		Innergex Renewable Energy	
Valerie Falls Generating Station	Atikokan	10		Brookfield Renewable Power	
Wabagishik Generating Station	46.3156°N 81.5212°W	3.74	1909	Vale Limited	
Wawaitin Generating Station	48°20′38″N 81°29′08″W	13		Ontario Power Generation	
Wawatay	Marathon	14	1992	Macquarie Power & Infrastructure	
Welland Canal Locks 1, 2 and 3	Welland Canal	6		Rankin Renewable Power	
Wells	Mississagi River	239		Brookfield Renewable Power	
Whitedog Falls Station	Kenora	68		Ontario Power Generation	
Wilson's Falls	45°03′44″N 79°18′38″W	2.9		Lakeland Holding	
Total		8130.81			

=== Wind ===
List of all wind farms in Ontario.

Name	Location	Capacity (MW)	Date	Owner	Ref
Adelaide Wind Farm	Middlesex County	60	2014	Suncor Energy	
Amaranth Wind Farm	44°06′00″N 80°16′15″W	199.5	2008	TransAlta	
Amherst Island Wind Farm	Amherst Island	75	2018	Windletric	
Armow Wind	Grey County	180	2015	Pattern Energy	
Belle River Wind Farm	Lakeshore	100	2017	Pattern Energy	
Bornish Wind Energy Centre	Middlesex County	72.9	2014	NextEra Energy Canada	
Bow Lake Wind Project	Sault Ste. Marie	58.32	2015	BluEarth Renewables	
Cedar Point Wind Power Project	Lambton County	99.96	2015	NextEra Energy Canada / Suncor Energy	
Chatham Wind Farm	42°14′N 82°24′W	101.2	2010	Kruger Energy	
Clear Creek Point Wind Farm	Norfolk County	9.9	2008	International Power	
Comber Wind Farm	Essex County	165.6	2012	Brookfield Renewable Power	
Conestogo Wind Energy Centre I	Conestogo	22.9	2012	NextEra Energy	
Cruickshank Wind Farm	Kincardine	8.25		Enbridge	
Cultus Wind Farm	Norfolk County	9.9		International Power	
Dillon Wind Centre	Raleigh	78	2011		
Dufferin Wind Farm	Melancthon	91.4	2013	Longyuan Canada Renewables Ltd.	
Exhibition Place Wind Turbine	43°37′49.5″N 79°25′29.3″W	0.6	2002	WindShare	
Ferndale Wind Farm	Ferndale	5.1		Sky Generation	
Frogmore Wind Farm	Norfolk County	9.9		International Power	
Gosfield	Kingsville	50	2011		
Grand Renewable Energy Park	Haldimand County	150	2015	Samsung Renewable Energy Inc, Korea Electric Power Corporation, Pattern Energy	
Greenwich Wind Farm	Greenwich	99	2012	Enbridge	
Harrow Wind Farm	Essex	39.6		International Power	
Henvey Inlet Wind Energy Centre (HIWEC)	Reserve No 2 of Henvey Inlet First Nation community	300	2019	Pattern Energy, Nigig Power	
Huron Wind	Tiverton	9	2002	Cameco, OMERS, TransCanada	
Kingsbridge	Goderich	39.6	2006	Capital Power Corporation	
McLean's Mountain Wind Farm		60	2013		
Mohawk Point Wind Farm	Norfolk County	9.9		International Power	
Niagara Region Wind Farm	Regional Municipality of Niagara	230	2016	Boralex	
North Kent	Chatham-Kent	100	2018	Pattern Energy	
OPG 7 commemorative turbine	Pickering	1.8	2001	Ontario Power Generation	
Pointe Aux Roche Wind		48.6	2012		
Port Alma	Chatham-Kent	101.2	2008	Kruger Energy	
Port Burwell Wind Farm	Port Burwell	99	2006	Macquarie Power & Infrastructure	
Port Dover and Nanticoke	Port Dover	105	2013	Capital Power Corporation	
Prince	Sault Ste. Marie	189	2006	Brookfield Renewable Power	
Proof Line Wind Farm	Lambton Shores	6.6		Sky Generation	
Providence Bay Wind Farm	Providence Bay	1.6		Schneider Power	
Ravenswood Wind Farm	Lambton Shores	9.9		Sky Generation	
Ripley	Huron-Kinloss	76	2007	Acciona, Suncor Energy	
Spence Wind Farm	Township of Howard and Oxford	98.9	2011		
Summerhaven Wind Energy Centre		125	2013		
Thames River I	Chatham-Kent	40		Boralex	
Underwood Wind Farm	44°20′20″N 81°27′32″W	181.5	2009	Enbridge	
Wolfe Island Wind Farm	44°10′N 76°28′W	197.8	2009	TransAlta	
Total		3417.43			

=== Solar ===
List of all solar farms in Ontario.

Name	Location	Capacity (MW)	Date	Owner	Ref
Belmont Solar 1 Farm	Belmont	20	2013	GE Power, Alterra	
Sarnia Photovoltaic Power Plant	Sarnia	97	2010	Enbridge	
Grand Renewable Energy Park	Haldimand County	100	2015	Samsung Renewable Energy Inc, Korea Electric Power Corporation, Pattern Energy	
Arnprior Solar Generating Station	Arnprior	23.4	2009	EDF Énergies Nouvelles	
Kingston Solar Project	Kingston	100	2015	Samsung Renewable Energy Inc.	
Nanticoke Solar Facility	Nanticoke	44	2019	Nanticoke Solar LP (Ontario Power Generation, Six Nations of the Grand River, Mississaugas of the Credit First Nation)	
Southgate Solar Project	Southgate	50	2016	Samsung Renewable Energy Inc.	
Loyalist Solar Facility	Stone Mills	54	2019	Loyalist Solar LP	
Belleville North Solar Project	Belleville	10	2013	Northland Power	
Belleville South Solar Project	Belleville	10	2013	Northland Power	
Burk's Falls East Solar Project	Armour	10	2013	Northland Power	
Burk's Falls West Solar Project	Ryerson	10	2014	Northland Power	
Crosby Solar Project	Rideau Lakes	10	2013	Northland Power	
Glendale Solar Project	South Glengarry	10	2014	Northland Power	
McCann Solar Project	Rideau Lakes	10	2013	Northland Power	
North Burgess Solar Project	Tay Valley	10	2014	Northland Power	
Rideau Lakes Solar Project	Rideau Lakes	10	2013	Northland Power	
Abitibi Solar Project	Cochrane	10	2015	Northland Power	
Empire Solar Project	Cochrane	10	2015	Northland Power	
Martin's Meadow Solar Project	Cochrane	10	2015	Northland Power	
Long Lake Solar Project	Cochrane	10	2015	Northland Power	
Windsor Solar Project	Windsor	50	2016	Samsung Renewable Energy Inc.	
Lily Lake Solar Farm	Peterborough	10	2011	Lily Lake Solar Inc.	
Total		648.4			

== Batteries ==
List of major grid batteries in Ontario.

Name	Location	Energy (MWh)	Power (MW)	Date	Owner	Ref
Hagersville	Haldimand	1200	300	2026	Boralex / Six Nations of the Grand River	
Oneida	Haldimand	1000	250	2025	Northland	
Sanjgon	Lakeshore	320	80	2026	Boralex / Walpole Island First Nation	

== Notes and references ==
Notes

== See also ==
- Ontario Power Generation
- Electricity policy of Ontario
- Energy in Canada
- List of electrical generating stations in Canada
