= List of killings by law enforcement officers in the United States, August 2026 =

This is a list of people reported killed by non-military law enforcement officers in the United States in August 2026, whether in the line of duty or not, and regardless of reason or method. The listing documents the occurrence of a death, making no implications regarding wrongdoing or justification on the part of the person killed or officer involved. Killings are arranged by date of the incident that caused death. Different death dates, if known, are noted in the description. The table below lists 113 people.

== August 2026 ==
Date	Name (age) of deceased	Race	Location	Description
2026-08-31	Alexes Thorpe (33)	White	Grovetown, Georgia	A GPD investigator in a vehicle was stopped by Thrope, who was hitting the window and yelling. The investigator ordered him to stepped back and also noticed he had a knife. Thrope later lunged toward the investigator before he was fatally shot.
2026-08-31	Carlos Hernandez (35)	Hispanic	San Fernando, California	A man who was attacking a woman with a shovel was shot and killed by officers as they encountered him.
2026-08-31	Rodolfo Hernandez	Hispanic	Mesa, Arizona	Police responded to a call about a man making threats while having a gun on his waistband. When officers arrived and attempted to get him to speak with them, an unrelated motorcyclist crashed into a police vehicle that was on scene. Subsequently, officers spotted the man holding a gun behind a brick wall before an officer opened fire and killed him.
2026-08-31	unidentified male	Unknown	Cornwall, New York	An off-duty Westchester County corrections officer struck a pedestrian during a motor vehicle collision. The man died on September 5 following the incident.
2026-08-31	Pamela Cisneros (49)	Hispanic	New York City, New York	A woman stabbed two people at Times Square, killing one, before being shot and killed by police when she charged at them. The footage was released.
2026-08-30	Brianna Skiesha Zara Edwards (25)	Black	Spartanburg, South Carolina	Police responded to a call about a woman screaming at an apartment complex, where Edwards pointed a gun at them. Officers shot her in response. Edwards’ family said she struggled with mental health and she had reached out for help.
2026-08-30	Richard Bernard Hovis (44)	Black	Greensboro, North Carolina	After shooting a woman, Hovis was spotted fleeing the scene by police. Officers gave chase, but Hovis turned around in an attempt to ambush them, prompting the pursuing officer to shoot him.
2026-08-30	Crysti Vincent	White	Nephi, Utah	Police responded to a domestic violence incident where both Vincent and her ex-husband called police, with Vincent saying she was going to shoot her ex-husband. Officers attempted to arrest Vincent at her home. According to charging documents, Vincent told her friend to give her her gun, which he did, before she fired at police. Police fired back, killing her. The friend was charged with felony murder and assault on an officer.
2026-08-29	Jason William Sexton (54)	White	Nashville, Tennessee	A Shell gas station clerk called police after Sexton threatened him with a sword. Police found Sexton and a woman in a vehicle, and the woman indicated she was being held hostage by Sexton. Following a stand-off, an officer fatally shot Sexton dead as he stood outside his gray BMW 4 Series while holding the sword. SWAT officer Joshua Baney, who shot Sexton, was decommissioned by Nashville’s police chief after the shooting. The footage was released.
2026-08-29	Edward Young Jr. (34)	Black	Labelle, Florida	Hendry County deputies responded to a report of reckless driving before they pulled a suspected vehicle over. A shootout occurred which left the driver, Young, dead.
2026-08-29	Timothy Visa Xayyaraj (37)	Asian	Georgetown, Texas	Police responded to reports of a man acting erratically and jumping on cars in Georgetown Square. During the encounter, Xayyaraj reached for his waistband but officers had determined that he didn't have a weapon. He then fought with the officers, allegedly reaching for one's gun. An officer shot him. Police also said there was a similar encounter with Xayyaraj involving Williamson County Sheriff’s Office in the morning, but he was released following insufficient information to establish probable cause.
2026-08-29	Adam Tyler Dowdy (33)	White	Columbia, South Carolina	Police spotted Dowdy, a suspect in a domestic violence report, at a park. When they confronted him, Dowdy fired at officers, killing Officer Christopher DeLong and injuring another officer. Dowdy was also killed in the shoot-out.
2026-08-29	Kenneth Williams Sr. (67)	Black	Gary, Indiana	A security guard was killed in an officer-involved shooting involving Lake County Sheriff's Department and Gary Police Department at a Gary transit station. It's unknown what led up to the shooting.
2026-08-28	Eric Thurman (43)	Unknown	Beechgrove, Coffee County, Tennessee	Coffee County deputies identified Thurman as having an active warrant for a probation violation while they were sent to crack down criminal activities in the area. Thurman then slashed a deputy with a machete before another deputy shot Thurman dead.
2026-08-28	Ryan Barnett (44)	White	Cumberland Furnace, Tennessee	Dickson County deputies pursued a trailer thief who fired at them during the encounter. After a vehicular pursuit that ended in a crash near an intersection, the subject exited the vehicle with a gun when deputies fired shots.
2026-08-28	William Warfel (23)	White	Cabool, Missouri	West Plains officers conducted an attempted traffic stop on a vehicle for suspicion of narcotics transaction. The driver fled, prompting a vehicular pursuit on U.S. 60. Howell County Sheriff's Office later took over the pursuit, which ended when deputies performed a PIT maneuver. Warfel, the driver, then fired at them and was struck in the shootout. He died a day later.
2026-08-27	Enrique Lozano (35)	Hispanic	Lathrop, California	An unarmed man was shot by officers during a domestic violence incident when he grabbed an officer's service weapon. The footage had been released.
2026-08-27	Romero Anthony Hernandez (22)	Hispanic	Chandler, Arizona	A suspect who was waving a gun at an intersection was shot by police when he ignored commands to drop it.
2026-08-27	Jacob Hastings (37)	White	Portland, Maine	Hastings was reported for threatening employees of a seafood restaurant with a gun and stealing one of the restaurant's trucks. Officers pursued Hastings and shot him after he allegedly reached for his waistband. Hastings was a member of the Aryan Nations.
2026-08-27	Marcellus Tremaine Robinson (39)	Black	Asheville, North Carolina	Police responded to reports of breaking and entering at a home. When officers went inside, they encountered a man who was armed with a knife. They fatally shot him as he refused to drop it.
2026-08-26	Keith Charles Cowgill (50)	Unknown	Alamogordo, New Mexico	Police responded to a report of an armed and suicidal male in a home. Despite crisis negotiation team's and de-escalation efforts, the man exited the house carrying a rifle. Four officers shot him.
2026-08-26	Brendan Norris (27)	White	Newport, Rhode Island	A harbormaster spotted a stolen vessel out of Jersey City, New Jersey and reported it to police. When officers came, Norris, who was on the bow, fled and fired at officers. Officers fired back, killing him. An officer was shot in the leg. The footage had been released by police.
2026-08-25	Erik Simon Sanders (24)	White	San Diego, California	Residents told the police that a man who was armed with a knife at his backyard demanded them to call 911. The man subsequently entered another home which had guns inside. When officers arrived, the man barricaded inside the home and gunshots can be heard. At some point, he exited the home with a gun before an officer shot him. The footage was released by police.
2026-08-25	Anthony Chavez (39)	Hispanic	San Jose, California	Police officers were searching for a robbery suspect in a manhunt after he crashed a stolen vehicle and broke into a home. The department's MERGE unit entered the home without knowing the suspect was hiding inside a bathroom. A police sergeant was shot multiple times before officers killed the suspect in the shootout. Police said Chavez had committed a string of robberies. The footage was released.
2026-08-25	Robert Rudolph Richards Jr. (51)	White	Woodland Park, Colorado	During a traffic stop, Richards shot and injured a state trooper before fleeing. He also shot another trooper when that trooper spotted him on the country road. When he tried to ambush Teller County deputies, deputies shot him dead.
2026-08-24	Ryan Nolan Cerentano (40)	White	Granite City, Illinois	A man who was armed with multiple guns was shot by a Madison County deputy and a city officer after refused to drop the guns in possession. He died few days later. The footage had been released.
2026-08-24	Jason Levi Stroud (43)	Unknown	Burleson, Texas	Cleburne police responded to a report of someone brandishing a firearm. When they spotted the suspect, a vehicular pursuit ensued. A witness said officers rammed a blue truck before the suspect ran into a Sam's Club. A shootout then left an officer injured and the suspect dead.
2026-08-24	Otis Lee Phillips Jr. (50)	Black	Birmingham, Alabama	A man was seen waving a gun around and shooting toward a home in Ensley neighbirhood. Officers encountered the suspect who approached them with a gun. Police then fatally shot him.
2026-08-24	James Mayer (20)	White	Lubbock, Texas	Officers attempted to contact Mayer, who was inside a vehicle, for a felony warrant. Mayer refused to comply, fired a shot from the vehicle, before driving off. At some point after the chase, he exited the car with a gun when he was fatally shot.
2026-08-24	unidentified male	Unknown	Tustin, California	Police responded to a domestic incident where they found a woman deceased with stab wounds inside a residence. The suspect advanced toward officers with a knife before being shot.
2026-08-24	Jonhatan Anguiano (29)	Hispanic	Lodi, California	Anguiano, who was a McDonald's employee at the time, shot at his coworkers in the restaurant, injuring one. Police arrived and shot and killed him. The footage was released by police.
2026-08-23	Jadiel Molina (9)	Hispanic	Houston, Texas	A Harris County deputy who was heading north struck with a DUI driver who was heading south but crossed over his lane. Molina, a nine-year-old child passenger inside the DUI driver's pickup truck, was ejected and killed.
2026-08-23	Frederick Marty (62)	White	Elbridge, New York	Onondaga County SWAT team responded to shots fired reports. Upon arrival, Marty, the suspect, pointed his rifle at the drone and the deputies from a residence. One SWAT member shot him. The drone footage was released.
2026-08-23	Anthony Porter (22)	Unknown	Mogul, Nevada	Reno Police and state police responded to reports of an overturned vehicle. During which, they encountered a man holding a gun telling police to shoot him. After 16 minutes, he raised the gun at officers when officers fired shots. The footage was released.
2026-08-23	Leonel Lozoya-Esparza (19)	Hispanic	Kansas City, Kansas	Police responded to a reported noise complaint. Officers shot and killed Lozoya-Esparza after he allegedly turned towards them while holding a gun.
2026-08-23	Glen Pysher (22)	White	Upper Pottsgrove Township, Pennsylvania	Police shot and killed Pysher while responding to a break-in call. Pysher's mother said he mistook the home for his friend's and was knocking on the back door, leading to the call. The officer who shot Pysher was later charged with manslaughter. According to an affidavit, the officer said that Pysher had charged towards him, but video showed him approaching the officer with his hands raised.
2026-08-22	Mark Alan Olson (46)	White	Ontario, Oregon	Police officers responded to a report of a man threatening to use a gun against others. The situation escalated before officers used less-lethal means such as a pepper ball and taser to subdue him. The subject later became showing medical distress before dying.
2026-08-22	Johnny Herrera (57)	White	Clifton, Colorado	Mesa County Police responded to a report and tried to arrest Herrera for vandalism. Herrera physically resisted before being detained. He later lost consciousness and died. Mesa County Coroner determined Herrera died “from mixed methamphetamine and bupropion intoxication, with obesity and law enforcement restraint contributing to his death” a few months later. No officers involved will face criminal charges.
2026-08-22	Brian Michael Pepal (48)	White	St. Petersburg, Florida	Officers went to conduct a welfare check on a man in mental health crisis after a woman flagged them down. A scuffle ensued between the man and the officers. Police used force and tasers to take him into custody when the man lost consciousness and died. His death was ruled a homicide. The footage was released.
2026-08-22	Michael Rodriguez (44)	Hispanic	Santa Monica, California	Police were interviewing witnesses in a domestic violence case in Palisades Park when they encountered another man unrelated to the case. Officers shot the man when he approached them with a knife, and was pronounced dead an hour later. Police released the footage.
2026-08-22	unidentified male (29)	Unknown	Dover Township, Otsego County, Michigan	Police pursued a man who fled a traffic stop. The pursuit ended when the driver hit a Michigan State Police car and crashed into a tree. An officer shot the man afterwards; the specific circumstances were not revealed. Police said the man was armed.
2026-08-21	Linda Ann McAbee (55)	Unknown	Townville, South Carolina	An Anderson County deputy responded to reports of gunshots and confronted McAbee. She shot at the deputy before being fatally struck by returned fire.
2026-08-21	Tawfiq Abdul Haqq (33)	Black	Suitland, Maryland	Prince George’s County Police followed two vehicles onto a dead-end street. Police shot one of the drivers after he drove on a yard and towards an officer. The footage was released.
2026-08-21	Hector Perez (37)	Hispanic	Newington, Connecticut	Hartford Police were investigating a possible illegal activity when a suspect fled while armed. After the search, officers located and stopped his vehicle. A shootout would then occur which left two officers injured and the suspect dead. The footage was released by the Inspector General.
2026-08-21	William Woodworth (64)	White	Cambridge, Massachusetts	Police responded to a report of a suspicious individual. When they were on scene investigating, a man got out of his vehicle and pointed a gun at them. Officers shot him. The footage were released and the officers' actions were ruled justified by the Middlesex District Attorney.
2026-08-21	unidentified female	Unknown	Tallahassee, Florida	A pedestrian who crossed a red light was struck and killed by a Leon County police cruiser at an intersection.
2026-08-21	Hunter Rae Posey (27)	White	Green Bay, Wisconsin	Amid a welfare check, Posey brandished a weapon and officers shot her. The footage had been released; however, the confrontation had been blurred out. All the officers had been cleared by Brown County District Attorney David Lasee.
2026-08-20	Erik Leopold Sharpe (32)	White	Leesburg, Florida	Sharpe's mother reported that Sharpe was intoxicated and was assaulting his parents. Lake County deputies arrived and ordered Sharpe to get on the ground. He reached for the gun instead. Deputies shot him subsequently. The footage was released.
2026-08-20	David Setayesh (40)	White	Duncan, Oklahoma	Ofc. Jarrod Bishop was involved in a deadly hit-and-run that killed Setayesh when Bishop was off-duty. Bishop is in police custody.
2026-08-19	Paul Sokoloski (57)	Unknown	Carlisle, Pennsylvania	A Cessna 150 struck a Pennsylvania State Police Bell 407 Helicopter midair after it veered off course while on approach. The pilot was killed in the collision, and two troopers were injured.
2026-08-18	unidentified male (39)	Unknown	Central Point, Oregon	Jackson County Sheriff's Office responded to a 911 call from the victim who was confused and speaking incoherently and claimed someone drugged him. When they arrived, the subject was in the roadway and seemed to be intoxicated. During the DUII arrest, The subject began resisting before a deputy "lowered him to the ground" and called for additional units. The subject became unresponsive and died afterwards. The sheriff's office will not release the name of the subject for the respect to his kin.
2026-08-18	Hayden Hart (20)	White	Moorefield, West Virginia	Hart, who was wanted for charges related to kidnapping, was stopped by a Hardy County deputy before he opened fire at the deputy. The deputy returned fire, wounding him. He would then flee into the Monongahela National Forest and elude the police. After a manhunt, Hart was located in a home he had broken into. He was killed in a shootout involving a Hardy County deputy, a Hampshire County Deputy, and a Natural Resources Police officer.
2026-08-18	Zachary Newbern (34)	White	Iliff, Colorado	Four Logan County sheriff's deputies shot Newbern, a motorcyclist, during a speeding and driving complaint that ended in a fatal confrontation. A firearm was located.
2026-08-18	Christopher Ford (45)	White	Jacksonville, Florida	Ford approached a JSO police sergeant, who was doing paperwork in his vehicle. The two had a short conversation before Ford produced a gun, walked backward, and fired at the officer but missed. The officer fired back, killing him. The footage was released.
2026-08-18	Lora Brady (53)	Unknown	Anchorage, Alaska	Police responded to a apartment building due to reports about an intoxicated suicidal woman who was pointing a gun at staff members. Despite de-escalation efforts, the woman was ultimately seen pointing a gun from the window at officers. An officer fired a shot, killing her.
2026-08-17	Gregory Boaz (56)	White	San Antonio, Texas	Boaz called police to report people in his backyard, though police did not find anyone there. Boaz's girlfriend told officers that he was armed with knives. The officer found Boaz and shot him after he began advancing towards the officer while carrying a knife. Police released the footage.
2026-08-17	Ricardo Peña Parga Castillo (31)	Hispanic	Heyburn, Idaho	A state trooper shot and killed a man during a traffic stop. Few details were immediately released.
2026-08-16	Wei Chan (54)	Asian	New York City, New York	Police responded to an assault call in the Lower East Side and encountered Chan with a butcher knife. Police said officers told Chan to drop the knife and shot him when he failed to comply. Chan's father was treated for a gash on the head. The footage was released.
2026-08-16	Jose Osornio (39)	Hispanic	Mission, Texas	Police responded to a call regarding a person experiencing a high-stress situation. They shot the subject when he moved toward them with a knife.
2026-08-16	Francisco Javier Montes-Hernandez (33)	Hispanic	Monroe, North Carolina	A woman called police to report a man breaking into her home. The first officer found a man matching the suspect's description and shot him after he allegedly pointed a gun at them.
2026-08-16	unidentified male (23)	Unknown	Taylorsville, Utah	During a burglary and assault investigation, officers shot a suspect who stabbed a victim multiple times and was armed with a knife. The victim survived but was in critical condition.
2026-08-15	Khylin Stevens (28)	Black	Lake Charles, Louisiana	Police responded to a 911 call reporting that Stevens was not acting right and was carrying a knife. After negotiation and de-escalation attempts, Stevens produced a weapon before he was shot and killed by an officer.
2026-08-15	Francisco Aparicio-Muñoz (57)	Hispanic	Bel Air, Maryland	During a traffic stop, a fight between the officer and Aparicio-Muñoz ensued. The officer was injured. Video showed Aparicio-Muñoz running away before the officer shot him.
2026-08-15	Robert McNally (46)	White	Brownsboro, Texas	A Texas DPS trooper saw a reported suicidal man armed with a gun and ordered him to drop it when responding to a call. The man then proceeded to raise it at the trooper before being shot.
2026-08-15	Timothy Cromwell (23)	Black	Green Township, Hamilton County, Ohio	Cromwell abducted a victim who was working at Mercy Health West Hospital. Cincinnati officers located the vehicle and chased it down to an intersection, where SWAT team blocked its way. When officers confronted him, Cromwell charged at them with a knife and was shot.
2026-08-14	Paul Ronald Selby (78)	Unknown	Mentone, California	A man shot at a cleaning crew before barricading himself in his home. SBSD deputies arrived and fatally shot him in a shootout.
2026-08-14	Benjamin Randall Collins (26)	White	Austin, Texas	A suspect stole a Fort Worth ambulance and led DPS troopers on a chase on Interstate 35 in Austin. At some point, the suspect began to intentionally ram civilian vehicles. A trooper shot him dead as PIT maneuver attempts were to no avail.
2026-08-14	Matthew Scott Beaulieu Sr. (39)	Native American	Red Lake, Minnesota	Police responded to a shots fired report in the tribal residential area and an officer fatally shot an individual. FBI is leading the investigation.
2026-08-14	Lorenzo Gray (30)	Black	Kannapolis, North Carolina	Officers responded to a 911 call involving a man firing a gun near an intersection in downtown Kannapolis. Upon arrival, the man attempted to carjack an unidentified vehicle before he was shot by officers. He was transported to a nearby hospital where he was pronounced dead.
2026-08-13	Geronimo Urbina (46)	Unknown	Seguin, Texas	Guadalupe County deputies shot and killed Urbina, who was holding a knife against a woman's neck.
2026-08-13	Marcus Devon Gordon (39)	Black	Birmingham, Alabama	Gordon, a bicyclist, was initially struck by a Jefferson County Sheriff’s Office patrol cruiser before being struck by a tractor-trailer. Gordon was thrown out and killed. The name of the deputy involved wasn't released.
2026-08-13	Matthew Sean Massey (38)	Unknown	Birmingham, Alabama	A man reportedly assaulted an employee at a McDonald's before being pursued by an officer on foot. The chase ended in the north parking deck of UAB St. Vincent’s, where a struggle between the suspect and the officer ensued. The suspect tried to gain control of the officer's taser before the officer opened fire.
2026-08-11	Sean O'Mara (39)	White	Albuquerque, New Mexico	Officers responded to the Odyssey Apartments of a caller inside Building #15 who was making false claims. At some point, the man began to fire at them with over 120 rounds, while wearing a ballistic vest. Two officers shot back, killing him. The footage was released.
2026-08-11	Asia Bennett (22)	Hispanic	Jacksonville, Florida	JSO officers responded to a domestic dispute between a couple, with a woman, Bennett, armed with a knife. Bennett moved toward the officers while shouting "kill me" before being shot by a female officer approximately 10 feet away. The footage was released by the department.
2026-08-11	Marcus Maurice Williams (31)	Unknown	Cartersville, Georgia	Bartow County deputies responded to a report about the suspect, Williams, was pointing a gun at employees at a McDonald's on Joe Frank Harris Parkway. Deputies shot the man in the parking lot as he fired at them.
2026-08-10	Mandy Fackler	White	Shady Hills, Florida	A Pinellas County Sheriff's deputy kidnapped Fackler, his ex-girlfriend, from her Hudson home. After Fackler's children called police, officers found the deputy and Fackler dead in a rental vehicle. Police said the deputy killed Fackler and himself.
2026-08-10	Holden Smith (37)	Unknown	Findlay, Ohio	A caller told the police that he was waving a handgun and threatening to harm himself. Officers arrived and shot the man, Smith, as he raised the gun at them. The footage was released.
2026-08-10	Dariss Yearby (20)	Black	Longmont, Colorado	Police officers shot a suspect who took a person hostage with a gun during a disturbance report response.
2026-08-09	Gregory Kase (62)	White	Henrietta, New York	A reported suicidal male who was armed with a boxcutter at a Super 8 motel near Interstate 390 was shot by two Monroe County deputies when he approached them in a room. Kase's family said deputies were not told he was deaf. The sheriff's office released the footage in a press conference.
2026-08-09	Russell L. Kelly Jr. (47)	Unknown	Byhalia, Mississippi	Byhalia Police were called to a home on the night of August 8, for a woman who was shot and killed by Kelly. When they arrived and evacuated the occupants inside, Kelly refused to surrender and fired at them, leading to a standoff. About ten hours later, an officer shot Kelly as Kelly fired at them.
2026-08-09	Adolphus Christopher Morris (44)	White	Sardis, Georgia	Morris killed four people across two residences in the north side of the city. When Burke County deputies found him inside a vehicle with his grandmother, a chase ensued before Morris crashed his vehicle due to spike strips. He was then killed in a shootout with deputies.
2026-08-08	unidentified male	Unknown	New York City, New York	A man who was knocked out during a fight was struck by two vehicles, including a police cruiser. The initial vehicle who struck the man fled.
2026-08-08	Antonio Austin Haner (29)	White	Crestview, Florida	Okaloosa County deputies were serving an arrest warrant related to residential shootings on Haner when Haner opened fire with a rifle on them. Police stated they adopted "SWAT tactics." They used an armored truck to strike and pin Haner against the house, killing him. No officers fired at Haner.
2026-08-08	Hailie D. Hune (21)	White	Huntsville, Alabama	Hune fled a traffic stop before later running off the road and crashing into a barrier. A pursuing state trooper then crashed into her vehicle, killing her.
2026-08-08	James Wilson (22)	Unknown	Houston, Texas	Police responded to a report of a person down inside a parking garage in Briarmeadow. When officers arrived, a gunman was standing over an unresponsive man who was shot. Officers ordered the suspect to drop the weapon before they opened fire and killed him. The victim also succumbed to the wounds. The following footage was released by HPD.
2026-08-08	Kenneth Eugene Jordan (48)	White	New Boston, Texas	Jordan initially stabbed a woman before a homeowner held him at gunpoint until law enforcement arrived. Despite less-lethal efforts utilized by police, Jordan moved toward the New Boston Police Department K-9 and the handler while he was armed with a knife. A Hooks police officer fatally shot him. The victim was in severe condition but expected to survive.
2026-08-08	Javier Ordonez (60)	Hispanic	Downey, California	Officers responded to a home for reports of shots fired. Upon arrival, they found two individuals who were shot to death and an armed suspect. The suspect came toward the officers when the officers shot him.
2026-08-08	unidentified male	Unknown	Golden, Colorado	Police officers responded to a report of a man armed with a handgun before being fired upon at a Circle K. The shootout left an officer injured and the suspect dead.
2026-08-06	Shaun Murphy (47)	Unknown	Millville, New Jersey	A domestic disturbance call escalated into a standoff for reasons unknown. A Cumberland County Prosecutor's Office sergeant shot Murphy.
2026-08-06	Ja'Sean Fritz (20)	Black	Hopkins, South Carolina	Fritz, one of the three suspects who was wanted for murdering a man in Orangeburg on July 30, was killed in a confrontation with Richland County deputies after he shot at them. Other two suspects surrendered to Orangeburg Police three days later.
2026-08-06	Enoch Harville (61)	White	Land O' Lakes, Florida	Harville, the subject of a domestic violence investigation, was shot dead when he approached Pasco County deputies with a shotgun and pointed it at them.
2026-08-06	Angel Bowers (27)	White	Kathleen, Florida	Bowers was wanted after he didn't show up at a court case for “unlawful sex with a minor.” Polk County deputies responded to a report from the bondsman and later tracked down Bowers, who was in a tent in the woods. When they came near, Bowers fired at them, hitting police K-9 Ace before being shot to death by deputies. K-9 Ace's one front leg was amputated by vets in order to survive.
2026-08-06	James Salinas (32)	Hispanic	Nashville, Tennessee	ATF agents were conducting an operation involving the suspected sale of unlawful firearms. During the encounter, a shootout occurred. They shot two suspects dead.
2026-08-06	Denzel Molina (16)	Hispanic	Nashville, Tennessee	ATF agents were conducting an operation involving the suspected sale of unlawful firearms. During the encounter, a shootout occurred. They shot two suspects dead.
2026-08-06	Ugochukwu Ilodigwe (23)	Black	Aldan, Pennsylvania	A Delaware County female officer shot and killed a suspect who pulled a knife on her when the officer responded to a call. The footage was released and the officer's actions were justified.
2026-08-05	unidentified male (18)	Unknown	West Palm Beach, Florida	Palm Beach County deputies responded to a disturbance involving a father and a son, who was armed with a knife. Upon arrival, the son was holding a kitchen knife against his parents. At some point, a struggle ensued. Though deputies deployed tasers on the son, the son got on top of his father and appeared ready to stab him. Deputies instantly fired shots, killing him. The father was taken to a hospital for a stab wound.
2026-08-05	Eduardo Sanchez Figueroa (49)	Hispanic	Littlerock, California	A SBSD detective exchanged fire with a suspect inside a SUV. The detective was shot and the suspect died while his body was hanging out of the driver’s seat. Details are limited.
2026-08-05	Patrick Allen (46)	Black	Knoxville, Tennessee	Officers arrived at a BreadBox convenience store for a trespasser who refused to leave. When officers tried to take him into custody, a struggle ensued when he resisted. After being taken into custody, the suspect walked himself to the cruiser with no issue. However, his condition suddenly began to deteriorate while being evaluated and died at a hospital. Knoxville Police released the footage. The Knox County District Attorney’s Office will not prosecute officers involved.
2026-08-04	Angel Tywan Lucas Lindsey (21)	Black	Las Vegas, Nevada	Police responded to reports of a man waving a gun before the suspect ambushed the officers. LMVPD Officer Austin Abdelnabi, 30, was shot and killed as he stepped out the cruiser. Another responding officer shot the suspect to death. The footage from the officer who returned fire was released. Ofc. Abdelnabi's bodycam was struck by gunfire during the incident so it is no longer accessible.
2026-08-04	Derek Robert Martin (45)	White	Coeur d'Alene, Idaho	Kootenai County Police responded to reports of an armed, suspicious man who contacted children in the area. Deputies found the man and the man fled on foot. The man would then fired at deputies, hitting a K9. SWAT team shot him dead on scene.
2026-08-04	unidentified male	Unknown	Baytown, Texas	Officers pulled a vehicle over for a suspect wanted in Chambers County. During the encounter, the passenger and the suspect didn't comply before officers deployed pepper balls and police K9. The suspect crawled into the vehicle's trunk before being found under medical distress. He died in a hospital.
2026-08-04	Reece Ababao (20)	Asian	Round Rock, Texas	Officers responded to a domestic violence report and one of them shot a suspect who was armed with a knife during the encounter. A male and a female were found with stab wounds inside the home and are in critical condition.
2026-08-03	John E. Granger III (50)	Black	Independence, Louisiana	A Livingston Parish attempted to stop a car related to a criminal investigation. Granger refused to stop and fled, prompting a pursuit which ended in a crash. Granger then fled into a wooded area on foot and proceeded to gain control of a deputy's taser in a struggle. The deputy shot him in response.
2026-08-03	Perry Forster (59)	White	Mesa, Arizona	A domestic violence incident escalated into a police shooting as the suspect lunged at responding officers with an ax. The suspect also damaged nearby vehicles.
2026-08-03	Larry Renaldo Riles (46)	Black	Lakeland, Florida	Polk County deputies used a license plate reader to identify an outstanding probation violation suspect in a dark blue 2012 Chevrolet Captiva Sport with an Uber sign in his windshield. Riles parked in front of a Subway near the George Jenkins intersection in West Lakeland before three patrol cars closed in the suspect. Deputies shot him as he rammed the blocking patrol vehicles and racked a stolen semi-automatic 9mm handgun inside his car.
2026-08-03	Jacob Rader (34)	White	New Lebanon, Ohio	Rader, who was suspected of stealing a vehicle, was shot and killed by police officers at his residence when he raised a gun at them.
2026-08-03	Stacey Lerke (49)	White	Amarillo, Texas	DPS troopers assisted local police on a chase until the subject crashed the vehicle. The subject, Lerke, armed himself with an airsoft rifle and ignored commands before being shot.
2026-08-01	unidentified male	Unknown	Fairfield, Texas	A Freestone County deputy attempted a stop on a vehicle, but it fled, prompting a pursuit exceeding 125mph. At some point, the suspect pulled over. A physical altercation subsequently ensued between the suspect and the deputy. During which, the deputy shot the suspect.
2026-08-01	Raul Garza (69)	Hispanic	San Antonio, Texas	A caller told the police that a man was waving a handgun across his home. A witness said that as officers tried to tase the suspect, he pulled a gun on them before five opened fire. Police released the footage.
2026-08-01	Paul Andrew Terry (68)	Unknown	Raton, New Mexico	Police responded to a domestic violence call before encountering the subject, Terry, who fired at them and retreated inside the residence. Terry was fatally struck by returned fire.
2026-08-01	Brett Eschliman (28)	White	Gilbert, Arizona	Eschliman stabbed and killed two people and injured another person he knew in a residence. As responding officers heard a woman screaming and pursued the suspect inside the residence into a bedroom. Eschliman lunged toward him with a long metal object directed at the officer’s head and neck before being shot twice. The footage had been released.
2026-08-01	Cemal Sadiku (68)	Unknown	Anchorage, Alaska	A police officer who was responding to a shots fired call with emergency lights activated collided with a taxi at an intersection. The taxi driver and front-seat passenger were killed. The other three passengers and the officer were hospitalized. Ofc. Kaden Pohl, who was involved in the incident, was also the officer who shot and killed a suspect back in June 2026.
2026-08-01	William Phillips (45)	Unknown	Anchorage, Alaska	A police officer who was responding to a shots fired call with emergency lights activated collided with a taxi at an intersection. The taxi driver and front-seat passenger were killed. The other three passengers and the officer were hospitalized. Ofc. Kaden Pohl, who was involved in the incident, was also the officer who shot and killed a suspect back in June 2026.

== See also ==
- Death in custody § United States
- Henry A. Wallace Police Crime Public Database
- List of cases of police brutality
- List of countries with annual rates and counts for killings by law enforcement officers
- List of law enforcement officers killed in the line of duty in the United States
- List of law enforcement officers convicted for an on-duty killing in the United States
- List of shootings by US immigration agents
- List of police reforms related to the George Floyd protests
- List of unarmed African Americans killed by law enforcement officers in the United States
- Lists of killings by law enforcement officers
- Police brutality in the United States
- Police misconduct § United States
- Police riot § United States
- Police use of deadly force in the United States
