= Mississauga Cogeneration Plant =

Natural gas power station in Toronto

- Country: Canada
- Location: Mississauga, Ontario
- Coordinates: 43°41′53″N 79°38′33″W
- Status: Operational
- Commission date: 1992
- Decommission date: 2018
- Owner: TransAlta (50%)

Thermal power station
- Primary fuel: Natural gas
- Cogeneration?: Yes

Power generation
- Units operational: 2 × LM6000 PC gas turbines 1 × steam turbine
- Nameplate capacity: 122 MW

Mississauga Cogeneration Plant was a natural gas power station partially owned by TransAlta and located adjacent to Toronto Pearson International Airport. The plant was primarily used to supply steam and power to nearby industrial clients with surplus power sold onto the Ontario grid. From 1992 to 2007, it supplied thermal energy to the McDonnell Douglas and later Boeing aircraft parts plant. As of 2018 the plant is no longer actively generating electricity. The plant started demolition in April 2020.

The plant was located across near Airport Road and Derry Road next to the former Boeing aircraft plant (now demolished).

== See also ==
- GTAA Cogeneration Plant
