= Genesee Generating Station =

Natural gas-fired power station in Leduc County, Alberta

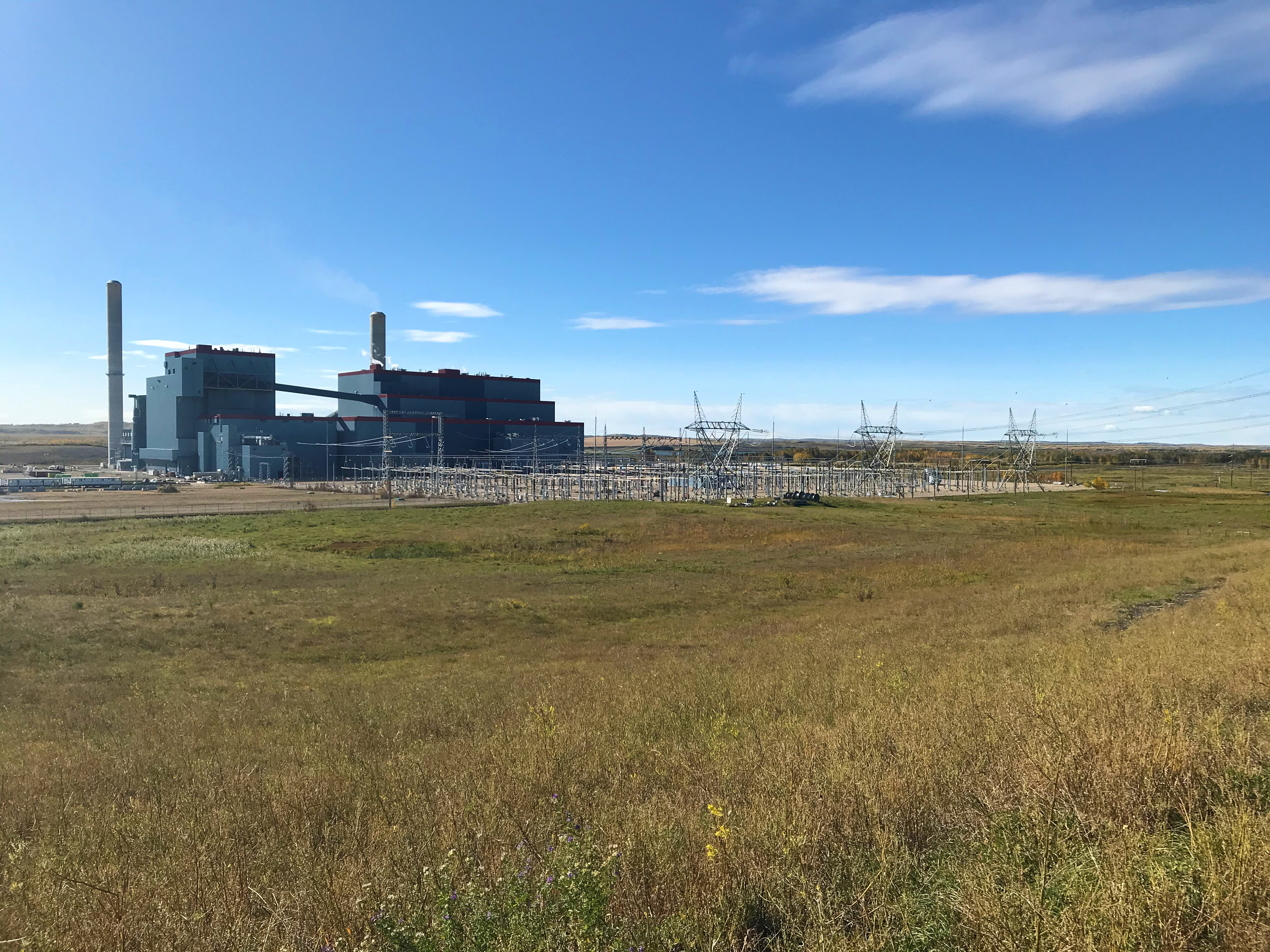
- Genesee Generating Station in 2020
- Country: Canada
- Location: Genesee, Alberta
- Coordinates: 53.343°N 114.303°W
- Status: Operational
- Commission date: 1989 (G2), 1994 (G1), 2005 (G3)
- Owner: Capital Power

Thermal power station
- Primary fuel: Natural gas (100%)
- Turbine technology: Steam turbine
- Cooling source: Genesee cooling pond

Power generation
- Units operational: 2 × 666 MW subcritical natural gas-fired steam 1 × 525 MW supercritical natural gas-fired steam
- Units planned: 2 × 530 MW combined cycle gas turbines (both 50% Capital Power Corporation, 50% ENMAX Corporation)
- Nameplate capacity: 1,857 MW

External links
- Website: capitalpower.com/operations/genesee-generating-station/

Genesee Generating Station is a thermal power station owned by Capital Power Corporation, located near Genesee, Alberta, Canada; 71 km (44 miles) southwest of Edmonton, Alberta. The cooling pond covers 735 hectares (1,820 acres). The pond is topped up with water from the North Saskatchewan River. As of June 18, 2024, all units are 100% natural gas-fueled.

The station consists of three units.

== Description ==
The Genesee Generating Station consists of:

- G1 - one 666 Gross MW unit (commissioned in May 1994)
- G2 - one 666 Gross MW unit (commissioned in October 1989)
- G3 - one 525 Gross MW unit (commissioned in March 2005)

The boilers were supplied by Combustion Engineering/Hitachi while the turbines/generator are supplied by GEC/Hitachi. The plant has two smokestacks, one 138 m (453 ft) tall, the other 121 m (397 ft) tall.

=== Conversion to natural gas ===
On 18 June 2019, Capital Power announced plans to expand the "dual-fuel" capabilities of all three units to running off 50% coal and 50% natural gas, with the intent to convert the power station to 100% natural gas use by 2030. Capital Power submitted applications in 2020 and received approval from the AUC and AEP in 2021 to convert Units 1 and 2 to Natural Gas Combined Cycle (NGCC) technology. The project also includes addition of a 210 MW Battery Energy Storage System (BESS). Unit 3 was converted to a 60/40 ratio of coal to natural gas in spring 2021 and will be converted to enable 100% gas firing in 2023. According to Capital Power, all units were to be off coal by 2023. The date for units 1 and 2 has since been delayed to 2024. Capital Power announced on May 1, 2024 that Genesee 1 had been retired and was undergoing a refit to natural gas generation. On June 18, 2024, Capital Power announced that all units are now 100% natural gas-fueled, five years ahead of the Alberta government mandate for the phaseout of coal power.

== See also ==
- List of largest power stations in Canada
- List of natural gas-fired power stations in Canada
- List of tallest smokestacks in Canada
