= Island Generating Station =

- Country: Canada
- Location: Campbell River, British Columbia
- Coordinates: 50°04′08″N 125°16′55″W
- Status: Operational
- Commission date: April 2002
- Owner: Capital Power Corporation

Thermal power station
- Primary fuel: Natural gas
- Turbine technology: Gas turbine

Power generation
- Nameplate capacity: 254 MW

Island Generating Station (also known as Island Cogeneration Ltd.) is a natural gas-fired station owned by Capital Power Corporation, in Campbell River, British Columbia, Canada. The plant operates as a co-generation facility under a 20-year power purchase agreement with BC Hydro while steam is supplied to Elk Falls Mill.

== Description ==
The Power Station consists of one 254 MW gas turbine (supplied by ABB).

== See also ==
- List of natural gas-fired power stations in Canada
- List of generating stations in British Columbia
