= Kingsbridge Wind Power Project =

Wind farm between Goderich and Kincardine, Ontario, Canada

Coordinates: 43°46′N 81°39′W

Kingsbridge Wind Power Project, also referred to as Kingsbridge 1 Wind facility , refers to a large wind farm owned and operated by Capital Power Corporation. Kingsbridge 1 Wind facility is located between Goderich and Kincardine, Ontario. The Kingsbridge 1 Wind facility is located on the southeast shore of Lake Huron in the township of Ashfield-Colborne-Wawanosh and consists of 22 1.8 MW Vestas V80 wind turbines with a capacity of 39.6 MW. Each tower is over 78 meters tall and weigh around 195 metric tonnes. The project consists of two phases and currently provides power to on average 12,500 homes.

In 2004, the first phase was awarded a generation contract by the Government of Ontario as part of its renewable energy RFP. Construction has since been completed and the project is fully operational.

In 2005, the second phase received a generation contract from the provincial government.

Production (MWh)
Year	January	February	March	April	May	June	July	August	September	October	November	December	Total
2006			6,004	7,011	6,077	4,856	4,717	4,423	7,036	11,098	7,947	15,806	74,975
2007	13,365	14,892	13,290	10,904	6,811	5,240	4,305	4,603	8,019	11,193	12,454	13,365	90,184
2008	15,782	10,048	11,084	10,176	9,656	5,732	4,726	4,260	4,652	10,491	12,555	16,141	89,473
2009	11,119	10,943	10,317	12,645	9,209	2,984	2,928	5,956	4,899	10,166	9,018	12,364	80,486
2010	11,164	6,572	7,836	10,246	6,836	4,645	3,654	4,897	9,628	10,361	12,016	15,274	85,393
2011	8,975	12,026	9,155	10,862	7,435	5,546	3,229	2,633	6,041	8,789	14,781	11,697	80,168
2012	14,274	10,324	12,111	9,709	5,330	6,142	3,330						36,622

== See also ==
- List of wind farms in Canada.
