= Bloom Wind =

Wind farm in the US

Coordinates: 37.494°N 99.972°W

Bloom Wind is a 178 Megawatt wind farm in the American state of Kansas. The farm is situated on 15,000 acres of privately owned land near Dodge City.

== See also ==
- Wind power in Kansas
- Wind power in the United States
