= Shell Gas & Power =

Gas and power mining subsidiary of Shell plc

Shell Gas & Power International B.V.
- Company type: Subsidiary
- Industry: Mining
- Founded: 2003; 22 years ago
- Headquarters: The Hague, Netherlands
- Parent: Shell plc

Shell Gas & Power International B.V. is a Dutch mining company established in 2003. The company is a subsidiary of Shell plc and headquartered in The Hague.

Shell handled its energy and natural gas trading through its Shell trading brand and its then subsidiary, Coral Energy, LLC, which was a primary marketer of financial and physical power in the western United States (WECC), Texas (ERCOT), and Canada. They were also one of the largest natural gas providers to the western United States, having a very strong retail presence.

In November 2007, Shell announced that it would merge its US-based Coral Energy companies into "Shell Energy North America". The merge completed in 2008, involved all the Coral companies including Coral Energy Resources, Coral Power, Coral Management and Coral Gas Marketing. Shell Energy North America was established as a wholly owned subsidiary of Royal Dutch Shell, headquartered in Houston.

== Power plants ==
Coral Energy contracted and built a number of peaker plants and owns the rights to other generation as well. The company's plants included:

- Brighton Beach Generating Station (541.3 megawatts), natural gas fired, combined cycle unit
- Wildflower
  - Larkspur (90 megawatts), natural gas peaker plants
  - Indigo (135 megawatts), natural gas peaker plants
- La Rosita (1,056 megawatts), natural gas fired, combined Cycle unit. 500MW is contracted to CFE.
