= Calgary Energy Centre =

Power plant in Calgary

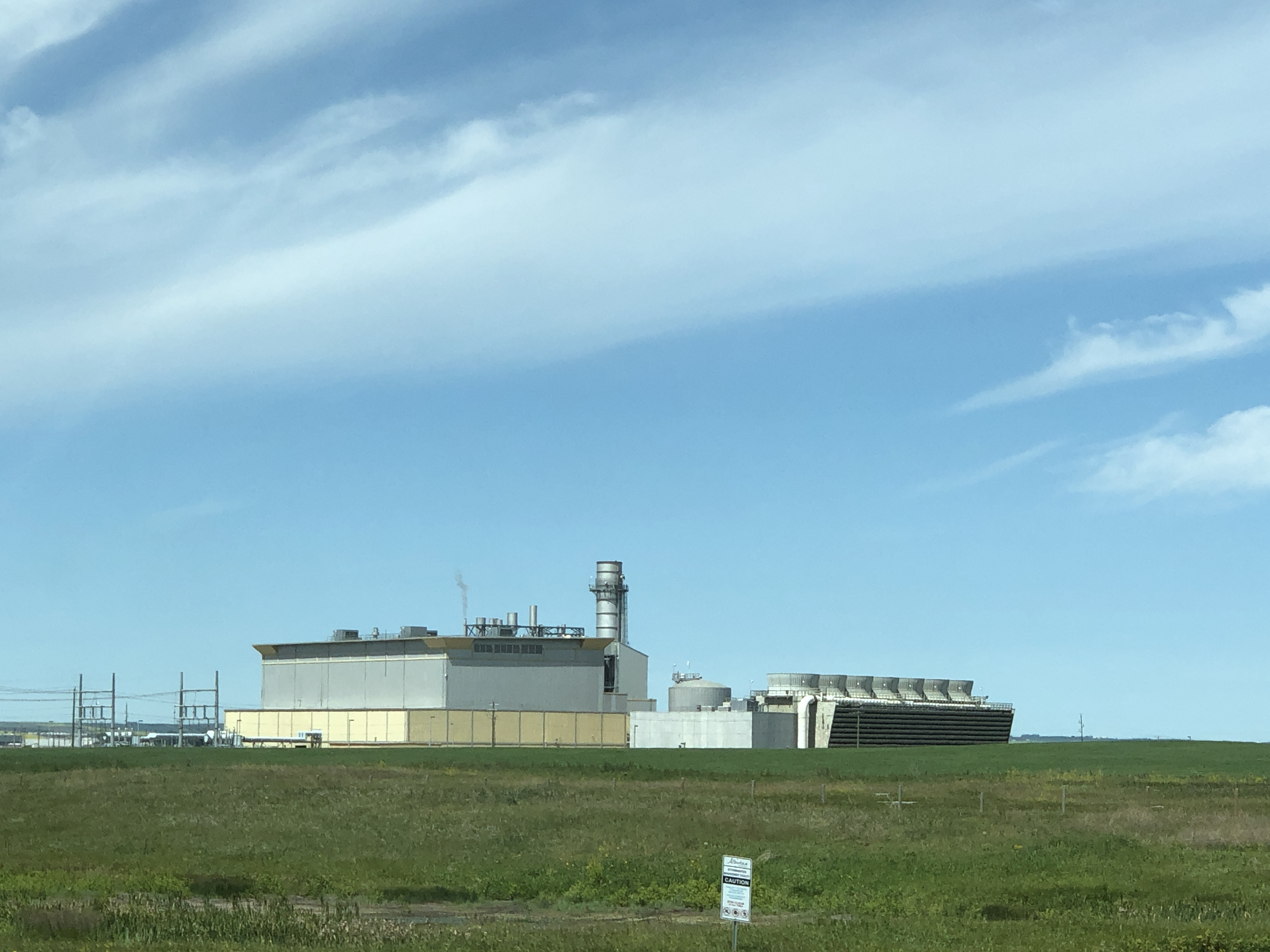
- Calgary Energy Centre as viewed from Stoney Trail.
- Country: Canada
- Location: Calgary, Alberta
- Coordinates: 51.1803°N 113.9368°W
- Status: Operational
- Commission date: 2003
- Owner: ENMAX
- Operator: ENMAX

Thermal power station
- Primary fuel: Natural gas
- Turbine technology: Gas turbine
- Combined cycle?: Yes: Steam Turbine

Power generation
- Nameplate capacity: 320 MW

External links
- Commons: Related media on Commons

The Calgary Energy Centre is a combined cycle power plant located on the northeast corner of Calgary, Alberta. Powered by a single Siemens Westinghouse (Siemens Energy, Inc.) W501-FD2 combustion turbine, the waste heat is then ducted into a Heat Recovery Steam Generator from Nooter/Eriksen. This steam is then used to power a steam turbine built by Fuji Electric.,
