= Joffre Cogeneration Plant =

- Country: Canada
- Location: Joffre, Alberta
- Coordinates: 52°18′24″N 113°33′16″W
- Status: Operational
- Commission date: 2000
- Owners: 40% Heartland Generation Ltd. 40% Capital Power; 20% Nova Chemicals

Thermal power station
- Primary fuel: Natural gas

Power generation
- Nameplate capacity: 480 MW

Joffre Cogeneration Plant is a natural gas power station owned by Heartland Generation Ltd. (40%), Capital Power (40%) and Nova Chemicals (20%). The plant is located in Joffre, Alberta, Canada, near Red Deer. The plant is primarily used to supply steam to the adjacent Nova Chemicals processing plant.

== Description ==
The plant consists of:

- Two Westinghouse CTSD W501 F Gas Turbines
- Two Nooter/Eriksen Heat Recovery Steam Generators
- One Toshiba Steam Turbine
