= GTAA Cogeneration Plant =

Power station in Mississauga, Ontario, Canada

- Country: Canada
- Location: Mississauga, Ontario
- Coordinates: 43°41′30.04″N 79°36′36.55″W
- Status: Operational
- Commission date: February 1, 2006
- Owner: Greater Toronto Airports Authority

Thermal power station
- Primary fuel: Natural gas
- Cogeneration?: Yes

Power generation
- Units operational: 2+1 CCGT with LM6000PD gas tur
- Nameplate capacity: 117 MW

GTAA Cogeneration Plant is a combined cycle natural gas and steam power station owned by the Greater Toronto Airports Authority, in Mississauga, Ontario. The plant is primarily used to supply steam (for heating and cooling) and power to the Toronto Pearson International Airport with surplus power sold onto the Ontario grid. The plant is located across from the airport at Elmbank Road and Network Road next to the Central Utilities Plant.

== Description ==
The plant consists of:

- 117-MW, 2+1 CCGT with LM6000PD gas turbines

== See also ==
- TransAlta Mississauga Cogeneration Plant - formerly located at Derry Road and Airport Road within the airport and next to the former McDonnell Douglas plant, now demolished.
