= Atlantic Power Corporation =

North American infrastructure company

- Traded as: NYSE: AT; TSX: ATP
- Industry: Electric utility
- Founded: 2004
- Fate: Acquired by I Squared Capital in 2021
- Headquarters: Dedham, Massachusetts, U.S.
- Area served: United States, Canada
- Key people: James Moore (CEO)
- Products: Electricity generation
- Website: www.atlanticpower.com

Atlantic Power Corporation, headquartered in Dedham, Massachusetts, is a power generation and infrastructure company with a portfolio of assets in the United States and Canada. The company is engaged in power generation through hydro, natural gas, biomass, and coal-fired power plants. The company was acquired by private equity firm I Squared Capital in 2021 and delisted from the New York and Toronto stock exchanges.
