= North Battleford Energy Centre =

- Country: Canada
- Location: R. M. of North Battleford, Saskatchewan
- Coordinates: 52.6833°N 108.1717°W
- Status: Operational
- Commission date: June 5, 2013
- Owner: Northland Power

Thermal power station
- Primary fuel: Natural gas
- Turbine technology: Gas turbine

Power generation
- Nameplate capacity: 260 MW

North Battleford Energy Centre is a natural gas-fired station owned by Northland Power located in the Rural Municipality of North Battleford, Saskatchewan located near the city of North Battleford, Saskatchewan, Canada. The plant is operating under a 20-year power purchase agreement with SaskPower. Construction started on the project in June 2010, and the plant commenced commercial operations on June 5, 2013. The plant was built by Kiewit Construction. Construction of the centre was expected to cost $700M.

== Description ==
The Power Station consists of one 170 MW gas turbine (supplied by General Electric), that in a combined cycle configuration also generates steam for a steam turbine (supplied by Alstom Power), resulting in a combined total of 260 MW.
