= Capital Power =

Canadian power generation

- Type: Public
- Traded as: TSX: CPX
- Industry: Power Generation
- Headquarters: Edmonton, Alberta, Canada
- Area served: North America
- Key people: Avik Dey (CEO)
- Services: Electricity
- Revenue: ▲CAD$ 2,929 million (2022)
- Operating income: ▲CAD$ 1,353 million (2022)
- Net income: ▲CAD$ 128 million (2022)
- Total assets: ▲CAD$ 5,393 million (2022)
- Number of employees: 813 (as of December 31, 2018)
- Website: www.capitalpower.com

Capital Power is a Canadian independent power generation company based in Edmonton, Alberta, Canada. It develops, acquires, owns and operates power generation facilities using a variety of energy sources.

== History ==
The company history dates back to Edmonton Electric Lighting and Power Company formed in 1891. Previously named Edmonton Power, then EPCOR Generation (a division of EPCOR Utilities), Capital Power was created through issuance of a 25 percent IPO by EPCOR Utilities in 2009.

The Clover Bar Landfill Gas facility was commissioned in 2005. The facility utilizes landfill gas from the City of Edmonton's Waste Management Centre and output from the facility is sold to the City of Edmonton.

In October 2010, Capital Power acquired the Island Generation Facility, a 275 megawatt (MW), gas-fired combined cycle power plant at Campbell River, British Columbia, from Kelson Canada.

In September 2011, Capital Power and TransAlta completed the 495 MW (gross) Keephills 3 generating facility and announced the commencement of commercial operation at the facility.

In November 2011, Atlantic Power Corporation acquired Capital Power Income. As part of the arrangement, Capital Power acquired CPILP's Roxboro and Southport plants in North Carolina.

In October 2012, Innergex Renewable Energy Inc. acquired Capital Power's Brown Lake, B.C., and Miller Creek, B.C. hydro facilities.

In November 2012, Capital Power's 142 MW Quality Wind project, located in British Columbia, began commercial operation.

In December 2012, Capital Power and ENMAX Corporation announced the signing of a joint venture agreement to build, own and operate the 800 MW Shepard Energy Centre in Calgary.

In November 2013, Emera Inc. acquired Capital Power's facilities in Connecticut: Bridgeport, Rhode Island: Tiverton, and Maine: Rumford, including certain emissions credits. These facilities were subsequently sold by Emera to the Carlyle Group.

In February 2017, Capital Power entered into an agreement to acquire the thermal power business of Veresen, consisting of two gas-fired generation facilities and two waste heat assets.

In March 2017, Capital Power and ENMAX Corporation announced that the Shepard Energy Centre was chosen as the test site for the natural gas track of the $20 million NRG COSIA Carbon XPRIZE, a global competition to develop breakthrough technologies that convert carbon dioxide (CO_{2}) into valuable products. Shepard Energy Centre will host the new Alberta Carbon Conversion Technology Centre, as well as provide the flue gas for testing during the NRG COSIA Carbon XPRIZE and for future innovators.

In June 2017, Capital Power's Bloom Wind project, located in Kansas began commercial operation.

In October 2023, Capital Power announced that it would acquire 50.15 percent stake in the Frederickson 1 Generating Station, a natural gas-fired combined-cycle generation facility located in Pierce County, Washington. The acquisition was completed in December 2023.

In November 2023, Capital Power announced that it would acquire two natural gas-fired generation facilities: the 1,092 MW Harquahala facility in Arizona, and the 1,062 MW La Paloma facility in California for $1.1 billion. Both acquisitions were completed in February 2024.

== Operations ==
=== In operation ===
- 150 Mile House Waste Heat in British Columbia, Canada
- Arlington Valley in Arizona, United States
- Beaufort Solar in North Carolina, United States
- Buckthorn Wind in Texas, United States
- Bloom Wind in Kansas, United States
- Cardinal Point Wind in Illinois, United States
- Clover Bar Energy Centre in Alberta, Canada
- Clover Bar Landfill Gas Plant in Alberta, Canada
- Clydesdale Solar in Alberta, Canada
- Decatur Energy Center in Alabama, United States
- Genesee Generating Station in Alberta, Canada
- Goreway Power Station in Ontario, Canada
- Halkirk Wind in Alberta, Canada
- Island Generating Station in British Columbia, Canada
- Joffre Cogeneration Plant in Alberta, Canada
- Kingsbridge Wind Power Project in Ontario, Canada
- Macho Springs Wind in New Mexico, United States
- Midland Cogeneration Venture in Michigan, United States
- New Frontier Wind in North Dakota, United States
- Port Dover and Nanticoke Wind in Ontario, Canada
- Quality Wind in British Columbia, Canada
- Savona Waste Heat in British Columbia, Canada
- Shepard Energy Centre in Alberta, Canada
- Strathmore Solar in Alberta, Canada
- Whitla Wind Project in Alberta, Canada
- York Energy Centre in Ontario, Canada
- Harquahala Natural Gas Generation Station in Arizona
- La Paloma Combined Cycle Gas Generation Station in Kern County, California
- Frederickson 1 Generating Station in Pierce County, Washington.

=== Under construction ===
- Genesee Generating Station Repowering Genesee 1 & 2

=== In development ===
- Bear Branch Solar in North Carolina, United States
- East Windsor Generation Facility Expansion
- Goreway – Battery Energy Storage System in Ontario, Canada
- Goreway Power Station – Upgrades Project in Ontario, Canada
- Halkirk 2 Wind in Alberta, Canada

== See also ==
- EPCOR Utilities Incorporated
