= Greenfield Energy Centre =

Natural gas-fired power station in Courtright, Ontario

- Country: Canada
- Location: Courtright, Ontario
- Coordinates: 42°45′44″N 82°27′09″W
- Status: Operational
- Commission date: October 2008
- Owners: Calpine (50%); Mitsui (50%)

Thermal power station
- Primary fuel: Natural gas
- Cooling source: St. Clair River
- Combined cycle?: Yes

Power generation
- Nameplate capacity: 1,005 MW

External links
- Website: www.calpine.com/Greenfield-Energy-Centre

Greenfield Energy Centre is a natural gas-fired power station located in Courtright, Ontario. It produces 1,005 MW of electricity and is the second largest natural gas-fired power plant in Canada. It is the largest privately owned and operated gas power plant in Ontario.

Greenfield consists of three Siemens Westinghouse gas turbine generators, a single 517 MW Toshiba steam turbine generator, and three Deltek heat recovery steam generators.

== See also ==
- List of largest power stations in Canada
- List of natural gas-fired power stations in Canada
