= Goreway Power Station =

Natural gas power station in Brampton, Ontario, Canada

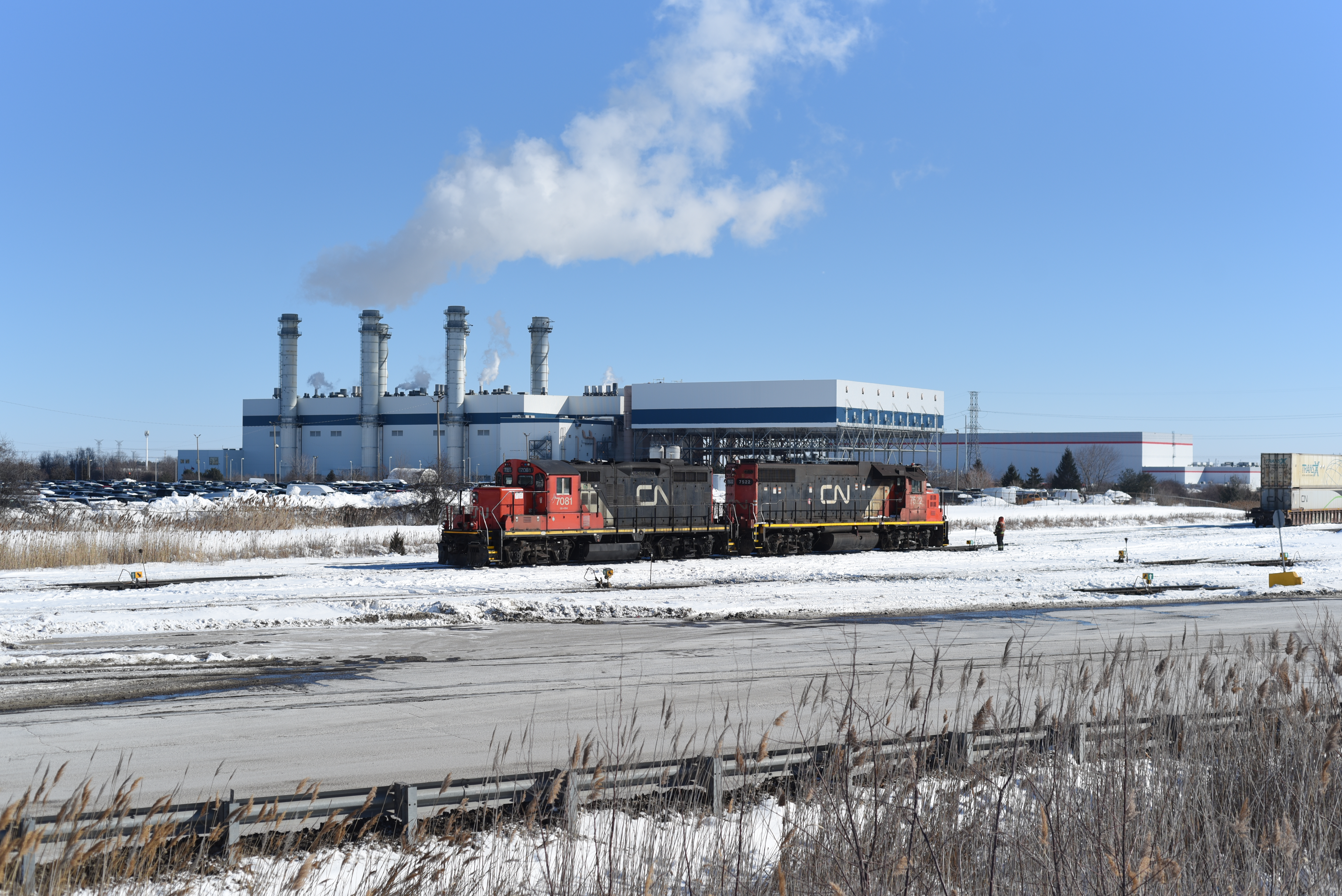
- Country: Canada
- Location: Brampton, Ontario
- Coordinates: 43°44′46″N 79°40′48″W
- Status: Operational
- Construction began: 4 Apr 2006
- Commission date: 11 Jun 2009
- Construction cost: $1.1 billion CAD
- Owner: Capital Power Corporation

Thermal power station
- Primary fuel: Natural gas
- Cooling source: Air cooling
- Combined cycle?: Yes

Power generation
- Units operational: 3 × GE 7001FB gas turbines 1 × Siemens SST-5000 steam turbine
- Nameplate capacity: 875 MW

External links
- Commons: Related media on Commons

Goreway Power Station is a natural gas power station in Brampton, Ontario. It is owned by Capital Power. Gas is supplied by underground pipelines from a nearby Enbridge facility.

== Description ==
At 875 MW the plant is the second largest gas fired station in Canada behind the Greenfield Energy Centre in Courtright, Ontario and consists of:

- 3+1 CCGT with General Electric 7001FB gas turbines

== History ==
The Goreway Power Station was developed by Sithe Global Power, a subsidiary of Blackstone Inc. Sithe entered into a twenty-year production agreement with the Ontario Power Authority (OPA) to supply electricity to the Greater Toronto Area. Construction of the $942 million facility began in late 2005 and was expected to be completed by June 2007, with full combined cycle operations to begin in July 2008. Construction was financed by TD Securities and RBC Capital Markets and the plant was built by SNC-Lavalin. In 2007, SNC-Lavalin told Sithe that it could not complete construction on time due to the bankruptcy of an equipment supplier.

The power station entered service on 11 June 2009.

In 2015, Goreway had settled with the Independent Electricity System Operator (IESO) to repay an undisclosed amount for exploiting loopholes in the wholesale energy market over several years. In 2017, the Ontario Energy Board reported that Goreway had benefitted by approximately $120 million. Ontario Energy Minister Glenn Thibeault reported that Goreway had repaid $91 million out of a $100 million repayment penalty. Goreway was also fined $10 million.

In 2023, Capital Power sought to increase the capacity of the power plant by 40 MW. The proposed increase is intended to be achieved through upgrades to parts within the gas turbine. The proposal was criticised by environmentalists for threatening "Brampton's goal of reducing corporate greenhouse gas emissions by 45 per cent by 2030." However, the IESO defended the proposed expansion on the grounds that there were "no like-for-like replacements with similar operating flexibility for natural gas generation."

In October 2023, the Toronto Star reported that the Goreway plant, which was intended to only operate during peak periods of electricity demands, had been running for 10–15 hours each day between 2019 and 2023.

=== Ownership ===
On 4 September 2009, Chubu Electric Power and Toyota Tsusho each acquired a 25 per cent stake in Sithe Global Power. On 3 March 2011, Sithe Global Power announced that it had sold its remaining 50 per cent stake to Chubu Electric and Toyota Tsusho. In June 2019, Capital Power acquired the power station from Goreway Power Station Holdings Inc., a joint venture of JERA and Toyota Tsusho. The transaction was valued at ¥32 billion (US$289 million).
