= Shepard Energy Centre =

Power plant in Alberta, Canada (commissioned 2015)

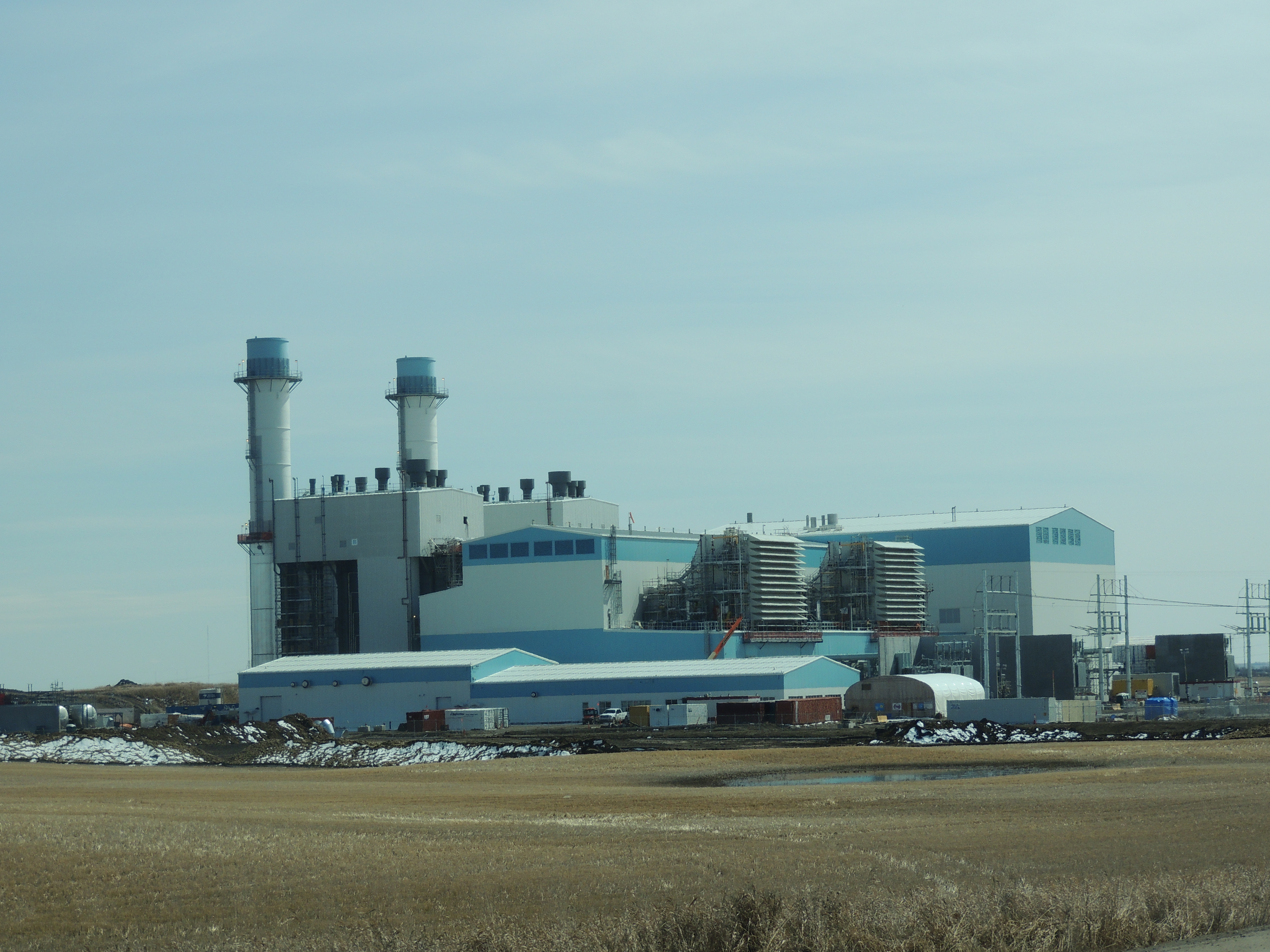
- Country: Canada
- Location: Calgary, Alberta
- Coordinates: 50°58′15″N 113°53′07″W
- Status: Operational
- Commission date: 2015
- Owners: ENMAX (50%); Capital Power (50%)

Thermal power station
- Primary fuel: Natural gas
- Turbine technology: Gas turbine
- Combined cycle?: Yes: Steam Turbine

Power generation
- Nameplate capacity: 860 MW

The Shepard Energy Centre is an 860 MW combined-cycle power plant located on the east side of Calgary, Alberta. It is powered by two gas turbine generators, with two HRSGs capturing the waste heat from the exhaust-gases and producing steam for a single steam turbine generator.

ENMAX claims the Shepard Energy Centre emits less than half of the carbon dioxide per MW of traditional coal power-plants.

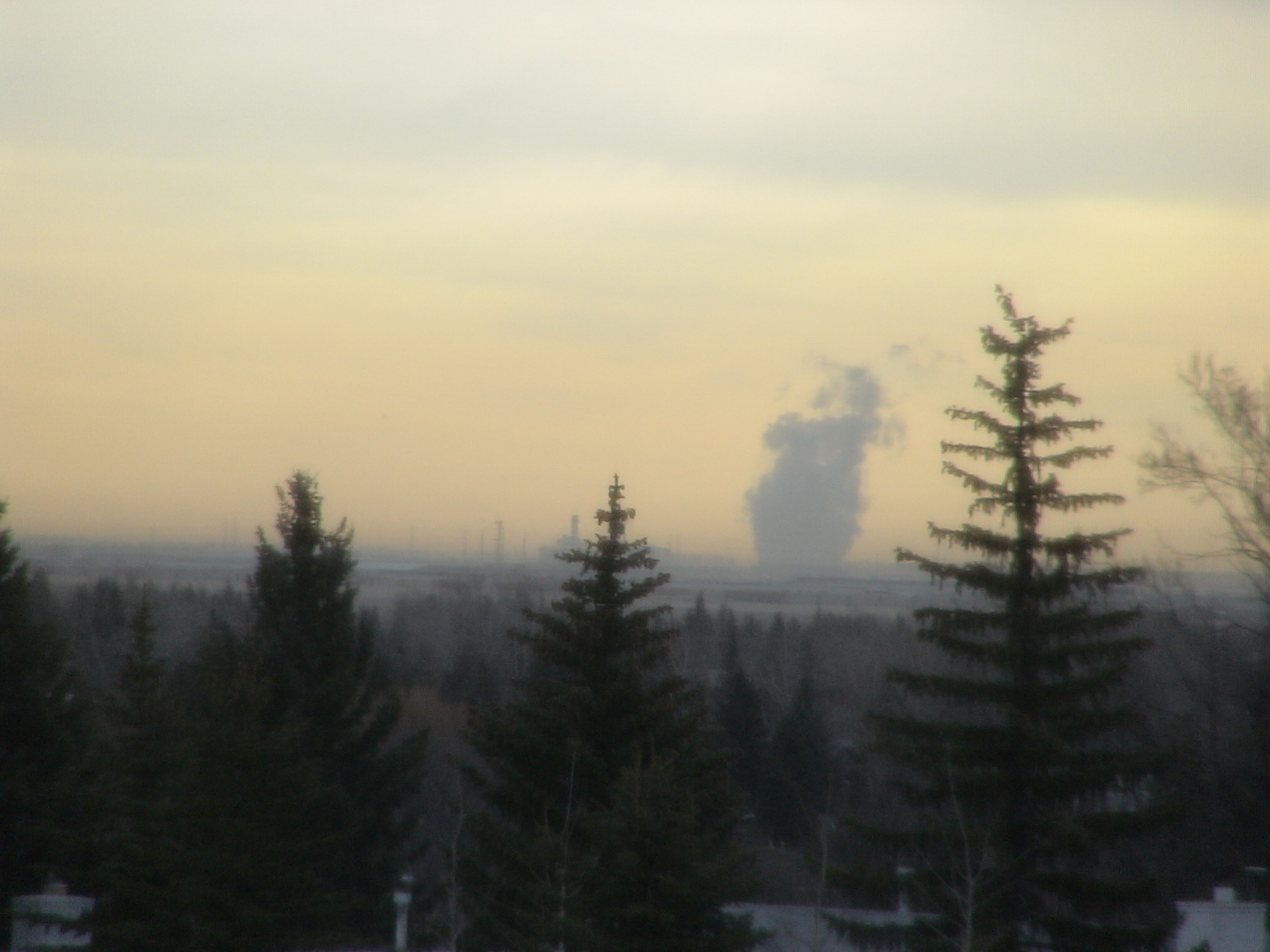
Image taken 14 km (8.7 mi) West of the plant, shortly after sunrise, showing the large vapour column produced.

== History ==
The project was announced by Enmax in 2007. Construction began in October 2011. The plant was announced fully operational in March 2015.

== Cost ==
The plant reportedly cost CA$1.4 billion (equivalent to $1.9 billion in 2025). In December 2012, Capital Power Corporation of Edmonton agreed to pay ENMAX $860 million (equivalent to $1.2 billion in 2025) for a 50% ownership share.
