= Thorold Cogeneration Station =

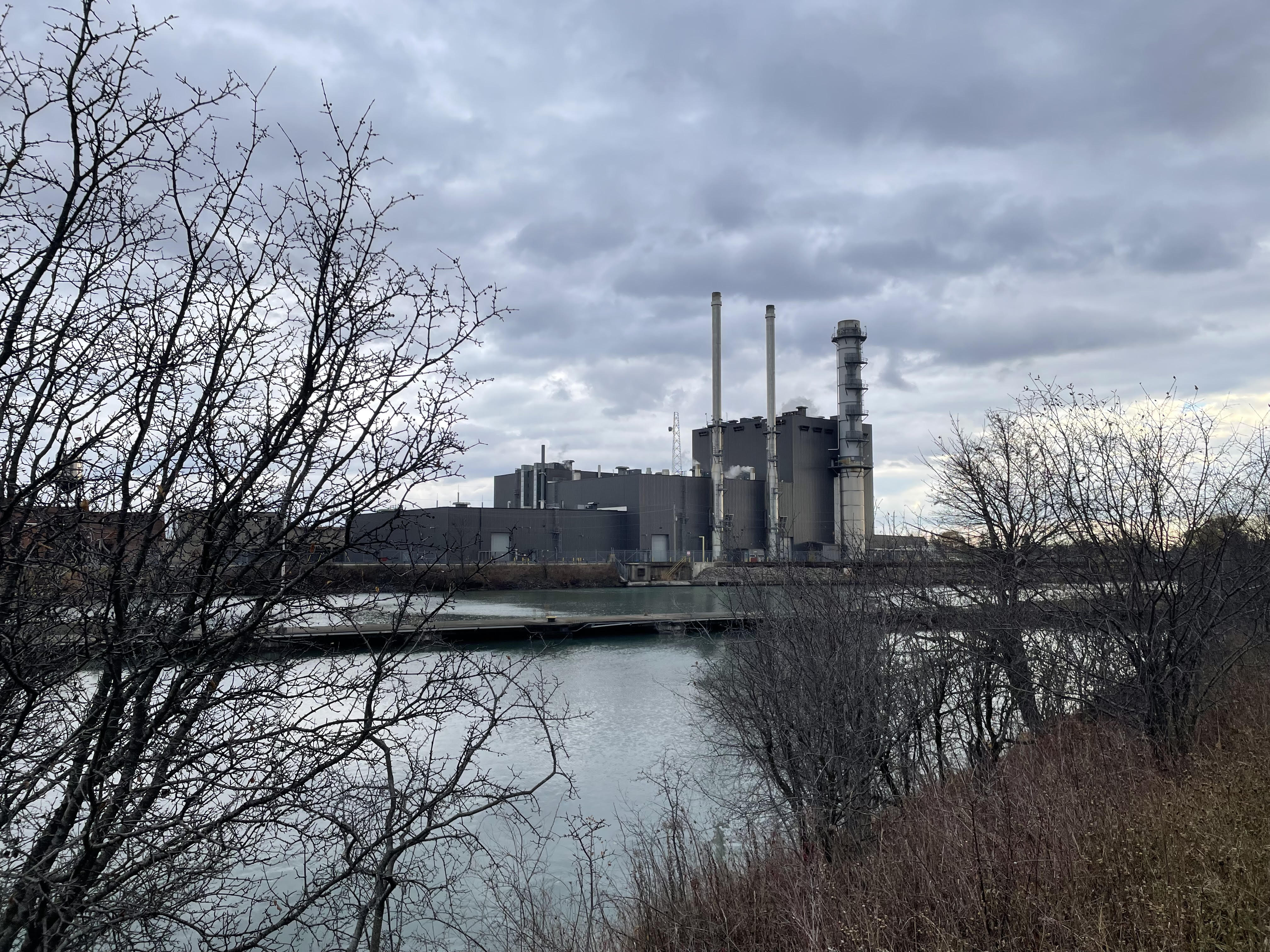
- The Thorold Cogeneration Station seen from the Welland Canal Trail in November 2025
- Country: Canada
- Location: Thorold, Ontario
- Coordinates: 43°06′25″N 79°11′55″W
- Status: Operational
- Construction began: 2007
- Commission date: 2010
- Construction cost: $520 million CAD
- Owner: Northland Power

Thermal power station
- Primary fuel: Natural gas
- Secondary fuel: Landfill gas
- Turbine technology: Gas turbine / Steam turbine
- Cooling source: Welland Canal
- Combined cycle?: Yes
- Cogeneration?: Yes

Power generation
- Units operational: 1 × 170 MW GE 7FA gas turbine 1 × Alstom fired HRSG; 1 × 95 MW Siemens SST-900-RH steam turbine 1 × Shin Nippon 9 MW steam turbine 2 × Foster Wheeler auxiliary boilers
- Nameplate capacity: 265 MW

The Thorold Cogeneration Station is a natural gas-fired station owned by Northland Power, brought into operation on March 28, 2010. The plant formerly supplied steam to the nearby AbitibiBowater paper mill before the mill was indefinitely idled in March 2017. Power is produced under contract to the Ontario Power Authority.

== Description ==
The Power Station consists of one 170 MW gas turbine, supplied by General Electric, that in a combined cycle configuration also generates steam for a steam turbine, resulting in a combined total of 265 MW. The plant uses both natural gas and landfill gas. In addition to power generation, the Thorold Plant includes two Natural Gas/Waste Gas fired boilers which will provide necessary steam to the paper mill when the Gas Turbine is not in service.
