= Enmax =

Calgary, Alberta municipal energy utility

Enmax Corporation
- Type: Municipally owned corporation
- Industry: Utilities
- Founded: Calgary, Alberta, Canada, 1905
- Headquarters: Calgary, Alberta, Canada
- Key people: Mark Poweska-President and CEO
- Revenue: ▲3.66 billion CAD (2022)
- Net income: ▲296 million CAD (2022)
- Owner: City of Calgary
- Website: www.enmax.com

Enmax Corporation (often styled as ENMAX) is a vertically-integrated utility provider with operations across Alberta, Canada, and in Maine, United States.

Through its subsidiaries, ENMAX Power Corporation and Versant Power, ENMAX owns and operates transmission and distribution utilities that deliver electricity to customers in Calgary, and northern and eastern Maine. Through ENMAX Energy Corporation, ENMAX owns and operates power generation facilities and offers electricity and natural gas products and services to residential, commercial and industrial customers across Alberta.

== Overview ==
Enmax, headquartered in Calgary, Alberta, is a private corporation and the Calgary City Council is its sole shareholder.

According to their 2022 Financial Report, in 2022, ENMAX generated net earnings of $296 million and declared a dividend to The City of Calgary in the amount of $82 million. ENMAX’s core operations are organized into three main business segments: ENMAX Power, Versant Power and ENMAX Energy. A Corporate segment provides financing and shared corporate services to the operating segments.

== History ==
In 1904, The City of Calgary built its own electric plant when its contract with a private supplier ended. The City of Calgary Electric System began operating on December 2, 1905. In 1996, City Council approved a proposal to make The City of Calgary Electric System a wholly owned subsidiary Enmax Corporation commencing on January 1, 1998. This subsidiary and an affiliated retailer, "Enmax Energy", was incorporated on January 1, 1998. January 1, 2001, Enmax Energy entered the restructured, deregulated electric marketplace in Alberta.

== Enmax Power regulated operations ==
ENMAX Power Corporation (EPC), owns and operates electricity transmission and distribution assets that serve the Calgary area.

It also delivers project execution for customer infrastructure in areas such as power infrastructure, light rail transit and commercial and residential development.

Enmax Power is regulated by the Alberta Utilities Commission. Covering 1,089 square kilometers in Calgary and surrounding areas, ENMAX Power’s system consists of approximately 335 km of transmission wires and 8,629 km of distribution lines in Calgary and surrounding areas, with 40 high voltage and three lower voltage distribution substations powering residences and businesses within Calgary city limits.

== Enmax Energy Corporation ==
ENMAX Energy Corporation (EEC) is the generation and energy retail services arm of ENMAX that offers electricity, natural gas, distributed energy resource solutions and customer care services to customers throughout Alberta. Enmax Energy also carries out retail energy supply and related functions for the Calgary Regulated Rate Option (RRO).

The competitive retail business provides customers with either fixed or variable-priced electricity and natural gas and offers additional energy services. Natural gas retail contracts are backed by market transactions to provide supply certainty, margin stability and risk mitigation. Natural gas fuel requirements for the generation portfolio are balanced through the purchase and sale of natural gas in the Alberta market.

Current operating facilities include Cavalier Energy Centre, Crossfield Energy Centre, Calgary Energy Centre, and Shepard Energy Centre. ENMAX Energy’s owned generation also includes 100 per cent ownership of the 81 MW Taber wind farm and 63 MW Kettles Hill wind farm, and a 50 per cent interest in the 73 MW McBride Lake wind farm, all located in southern Alberta.

== Additional Enmax subsidiaries ==
Enmax Energy provides the "Easymax" option for residential and small business customers. Easymax is an electricity and gas energy plan for residential and small business customers.

Enmax Encompass Inc., a subsidiary of Enmax Corporation, provides billing and customer care services to residential and small commercial customers. Enmax Encompass is also contracted to perform customer service, water meter reading and billing services to The City of Calgary and other municipalities across the province.

Enmax Envision Inc., a subsidiary of Enmax Corporation, provided commercial high-speed data and internet services primarily in Calgary. Enmax sold its Envision subsidiary to Shaw Communications Inc. in April 2013 for $225 Million.

ENMAX Corporation and Emera Inc. announced a definitive agreement on March 25, 2019 in which Emera agreed to sell to ENMAX its interest in Emera Maine, its regulated electric transmission and distribution company in Maine. The purchase completed March 25, 2020. Emera Maine was renamed and rebranded Versant Power in May 2020.

Versant Power owns and operates electricity transmission and distribution assets that provide service to customers in the Maine Public District and Bangor Hydro District, covering six counties in Maine. Versant Power is regulated by the Maine Public Utilities Commission and the United States Federal Energy Regulatory Commission.

== District Energy Centre ==
The Calgary District Energy Centre began operations in March 2010, capable of providing heat for up to 10 million square feet of buildings. The facility incorporates high efficiency boilers fueled by natural gas. Customers are connected to the facility through an underground thermal distribution system, which occupies significantly less space than a traditional heating system.

ENMAX entered into a definitive agreement to sell District Energy Centre to Atlantica Sustainable Infrastructure PLC in November 2020. The sale closed in early 2021.

== Shepard Energy Centre ==
Located on a 60-acre site east of Calgary, the Shepard Energy Centre is Alberta's largest natural gas-fueled power generating facility. Using combined-cycle technology, two natural gas-fueled turbines and one steam turbine provide more than 860 megawatts (MW) of electrical power to the provincial grid, enough to meet almost half of Calgary's current needs. Shepard uses reclaimed water from the City of Calgary's Bonnybrook Wastewater Treatment Plant for its process requirements and emits less than half the carbon dioxide per MW of conventional coal plants.

Capital Power owns a 50 per cent interest in the Shepard Energy Centre through a joint venture agreement with ENMAX Energy Corporation, the facility operator.

== Electricity prices ==
=== The Regulated Rate Option (RRO) ===
The RRO is the default option if households and small businesses in Calgary do not choose an energy plan with a retail supplier. Prior to 2006 the price of electricity with the RRO would fluctuate quarterly or yearly. In July 2006 the Province of Alberta introduced new provincial regulations that meant that the Regulated Rate Option (RRO) for Calgary would fluctuate monthly.

"Prices change with the energy market, depending on changing weather, seasonal consumption demands and fuel costs such as natural gas prices. A new price for the RRO will be announced each month as these variations are incorporated in the price."

— Newswire 2007

== Bonnybrook Energy Centre ==
The Bonnybrook Energy Centre was a planned natural gas-fired cogeneration facility to be built in Calgary's southeast industrial zone. Bonnybrook had a planned capacity of 165 MW of electrical power, which is approximately half of downtown Calgary's energy requirements. This facility will reduce the amount of fresh water used by reusing industrial wastewater from the nearby Canada malting site and will play an integral role in heating office buildings in downtown Calgary. Bonnybrook will emit less than half of the carbon dioxide associated with conventional coal-fired facilities and will enhance the reliability of the region's power supply.

The project was delayed in 2015 and later appears to have been cancelled.

== Generate Choice ==
In 2011, Enmax Energy launched its Generate Choice, a program which offers Albertans home-based renewable energy choices such as solar power and wind generation. Response to the program has been poor: by August 2011, only 3,100 people even expressed interest in having a solar photo-voltaic (PV) system installed, and of those, only 172 agreed to have one installed.

This program is no longer available.

== Financial performance ==
Enmax is a wholly owned subsidiary of The City of Calgary. Since inception in 1998, Enmax has returned approximately $1.3 billion in dividends to The City of Calgary. Revenues increased from $3.1 billion in 2021 to $3.7 billion in 2022. In 2022, the company generated net earnings of $296 million and declared a dividend in the amount of $82 million to its Shareholder, The City of Calgary.

== Public involvement ==
Enmax has been named one of Alberta's Top 50 employers and one of Canada's Greenest Employers by MediaCorp.

== Controversy ==
In 2011, the CEO of Enmax, Gary Holden, resigned after controversial handling of travel expenses that violated the company's ethical guidelines.

== See also ==
- List of Canadian electric utilities
- Enmax Centre
- Enmax Centrium
- Electricity policy of Alberta

== Enmax publications cited ==
- Enmax-2022-ESG-Report
- Enmax-2022-Financial-Report
