= Brighton Beach Generating Station =

Natural gas power station

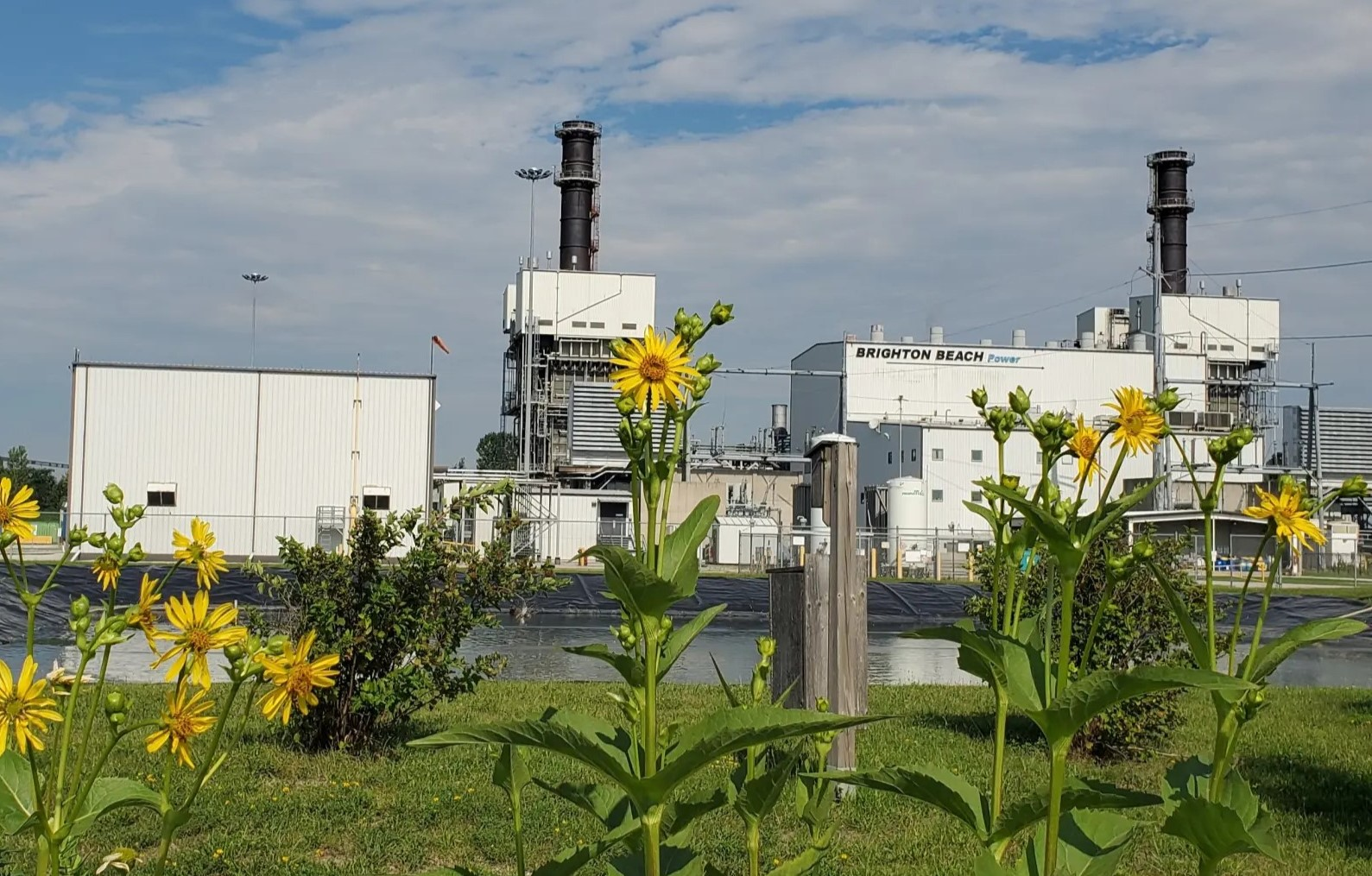
- Country: Canada
- Location: Windsor, Ontario
- Coordinates: 42°16′47″N 83°05′42″W
- Status: Operational
- Commission date: July 2004
- Owner: Atura Power (Ontario Power Generation)
- Operator: Atura Power

Thermal power station
- Primary fuel: Natural gas
- Cooling source: Detroit River
- Combined cycle?: Yes

Power generation
- Units operational: 3
- Make and model: 2 General Electric 7FA gas turbines 1 General Electric D11 condensing steam turbo generator
- Nameplate capacity: 570 MW

Brighton Beach Generating Station is a natural gas fired combined cycle fossil fuel power station in the Brighton Beach neighbourhood of Windsor, Ontario, Canada, owned by the Atura Power subsidiary of Ontario Power Generation. The electricity generated is under the control and marketing lead of Coral Energy Canada Inc. Gas for the plant is supplied by Union Gas, and cooling water is drawn from the Detroit River.

== Description ==
The plant consists of:

- Two General Electric 7FA gas turbine generators
- Two heat recovery steam generators (Austrian Energy & Environment)
- One General Electric D11 condensing steam turbine generator

Brighton Beach is connected to the Ontario grid via two 230 kV connections and one 115 kV connection, at the adjacent Keith transformer station owned by Hydro One Networks Inc.
