= York Energy Centre =

- Country: Canada
- Location: King, Ontario
- Coordinates: 44°04′32″N 79°31′54″W
- Status: Operational
- Owner: York Energy Centre LP
- Operator: Capital Power Corporation

Thermal power station
- Primary fuel: Natural gas

Power generation
- Units operational: 2
- Make and model: Siemens
- Nameplate capacity: 393 MW

External links
- Website: www.vereseninc.com/our-businesses/power/york-energy-centre.html

York Energy Centre is a power station owned by York Energy Centre LP situated on a 5-acre (12-hectare) lot in King, Ontario, Canada completed in 2012.

It is a simple cycle natural gas plant and is fed from Enbridge's Schomberg Gate Station via 16-inch (41 cm) diameter pipeline. It is primarily used as a peaking power plant, and is planned to operate 260 to 1,300 hours annually. The station is connected to the Holland Landing Transformer Station and further to Hydro One via 230 kV lines on circuit numbers B82V and B83V

== Description ==
The plant consists of two Siemens SGT6-PAC 5000F combustion turbines

The plant is a simple cycle plant; there are no boilers or steam utilized onsite. The plant connects to Hydro One's 230 kV electricity grid at B82 & B83 located between the Holland Marsh & Brownhill TS.
