= St. Clair Energy Centre =

- Country: Canada
- Location: St. Clair, Ontario
- Coordinates: 42.89645°N 82.39826°W
- Status: Operational
- Commission date: 30 March 2009
- Owner: St Clair Power LP
- Operator: Invenergy Services Canada

Thermal power station
- Primary fuel: Natural gas
- Combined cycle?: Yes

Power generation
- Nameplate capacity: 584 MW

The St. Clair Energy Centre is a natural gas power station in St. Clair, Ontario. The facility is owned by St Clair Power LP, a joint venture between Invenergy and the hedge fund Stark Investments, and operated by Invenergy Services Canada.

The plant was built in response to the Government of Ontario's 2004 initiative to produce lower-emission electricity, and has a 20-year contract from the Ontario Power Authority to provide electricity to the provincial power grid. The plant was partially built from equipment originally intended four-unit CCGT in Nelson Township, IL.

== Description ==
The plant consists of:

- Two GE 7FA combustion turbines
- Two General Electric A10 steam turbines
