= Sarnia Regional Cogeneration Plant =

- Country: Canada
- Location: Sarnia, Ontario
- Coordinates: 42°56′05″N 82°26′17″W
- Status: Operational
- Commission date: February 1, 2006
- Owner: TransAlta Energy

Thermal power station
- Primary fuel: Natural gas
- Combined cycle?: Yes
- Cogeneration?: Yes

Power generation
- Nameplate capacity: 444 MW

Sarnia Regional Cogeneration Plant is a natural gas power station owned by TransAlta Energy, in Sarnia, Ontario. The plant is primarily used to supply steam to Arlanxeo, Styrolution, Suncor and Nova Chemicals and power onto the Ontario Grid.

== Description ==
The plant consists of:

- Three Alstom gas turbines and Three Nooter-Eriksen supplementary fired heat recovery steam generators (HRSGs)
- Two Alstom and one Westinghouse steam turbines.
