= William Goldie (physician) =

Canadian physician (1873–1950)

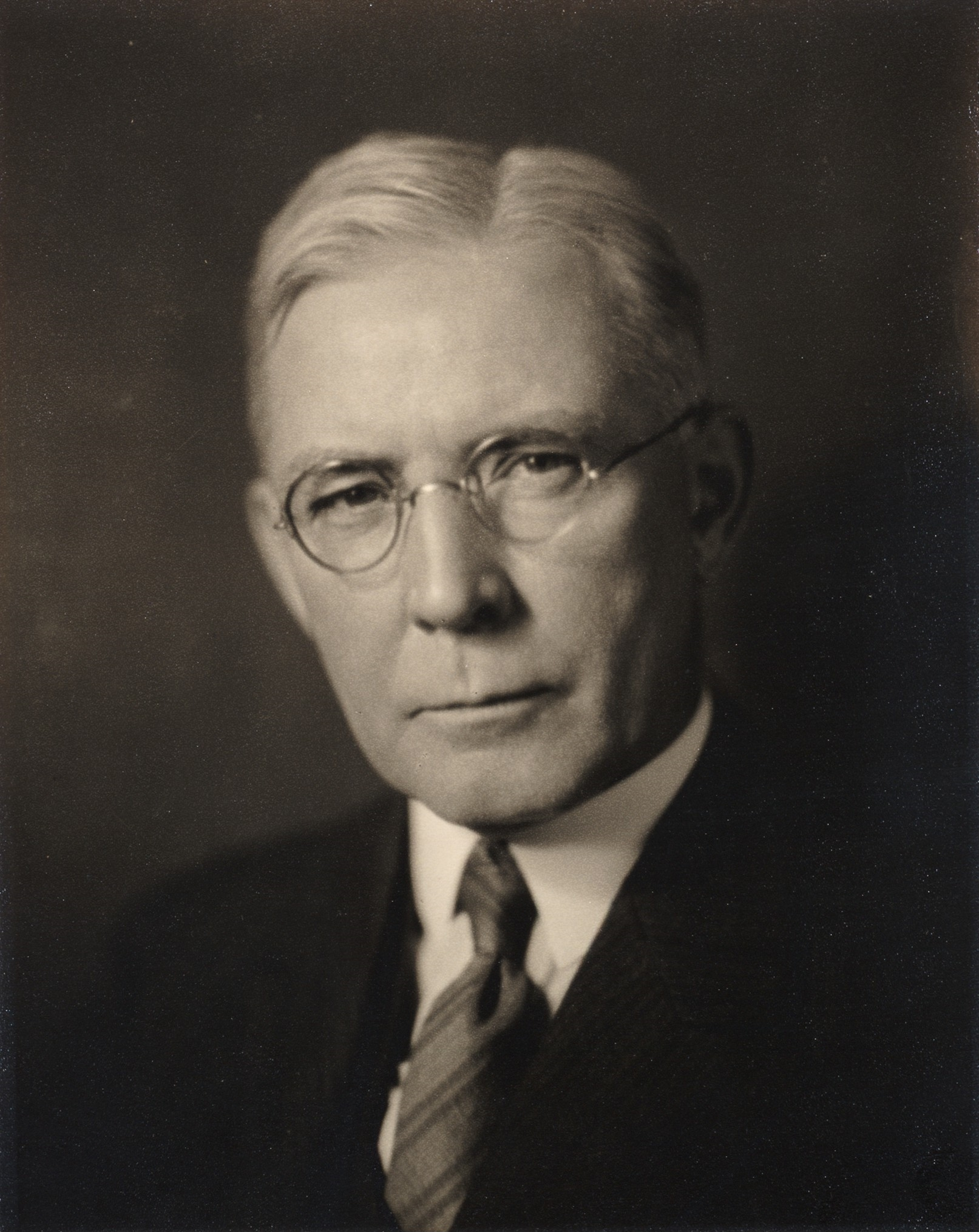
- Dr. William Goldie c.1930
- Born: December 15, 1873; Ayr, Ontario, Canada
- Died: January 8, 1950 (aged 76); Toronto, Ontario, Canada
- Education: University of Toronto
- Scientific career
- Institutions: University of Toronto; Toronto General Hospital; The Hospital for Sick Children

William A. Goldie (December 15, 1873 – January 8, 1950) was a Canadian physician and university lecturer. He is best known for helping to establish the first full-time chair in medicine in the British Empire, the Sir John and Lady Eaton Professor and Chair of Medicine, at the University of Toronto.

== Early life and education ==
Born in Ayr, Ontario to a family of millers, Goldie was the grandson of John Goldie, a Scottish-born botanist. He attended the Galt Collegiate Institute, and subsequently studied medicine at the University of Toronto.

== Career ==
Following his graduation from the University of Toronto in 1896, Goldie taught in the university's pathology and bacteriology departments, later transferring to the department of medicine. Goldie also took up positions as a clinician at the Toronto General Hospital and chief of the infection division at The Hospital for Sick Children. With the publication of the Flexner Report in 1910, he became an enthusiastic advocate for its recommendation that medical schools appoint full-time clinical professors. He convinced Sir Robert Falconer, President of the University of Toronto, and Sir Joseph Flavell, chairman of the Board of Directors of Toronto General Hospital, of the need for such an appointment in the Faculty of Medicine, and set about to secure the required funding.

=== The Sir John and Lady Eaton Professorship and Chair of Medicine ===
In 1918, Goldie persuaded two of his patients, Sir John and Lady Eaton, to donate $500,000 to establish the first endowed chair at the University of Toronto, and the first full-time Chair in Clinical Medicine in what was then the British Empire. Having declined the position himself, Goldie insisted that the position should be occupied by a younger physician rather than someone with an established reputation. That same year, Goldie travelled to Basingstoke where he met Dr. Duncan Archibald Graham at the No. 4 General Hospital there. Of Graham, Goldie wrote to Sir John that "he is not only respected but liked even though he is an exacting task-master." Graham became the first Sir John and Lady Eaton Professor of Medicine and Chair of the Department of Medicine. Subsequent Chairs have included Ray F. Farquharson (1947-1960), Charles H. Hollenberg (1970-1981), and Wendy Levinson (2004-2014).

=== Retirement ===
Goldie retired from the University of Toronto in 1929, continuing his private practice until 1947. He died from lung cancer in 1950, and his funeral was held at Convocation Hall. Of his death, Duncan Graham said: "He was a wonderful man. He retired when he did only to give younger men a chance for advancement."

=== Honors ===
In 1945, an anonymous donor established The William Goldie Prize and Travel Award at the University of Toronto, which is rewarded annually and consists of a commemorative certificate and travel grant.
