= Medical Sciences Building (University of Toronto) =

Building at the University of Toronto St. George

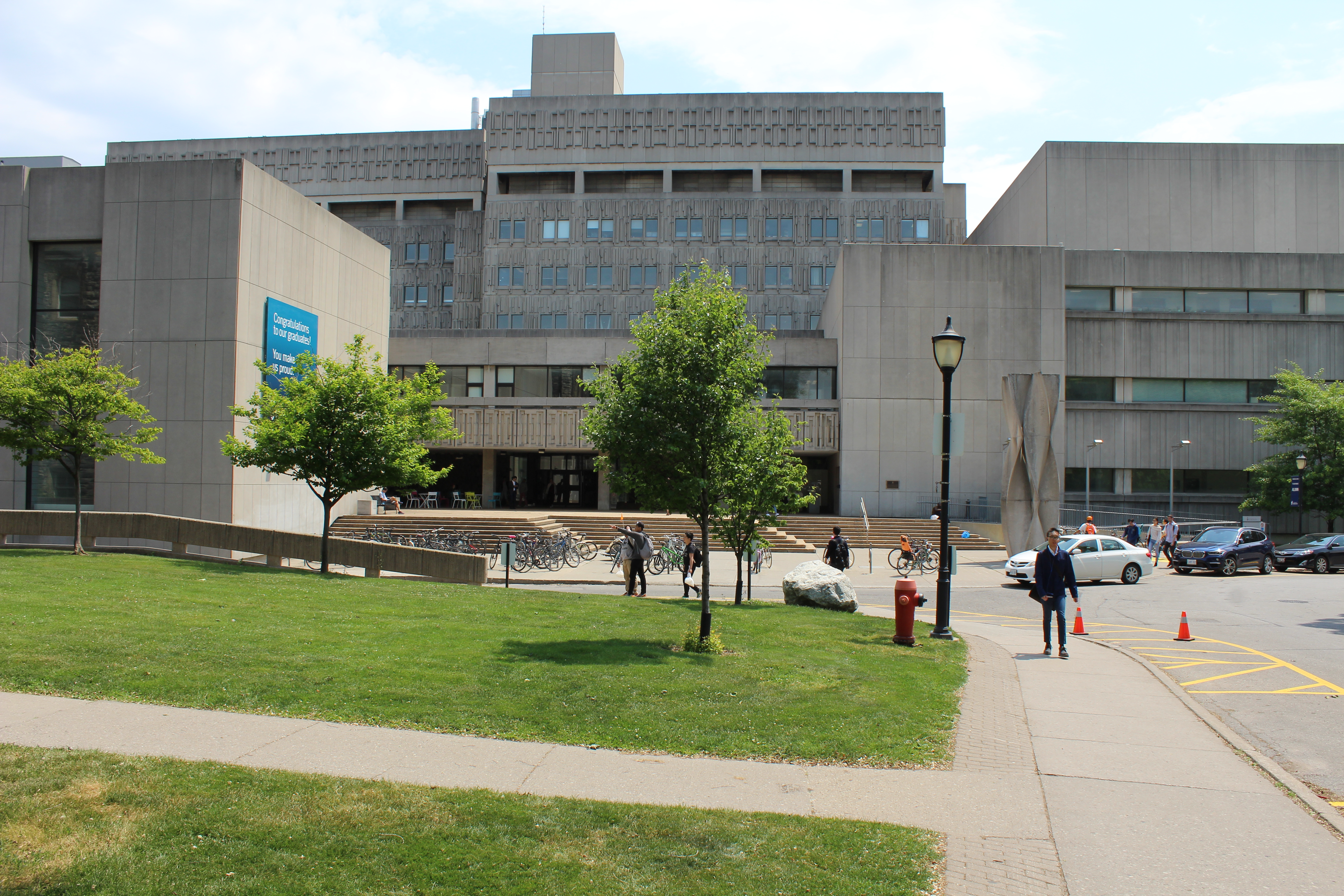
- Medical Sciences Building in 2018
- Interactive map of the Medical Sciences Building area

General information
- Location: 1 King's College Circle; Toronto, Ontario, Canada
- Coordinates: 43°39′39″N 79°23′37″W
- Current tenants: Temerty Faculty of Medicine
- Opening: 1969; 57 years ago
- Owner: University of Toronto

Technical details
- Floor area: 33,837m^{2}

Other information
- Public transit: Queen's Park; 506

Ontario Heritage Act
- Criteria: Designated Part IV
- Designated: Feb 4, 2026

The Medical Sciences Building (MSB) is the main building of the Temerty Faculty of Medicine, the medical school at the University of Toronto. It was built in 1969 within the historic King's College Circle on the St. George campus in downtown Toronto, Ontario, Canada. The large, predominantly concrete structure is exemplary of the Brutalist architectural style of the 1960s. The building is connected to several others along College Street including the Donnelly Centre for Cellular and Biomolecular Research.

The building is located in Toronto's Discovery District, home to several teaching hospitals partnered with the Temerty Faculty of Medicine, including Toronto General Hospital, Mount Sinai Hospital, and The Hospital for Sick Children (SickKids).

== History ==
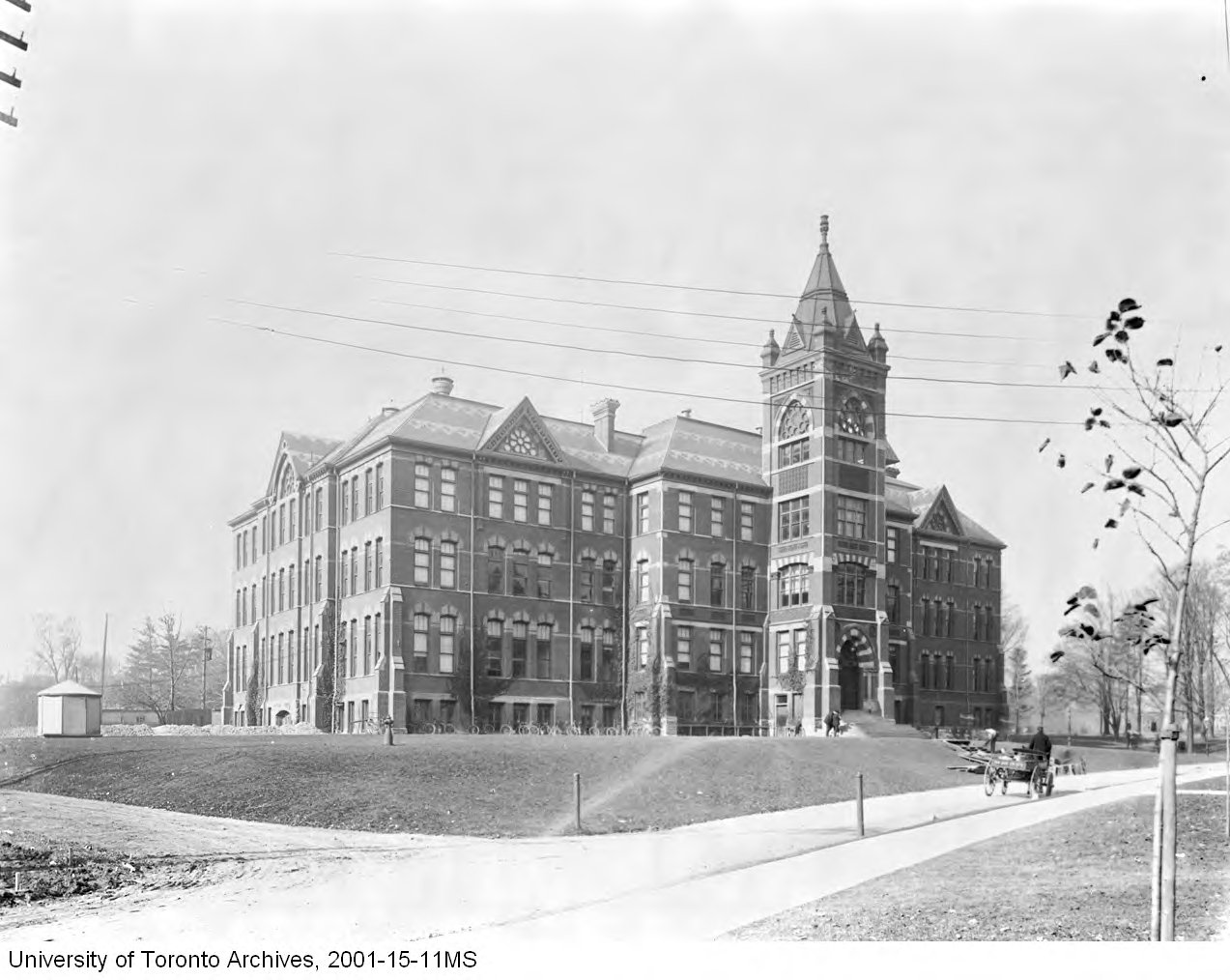
The original School of Practical Science "Skulehouse" building, demolished to build the MSB.

The site of the Medical Sciences Building has been used by the University of Toronto in science and medical education since as early as 1850. Part of a substantial expansion of the university post-World War II, several older buildings including the School of Practical Science built in 1878 (also known as "The Little Red Skulehouse"), were demolished in 1966 to accommodate its construction. It was completed in 1969. The large building allowed the Faculty of Medicine to greatly expand its research capacity with new laboratory spaces.

During the 2010s the MSB underwent a C$40 million renovation to modernize its facilities as part of a C$190 million Lab Innovation for Toronto project.

In 2025, Toronto City Council adopted a by-law to designate the Medical Sciences Building under the Ontario Heritage Act.

The west wing of the Medical Sciences Building is slated to be demolished and replaced by the planned Temerty Building, designed by architect firms MVRDV and Diamond Schmitt. The 11-storey Temerty Building will be funded by a $100 million donation from James and Louise Temerty made in 2020, part of a $250 million gift to the University of Toronto's Faculty of Medicine.

== See also ==
- List of University of Toronto buildings
