= Gillian Hawker =

Canadian clinician-scientist (born 1959)

- Born: 1959 (age 66–67); Toronto, Ontario, Canada

Academic background
- Education: MD, 1984, MSc, 1992, University of Toronto
- Thesis: The reliability and validity of using patient survey and hospital discharge files to assess peri-operative health status and outcomes in knee replacement surgery. (1993)

Gillian Alexandra Hawker FCAHS (born 1959) is a Canadian clinician-scientist. She is a Professor of Medicine at the University of Toronto and Sir John and Lady Eaton Professor and Chair of Medicine at Women's College Hospital. Hawker's research focuses on causes and treatments for osteoarthritis.

== Early life and education ==
Hawker was born in 1959. Growing up in Toronto, Ontario, Hawker attended Havergal College, an independent day and boarding school for girls. Upon graduating, she enrolled at the University of Toronto (U of T) for her medical degree and Master of Science degree in clinical epidemiology and health care research. While completing her education, residency, and fellowship, Hawker gave birth to three children.

== Career ==
Upon completing her residency and fellowship, Hawker joined U of T's Faculty of Medicine in 1993 as a clinician-scientist at Women's College Hospital (WCH). She eventually became the director of WCH's osteoporosis research program, where she focused on osteoporosis (OA). One of her studies into OA included developing alternatives to hormone replacement for bone loss during menopause. She also helped establish one of the first doctoral programs in clinical epidemiology in North America. In 2003, Hawker was awarded the F.M. Hill Chair in Academic Women's Medicine by WCH and was appointed their chief of medicine two years later. In this role, Hawker received a five-year Senior Distinguished Research Investigator Award from the Arthritis Society of Canada. As a result of her research and academic accomplishments, Hawker was the recipient of the Robert Hyland Award for Excellence in Mentorship and Queen Elizabeth II Diamond Jubilee Medal in 2013.

Following these awards, Hawker was appointed chair of the Department of Medicine at the University of Toronto for a five-year term starting in July 2014. While serving in this role, she was elected as a fellow of the Canadian Academy of Health Sciences for her work on improving access to care and outcomes for people with osteoarthritis. Two years later, Hawker was the recipient of the 2017 Canadian Medical Association May Cohen Award for Women Mentors.

During the COVID-19 pandemic, Hawker was awarded a Clinical Research Award from the Osteoarthritis Research Society International.
