= Ernesto Pompeo Molmenti =

American transplant surgeon, scientist, and author

- Education: Boston University Washington University in St. Louis University of Pittsburgh Johns Hopkins University
- Occupation: Transplant Surgeon
- Organization: Northwell Health
- Known for: Syndromic Incidence of Ovarian Cancer & Vascular procedures during transplant
- Spouse: Christine Sardo Molmenti (m. 2013)

Ernesto Pompeo Molmenti is an American transplant surgeon, scientist, and author. Currently practicing in Reno, Nevada. He is Chief of Transplantation at Renown Health, Executive Director of the Renown Transplant Institute, Director and Executive Vice President of the Nevada Transplant Institute, and Professor at the University of Nevada, Reno.

Previously, Molmenti served as Chief of Surgical Innovation and Vice-Chairman of the Department of Surgery at North Shore University Hospital / Northwell Health, and as a Professor of Surgery, Medicine, and Pediatrics at Zucker School of Medicine at Hofstra/Northwell.

Molmenti is recognized for his description of the “Syndromic Incidence of Ovarian Cancer after Liver Transplantation, with Special Reference to Anteceding Breast Cancer,” and for the development of the vascular reconstruction technique known as the "Molmenti technique".

== Biography ==
Ernesto Pompeo Molmenti was born in Buenos Aires, Argentina. He is the son of a surgeon father and an artist mother. When he was interviewed during his Chief residency, he stated that "From my father, I gained a love of anatomy and surgery, from my mother, a love of books". He received a full scholarship during high school, that allowed him to continue his education in the United States.

== Education ==
Molmenti completed the early admission combined college and medical school program (MMEDIC) at Boston University with the degrees of BA and MD. His residency training and Chief Residency was at Barnes-Jewish Hospital - Washington University School of Medicine in St. Louis, and his clinical fellowship in adult and pediatric abdominal organ transplantation at the University of Pittsburgh. His residency included 3 years of basic science research, and his fellowship an extra period of pediatric and pancreatic transplantation. Molmenti has been involved in education, and both clinical and basic research.

== Career ==
After his fellowship, he joined Baylor University Medical Center and Children’s Medical Center in Dallas, Texas. While in Texas, he performed adult kidney and pancreas transplants and both adult and pediatric liver transplants. Molmenti then joined The Johns Hopkins University School of Medicine as Associate Professor of Surgery and Surgical Director Kidney/Pancreas Transplantation. There he also obtained his MBA degree. Prior to joining Hofstra Northwell, he was Professor of Surgery and Director of Abdominal Transplantation at the University of Arizona. In Arizona, he re-established the pediatric kidney transplant program and revitalized the adult kidney transplant program. He also re-established the adult and pediatric liver programs, and the adult pancreas program. He performed the first split liver transplant at the University of Arizona, where a single liver was split into 2 parts, the smaller one being transplanted into a 6 month old girl and the larger one being transplanted into an adult.

== Publications / research ==
Molmenti authored / co-authored over 340 peer-reviewed manuscripts in journals such as the New England Journal of Medicine, The Lancet, Proceedings of the National Academy of Sciences of the United States of America, Journal of Biological Chemistry, Journal of Clinical Investigation, Journal of Experimental Medicine, Journal of Immunology, Annals of Surgery, Journal of the American College of Surgeons, American Journal of Transplantation, Journal of Pediatric Surgery, Journal of Surgical Research, Langenbeck's Archives of Surg, Liver Transplantation, Pediatric Transplantation, Radiology, Surgery, and Transplantation. He also authored 8 books: Atlas of Liver Transplantation (translated into Chinese and Japanese), Intestinal and Multivisceral Transplantation, Kidney and Pancreas Transplantation (translated into Spanish), Thyroidectomy: Anatomical Basis of Surgical Technique (translated into Spanish), and Liver Transplantation (currently in press, McGraw Hill).

Molmenti published as first author his observations and findings on the previously undescribed “Syndromic Incidence of Ovarian Carcinoma After Liver Transplantation, with Special Reference to Anteceding Breast Cancer”. Molmenti has recently proposed (in a publication in The Lancet, 2018) a new approach to directed organ donation and incompatible kidney chains. While at Johns Hopkins, Molmenti was awarded a Faculty Research Fellowship by the American College of Surgeons as well as the Bernard Amos Young Investigator Immunology Award for his work on proteomic characterization of organ transplant rejection. This work was also presented at a special invited lecture to the American Transplant Congress in Boston (2004).
