= Lisa Robinson (scientist) =

Canadian clinician-scientist

Dean of the Temerty Faculty of Medicine
- Incumbent
- Assumed office June 1, 2024
- Preceded by: Patricia Houston (interim)

Personal details
- Education: University of Toronto
- Occupation: Clinician-scientist, professor, pediatric nephrologist

Lisa Robinson is a Canadian clinician-scientist. She is a University of Toronto professor in the Department of Paediatrics and the Dean of the Temerty Faculty of Medicine, former Head of the Division of Nephrology at The Hospital for Sick Children, a Senior Scientist at the SickKids Research Institute, President American Pediatric Society 2022-2023, and the first-ever Chief Diversity officer for the Faculty of Medicine at the University of Toronto.

== Education and training ==
Robinson is originally from Toronto, Canada. She completed her undergraduate and medical education (1991) at the University of Toronto, where she was one of two black medical students in her class.

Robinson completed an internal medicine internship at the Toronto General Hospital (1991-1992), and then a pediatrics residency at the Children's Hospital of Western Ontario (1992-1995). In 1995, she became a fellow of The Royal College of Physicians and Surgeons of Canada. She held a fellowship in pediatric nephrology at Duke University, in North Carolina (1995-1999). She completed research training in the Departments of Immunology and Medicine at Duke University, as a part of the Pediatric Scientist Development Program.

From 1999 to 2002, Robinson was a clinician-scientist at the Duke University Medical Center. She returned to Toronto in 2002, joining the Hospital for Sick Children as a staff nephrologist and a scientist-track investigator in inflammation, immunity, injury and repair.

== Career ==
=== Research ===
Robinson's research interests lies in inflammation, with a focus on the pathways underlying white blood cell migration. As a pediatric nephrologist, her clinical interests lie in kidney transplantation and acute kidney injury. She is a Canada Research Chair for leukocyte migration in inflammation and injury.

=== Science outreach and advocacy for diversity ===
In 2006, Robinson founded the Manulife Kids Science program at the Hospital for Sick Children, which provides interactive science outreach to at-risk middle and high school youth (including patients who receive care at the hospital, and youth in remote and/or disadvantaged neighbourhoods in the Greater Toronto Area). 16,000 children have participated in the program In 2008, she received the Canadian Institutes of Health Research's Synapse Award ($5,000) in recognition of her outreach efforts through the Kids Science Program. In 2014, she founded the Student Advancement Research (StAR) Program, a SickKids summer research program that provides a six-week paid internship (in research and clinical shadowing) for under-represented minority high school students, particularly Black and Indigenous students.

In 2016, Robinson was appointed the first-ever Chief Diversity Officer at the University of Toronto's Faculty of Medicine. In this role, she promotes diversity and inclusion of faculty and staff across the Faculty of Medicine. She is a faculty mentor in the University of Toronto's Diversity Mentorship Program.

== Awards ==
- (2000): Faculty Development Award, American Society of Transplantation (AST), Mount Laurel New Jersey
- (2001): NIH Career Development Award (K08), National Institute of Diabetes and Digestive and Kidney Diseases (NIDDK), Bethesda, Maryland
- (2002): Elected to the Society for Pediatric Research (SPR), The Woodlands, Texas
- (2006): Nominee, Canada's Top 40 Under 40, Toronto, Ontario
- (2010): Black Business and Professional Association (BBPA) Harry Jerome Health Sciences Award, Toronto, Ontario
- (2010): 2010 Canada Foundation for Innovation (CFI) Leader's Opportunity Fund, University of Toronto, Toronto, Ontario
- (2013): Elected to the American Pediatric Society (APS), The Woodlands, Texas
- (2013-2015): Fellow, Pediatric Leadership Development Program (PLDP), Association of Medical School Pediatric Department Chairs (AMSPDC), McLean, Virginia
- (2013–2016): Elected to Council, Society for Pediatric Research (Nephrology), The Woodlands, Texas
- (2013–Present): Member, Editorial Board, American Journal of Physiology - Renal Physiology, Rockville, Maryland
- (2015): President’s Award – Winner in the Empowering People, Commitment to Compassion and Innovating to Drive Impact categories, The Hospital for Sick Children, Toronto, Ontario
- (2015–2017): President, Canadian Association of Paediatric Nephrologists (CAPN)
- (2018): Honouree, 100 Accomplished Black Canadian (ABC) Women, Etobicoke, Ontario
- (2018): Fellow, American Society of Nephrology (FASN), Washington, DC
- (2018–Present): Member, Editorial Board, Journal of the American Society of Nephrology (JASN), Washington, DC

== Selected bibliography ==
- Patel S, Huang YW, Reheman A, Pluthero FG, Chaturvedi S, Tole S, Liu GY, Li L, Durocher Y, Ni H, Kahr WA, Robinson LA. "The Cell Motility Modulator Slit2 is a Potent Inhibitor of Platelet Function." Circulation. 2012.
- Petruzziello TN, Yuen DA, Page AV, Patel S, Soltyk A, Matouk CC, Wong D, Tsui AK, Turgeon PJ, Fish JE, Ho JJD, Steer BM, Khajoee V, Tigdi J, Lee WL, Motto DG, Advani A, Gilbert RE, Karumanchi SA, Robinson LA, Tarr PI, Liles WC, Brunton JL, Marsden PA. "The CXCR4/CXCR7/SDF-1 pathway contributes to the pathogenesis of Shiga toxin-associated hemolytic uremic syndrome in humans and mice." The Journal of Clinical Investigation. 2012: 122(2): pp 759–776.
- Frieling M, Williams A, Al Shareef T, Kala G, Teh JC, Langlois V, Allen U, Hebert D, Robinson LA. "Novel Influenza (H1N1) Infection in Pediatric Renal Transplant Recipients: a Single-Center Experience." Pediatric Transplantation. 2012: 16(2):123-130.
- Quinn K, Henriques M, Tabuchi A, Han B, Yang H, Cheng WE, Tole S, Yu H, Luo A, Charbonney E, Tullis E, Lazarus A, Robinson LA, Ni H, Peterson BR, Kuebler WM, Slutsky AS, Zhang H. "Human neutrophil peptides mediate endothelial-monocyte interaction, foam cell formation, and platelet activation." Arteriosclerosis, Thrombosis, and Vascular Biology. 2011: 31: pp 2070–2079.
- Tole S, Durkan AM, Huang Y-W, Liu GY, Leung A, Jones LL, Taylor JA, Robinson LA. "Thromboxane prostanoid receptor stimulation induces shedding of the transmembrane chemokine, CX3CL1, yet enhances CX3CL1-dependent leukocyte adhesion." American Journal of Physiology. Cell Physiology 2010: 298: pp C1469-80.
- Anthony SJ, Hebert D, Todd L, Korus M, Langlois V, Pool R, Robinson LA, Williams A, Pollock-BarZiv S. "Child and parental perspectives of multidimensional quality of life outcomes after kidney transplantation." Pediatric Transplantation. 2010: 14: pp 249–256.
- Tole S, Mukovozov IM, Huang Y-W, Magalhaes MAO, Yan M, Crow MR, Liu GY, Sun CX, Durocher Y, Glogauer M, Robinson LA. "The axonal repellent, Slit2, inhibits directional migration of circulating neutrophils." Journal of Leukocyte Biology. 2009: 86: pp 1403–15.
- Huang Y-W, Su P, Guang YL, Crow MR, Chaukos D, Yan H, Robinson LA. "Constitutive endocytosis of the chemokine, CX3CL1, prevents its degradation by cell surface metalloproteases." Journal of Biological Chemistry. 2009: 284: pp 29644–653.
- Durkan A, Alexander RT, Liu GY, Rui M, Femia G, Robinson LA. "Expression and targeting of CX3CL1 (Fractalkine) in Renal Tubular Epithelial Cells." Journal of the American Society of Nephrology. 2007: 18: pp 74–83.
