= University of Toronto Faculty of Medicine =

Medical school of the University of Toronto

Coordinates: 43°39′39″N 79°23′37″W

Temerty Faculty of Medicine
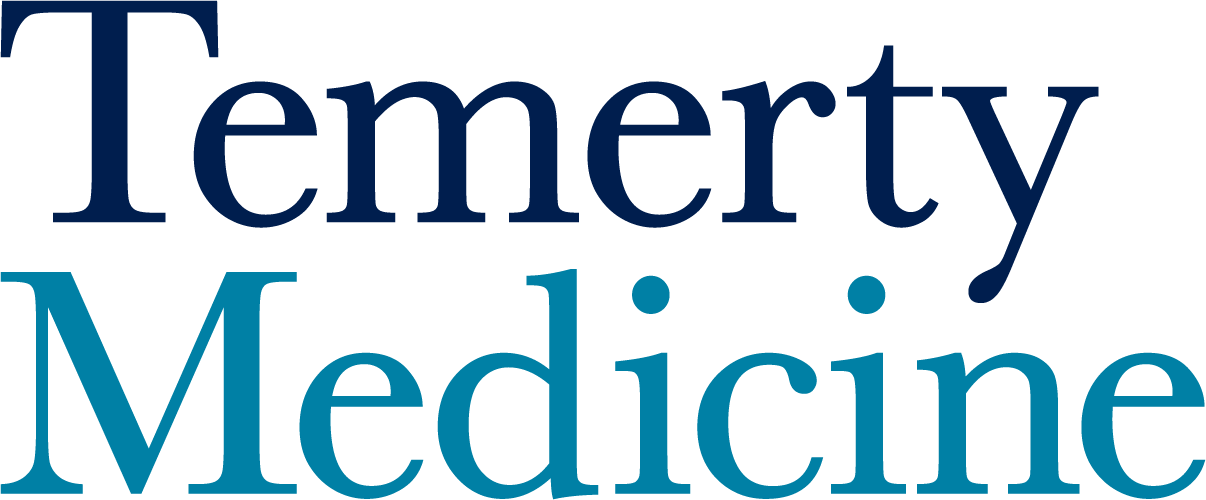
- Former names: Rolph's School of Medicine (1843–1851); Toronto School of Medicine (1851–1887); Faculty of Medicine (1887–2020)
- Type: Public medical school
- Established: 1843; 183 years ago
- Parent institution: University of Toronto
- Dean: Lisa Robinson
- Academic staff: 10,307
- Administrative staff: 917
- Undergraduates: 1,588
- Postgraduates: 3,183
- Other students: 4,029
- Location: Toronto, Ontario, Canada
- Named for: James and Louise Temerty
- Website: temertymedicine.utoronto.ca

The Temerty Faculty of Medicine (TFOM, formerly and still commonly the Faculty of Medicine) is the medical school of the University of Toronto in the Greater Toronto Area of Ontario, Canada. Founded in 1843, Temerty Medicine is the oldest medical school in the province of Ontario and the largest in the country. Its 14 affiliated hospitals and health organizations are collectively known as the Toronto Academic Health Science Network (TAHSN), which includes University Health Network, the largest research hospital network in Canada.

The faculty is based on the University of Toronto's St. George campus near the Discovery District of downtown Toronto, and operates tri-campus on the university's St. George, Mississauga, and Scarborough campuses.

Temerty Medicine is one of two medical schools in the Greater Toronto Area, the other being Toronto Metropolitan University's School of Medicine, established in 2025.

== History ==
=== 1843–1887: predecessors and founding ===
Toronto School of Medicine students in 1882

The University of King's College Medical School, the precursor to the University of Toronto Faculty of Medicine opened in 1843. The University of Toronto itself formed in 1849 following the passage of the Baldwin Act which removed the university from the control of the Anglican Church. In 1853, the United Provinces of Canada legislature, on the ostensible grounds of public sentiment, opposed state aid for the profession of medicine and abolished the medical school at the University of Toronto. As a consequence of the Hincks University Bill, the University of Toronto was reduced to only having a supervisory role in medical education being responsible for administering examinations and conferring degrees.

The decision on the part of the legislature opened the way for private medical schools called proprietary schools to develop in Toronto. In 1850, the Upper Canada School of Medicine formed. In 1851, this school became the medical faculty of the University of Trinity College. Trinity closed in 1856 and was reopened in 1871. John Rolph opened a school in 1843 which was renamed the Toronto School of Medicine in 1851. This would later become the Victoria University of Medicine in 1854. The Victoria School of Medicine would collapse in 1874 and students would go to the new Toronto School of Medicine. This version of the Toronto School of Medicine was re-opened by professors in 1856 without John Rolph and became affiliated with the University of Toronto. The Women's Medical College was founded 1 October 1883. It was affiliated with Trinity Medical College. In 1890, the institution moved and became connected with the University of Toronto with students being able to write exams at either institution. Under the provisions of the bill of 1853, the University of Toronto was responsible for licensing the medical graduates of these colleges. The University of Toronto would administer examinations and confer a Bachelor of Medicine degree to those who proved competent.

The two main proprietary schools that educated future physicians were the Toronto School of Medicine and the Trinity School of Medicine. Both schools were successful and were able to expand their facilities and attract more students. However, a point of criticism from detractors was that these schools were not able to provide a proper education in the sciences. Science was at the forefront of the change in universities' pedagogic shift to centres of research and knowledge dissemination. Laboratories and experiments were integral to this shift, and the expense associated with providing for these in a medical education was not something that the proprietary schools could bear. In 1868, the government of Ontario cut off grants to medical schools. Reliant solely on tuition fees, the schools could not provide the necessary resources needed for the increasing focus on science. In 1878, the University of Toronto Senate set more demanding standards for their examinations, which led to a decline in students seeking their degrees at the university. In 1883, only ten students passed the exams.

=== 1887–1921: early faculty ===
The University Federation Act of 1887 brought the medical faculty back to life. The Toronto School of Medicine amalgamated with University of Toronto to form the Faculty of Medicine. While initially reticent, the Toronto School of Medicine was not able to offer the same level of scientific education and research abilities as the University of Toronto. Once the Toronto School of Medicine was absorbed, its buildings were used by the University of Toronto, and the Faculty of Medicine was established with 29 members from both institutions. Under William Thomas Aikins, the Dean of the re-founded faculty from 1887 to 1893, rapid changes in education resulted in science being taught and new technologies being used in the education of medical students. In 1889, the University of Toronto built a new biology building with it to also serve in the teaching of medicine. An 1891 expansion led to the top floor being used for the dissection of cadavers. Lectures were given in this building while clinical work was done at the Toronto General Hospital. The Toronto General Hospital also featured laboratory facilities available to the medical students.

Trinity School of Medicine became Trinity Medical College in 1888. While successful, with laboratories and varied teaching facilities, the importance of research and inability for it to compete made its position untenable. In 1902, Trinity began discussions to be absorbed in the University of Toronto Faculty of Medicine. Talks were completed in July 1903 when the charter of the medical college was surrendered to Toronto. At this time, a new medical building was constructed at the University of Toronto called the New Laboratories building that included laboratories with removable partitions to increase and decrease class sizes. When completed in 1904, a celebration was held to mark the occasion and the amalgamation of the University of Toronto and Trinity College.

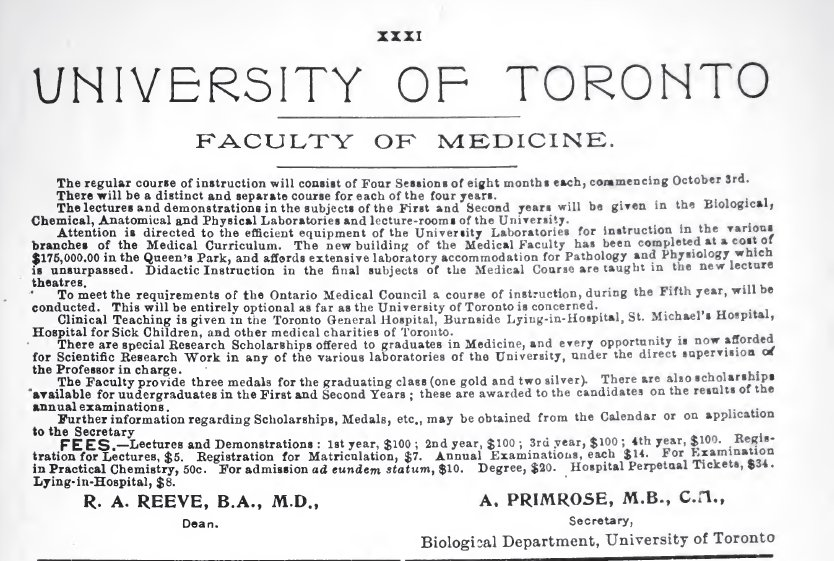
Recruitment ad from 1906, showing course fees, subjects and other information.

The Women's Medical College was not included in the plans and continued as a separate institution. Following the report of the Royal Commission on the University the Women's Medical College was absorbed into the University of Toronto Faculty of Medicine.

The 1910 Flexner Report on the state of medical education in the United States and Canada, which led to the closures of many medical schools across the continent, nonetheless singled out a select few medical schools for praise, among them Toronto's Faculty of Medicine. Flexner praised the "high quality of instruction" offered at Toronto and noted that its equipment was "among the best on the continent". The report suggested that medical schools appoint full-time clinical professors, which led physician William Goldie to establish the Sir John and Lady Eaton Professor and Chair of Medicine in 1919, the first endowed chair at the University of Toronto and the first full-time professorship of medicine in the British Empire. The inaugural holder of the position, which is concurrent with being chair of the Department of Medicine, was Duncan Archibald Graham.

=== 1921–present ===
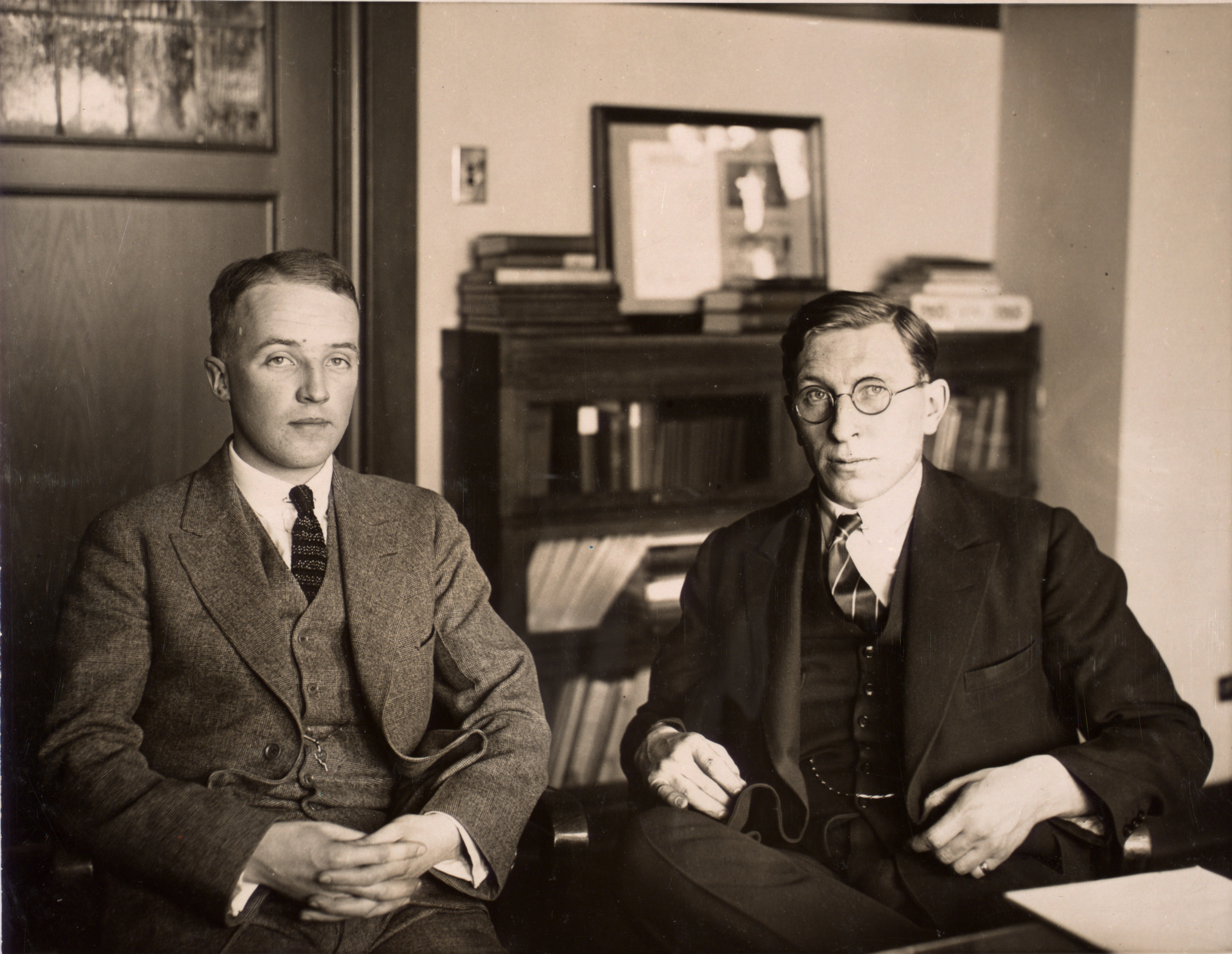
Frederick Banting joined by Charles Best in office, 1924

In 1921, Frederick Banting and Charles Best, working in the laboratory of professor John Macleod at the University of Toronto, were the first to isolate insulin from a dog pancreas. In 1922 at Toronto General Hospital, the team including biochemist James Collip gave patient Leonard Thompson the first dose of insulin meant to treat diabetes. Banting and Macleod received the Nobel Prize for the discovery of insulin, which they shared with Best and Collip, respectively. They all agreed to assign its patent to the University of Toronto for the token payment of $1.00 to prevent a private third-party from monopolizing the treatment.

The stem cell was first discovered at the university by Ernest McCulloch and James Till in 1963.

Professor David J. Jenkins first introduced the glycemic index in 1981 as a way to compare the relative effects of different foods on postprandial glucose levels.

In 2020, James and Louise Temerty donated $250 million to the faculty, which U of T called the largest donation ever to a Canadian university. The faculty of medicine was named the Temerty Faculty of Medicine (TFOM) in their honour.

In 2021, TFOM publicly apologized in response to a U of T investigation which found antisemitism to be a widespread issue throughout the faculty's history. Before 1960, the faculty maintained a limit on how many Jewish students it accepted. In a paper published that same year, professor Ayelet Kuper said that hateful attitudes about Jews had been on the rise, and criticized the administration for its failing to deal effectively with concerns.

A working group investigating Islamophobia and anti-Arab and Anti-Palestinian racism at the university published a report in 2026 describing a "consistent and recurring pattern of concerns and allegations about the Temerty Faculty of Medicine (TFOM)."

== Affiliated institutions ==
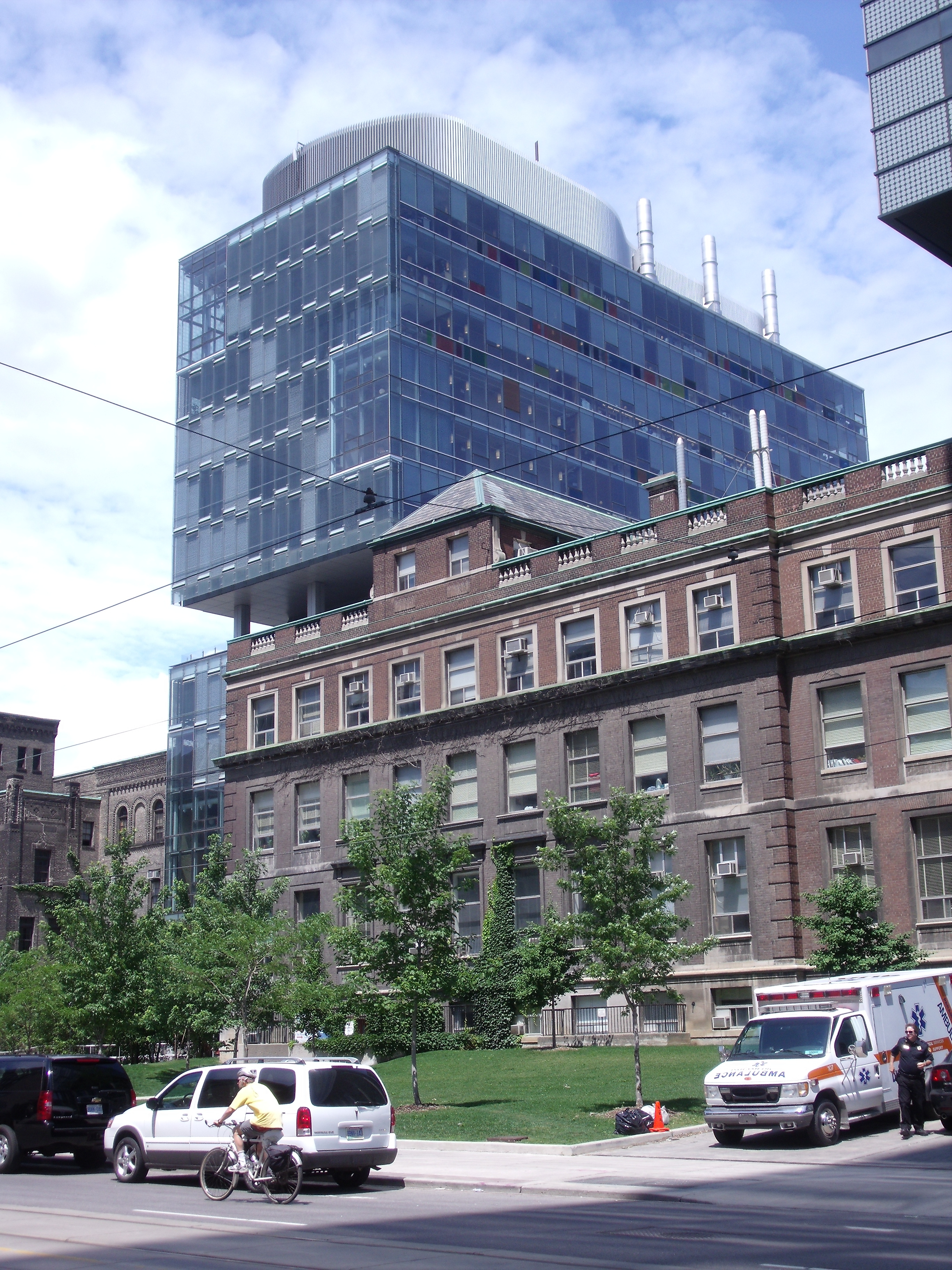
The The Donnelly Centre for Cellular and Biomolecular Research (background) and FitzGerald Building (foreground)

The Temerty Faculty of Medicine is affiliated with several teaching hospitals and research institutes as members of the Toronto Academic Health Science Network (TAHSN), a consortium of health care organizations affiliated with the University of Toronto.

Apart from TAHSN member sites, rotations for students may also involve community teaching hospitals, which include North York General Hospital, St. Joseph's Health Centre, and Markham Stouffville Hospital.

MaRS Discovery District is an affiliated corporation that was established to help commercialize the faculty's life science and medical research through partnerships with private enterprises.

On April 7, 2022, the University of Toronto announced a partnership with American biotechnology company Moderna intended to develop new tools to prevent and treat infectious diseases, collaborating with researchers in the fields of molecular genetics, biomedical engineering, and biochemistry. The collaboration is a joint venture across U of T's Faculties of Applied Science and Engineering and Medicine.

== MD program ==
The Doctor of Medicine (MD) program at the University of Toronto is a 4-year degree with a total enrolment of about 850 students. For the 2026 admission year TFOM will admit 303 students. The first two years are known as the preclerkship curriculum, during which MD candidates acquire basic biomedical and human anatomy knowledge. The principles of medical ethics, professionalism and medical jurisprudence are also taught in preclerkship. The final two years form the clerkship curriculum that takes place in hospitals and ambulatory clinics. The core clerkship rotations cover the essential medical specialties: surgery and internal medicine, psychiatry, pediatrics, obstetrics and gynecology, family medicine, ambulatory experience, neurology, emergency medicine, anesthesia, ophthalmology, otolaryngology and dermatology. Additional rotations are devoted to elective clerkships that provide training in subdisciplines within the major specialities.

=== Academies ===
Each student in the MD program is assigned to one of five academies, a grouping of affiliated teaching hospitals that serve as smaller communities within the large program. The original three academies (FitzGerald, Peters-Boyd, and Wightman-Berris) were established in 1992 and are all located on the St. George campus. Two new academies (Mississauga and Scarborough) were created as the MD program expanded to all three U of T campuses.

==== FitzGerald Academy ====
The FitzGerald Academy (Fitz), established in 1992, is named after John G. FitzGerald and located on the St. George campus. The academy enrols over 700 students annually and comprises Unity Health Toronto, which includes St. Michael’s Hospital as the primary academic anchor hospital, St. Joseph's Health Centre, and Providence Healthcare.

==== Mississauga Academy of Medicine ====
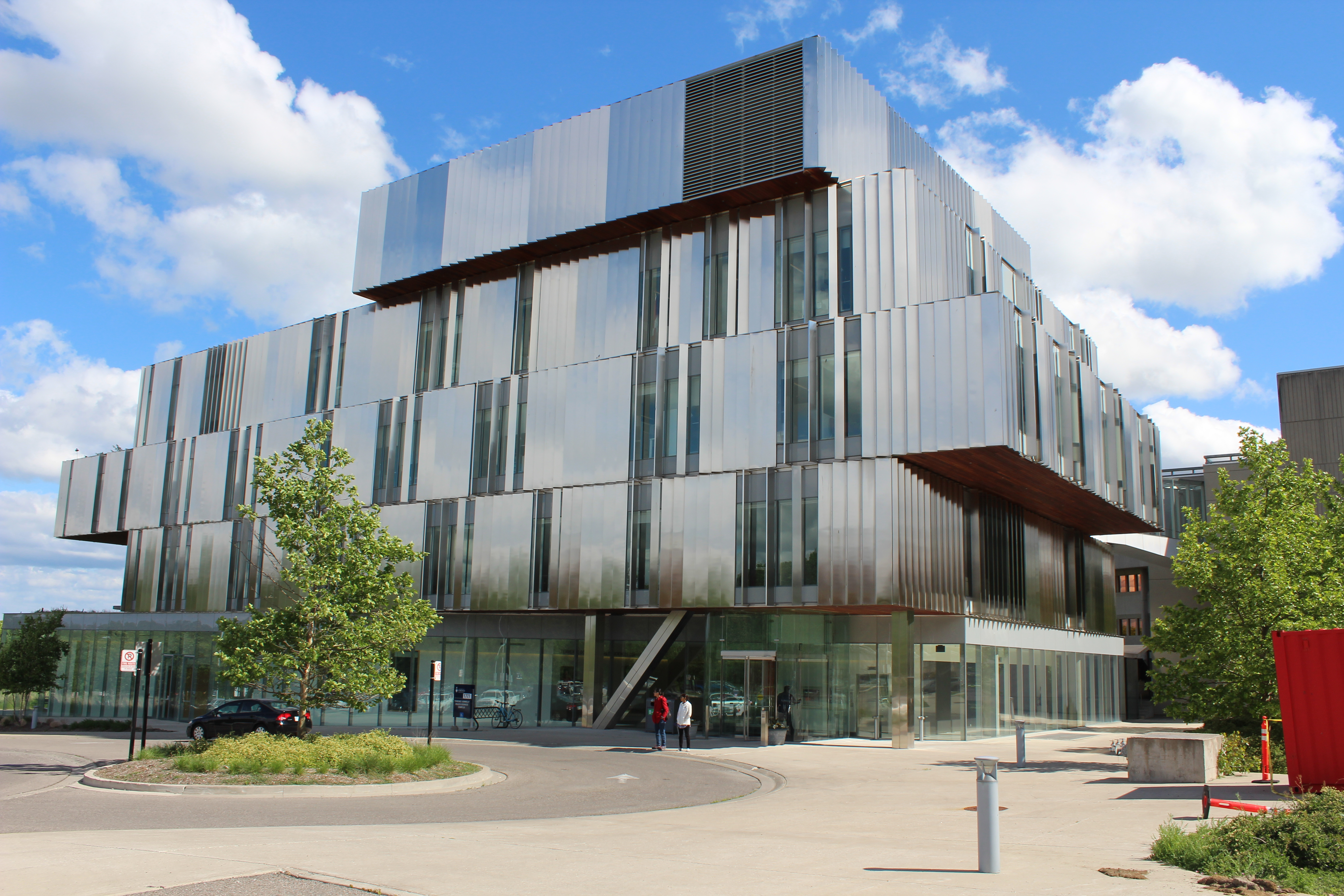
The Terrence Donnelly Health Sciences Complex

The Mississauga Academy of Medicine (MAM), established in 2011 with an inaugural cohort of 54 students, is located on the Mississauga campus. It maintains a clinical partnership with Trillium Health Partners. The academy hosts over 200 students annually, and is based in the Terrence Donnelly Health Sciences Complex, with houses modern classrooms, seminar rooms, computer facilities, learning spaces and laboratories across two floors.

==== Peters-Boyd Academy ====
The Peters-Boyd Academy (PB), established in 1992, is located on the St. George campus and enrols over 400 students annually. It is named after Vera Peters, a pioneer in radiation treatment for cancer, and William Boyd, professor of pathology and prolific author. The academy comprises Sunnybrook Health Sciences Centre, Women's College Hospital, and North York General Hospital.

==== Scarborough Academy of Medicine and Integrated Health ====
The Scarborough Academy of Medicine and Integrated Health (SAMIH) is the newest academy, opened in 2026 for the Lawrence Bloomberg Faculty of Nursing and U of T Scarborough health sciences programs. In 2022, the Ontario government announced that the University of Toronto's Scarborough campus would provide medical training. Starting in 2027, the academy will offer 30 undergraduate seats and 45 postgraduate positions in the Temerty Faculty of Medicine's MD program.

==== Wightman-Berris Academy ====
The Wightman-Berris Academy (WB), established in 1992 and located on the St. George campus, enrols 700 students annually. It is named after Keith J. R. Wightman, Sir John and Lady Eaton Professor and Chair of Medicine and physician-in-chief at Toronto General Hospital throughout the 1960s, and Barnett Berris, the first Jewish doctor to become a full-time faculty member at Toronto General Hospital. It comprises University Health Network (which includes Toronto General Hospital, Toronto Western Hospital, Princess Margaret Cancer Centre, Toronto Rehabilitation Institute, and West Park Healthcare Centre), Sinai Health System (which includes Mount Sinai Hospital and Hennick Bridgepoint Hospital) and Michael Garron Hospital.

== Curriculum ==
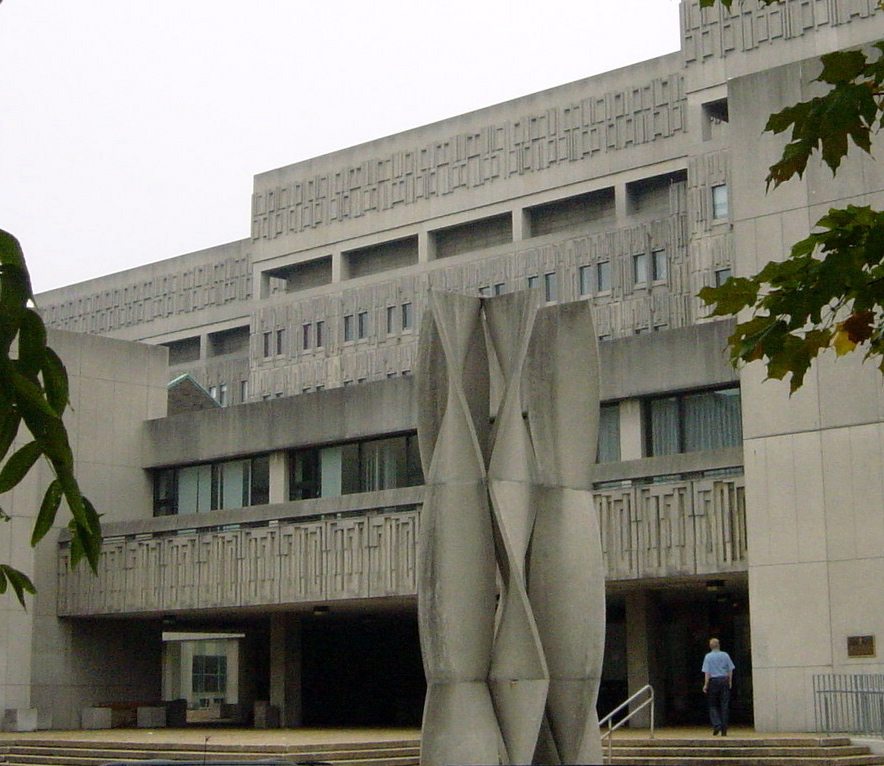
The Medical Sciences Building, the administrative centre of the faculty, opened in 1969

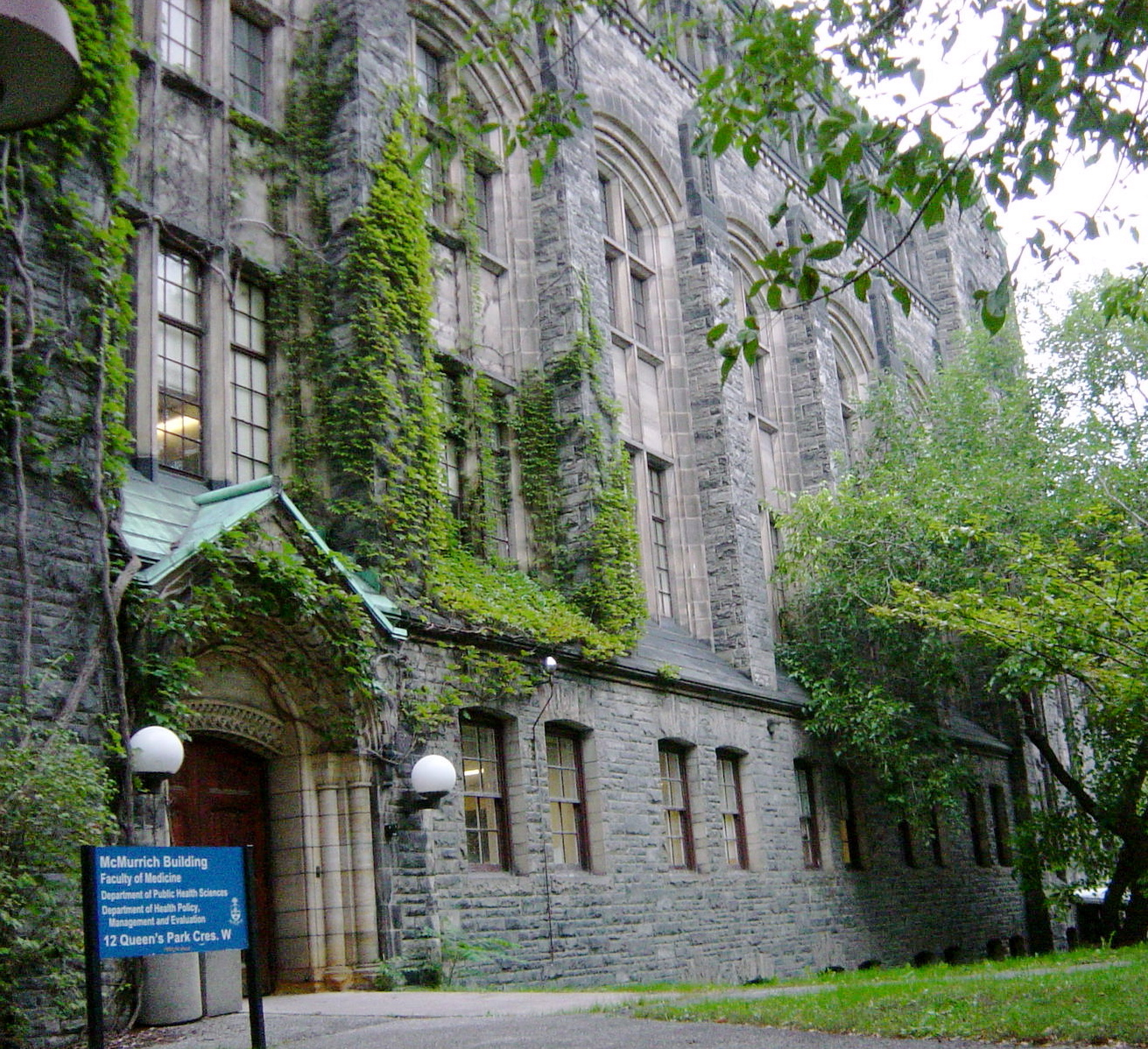
The McMurrich Building contains offices of medical faculty members and researchers.

In 2016, the faculty implemented the new Foundations Curriculum, moving away from the traditional lecture based style of teaching based on anatomy, physiology, pathology and pharmacology and into a case-based learning approach with early clinical exposure.

In 2018, the average accepted undergraduate weighted GPA was 3.96 (on the University of Toronto Weighted GPA (wGPA) Formula) and the median score in the numerically graded sections of the MCAT was 11. In the 2023/2024 admission cycle the average cGPA (cumulative GPA) of accepted students was 3.95. The University of Toronto is one of only a few programs in Canada to accept international students through its admission process. The faculty also offers the MD/PhD degree jointly with University of Toronto doctoral programs, in addition to other degrees of master of science, master of public health, master of health science, doctor of philosophy, and post-doctoral fellowships.

== Academic units ==
The Temerty Faculty of Medicine is subdivided into 26 separate departments and institutes: Anesthesiology and Pain Medicine, Biochemistry, Biomedical Engineering, Donnelly Centre for Cellular and Biomolecular Research, Family and Community Medicine, Immunology, Laboratory Medicine and Pathobiology, Medical Biophysics, Medical Imaging, the Institute of Medical Science, Medicine, Molecular Genetics, Nutritional Sciences, Obstetrics and Gynaecology, Occupational Science and Occupational Therapy, Ophthalmology and Vision Sciences, Otolaryngology Head and Neck Surgery, Paediatrics, Pharmacology and Toxicology, Physical Therapy, Physiology, Psychiatry, Radiation Oncology, Rehabilitation Sciences Institute, Speech-Language Pathology and Surgery.

== Rankings and reputation ==
In 2023 the school was ranked 4th in the world for clinical medicine and surgery by U.S. News & World Report. It was also ranked 9th in the world for medical and health subjects by The Times Higher Education in its 2026 listings.

Historically, it was ranked 13th in the world for medicine by the QS World Ranking. In 2025, the school was ranked 14th in the world Academic Ranking of World Universities for clinical medicine.

While not exclusively regarding the Temerty Faculty of Medicine, in 2023, Nature ranked the University of Toronto 3rd in the world for Health sciences

== Deans ==
The following is a list of deans of the Temerty Faculty of Medicine.

- William Thomas Aikins (1887–1893)
- Uzziel Ogden (1893–1906)
- Richard Andrews Reeve (1896–1908)
- Charles Kirk Clarke (1908–1920)
- Alexander Primrose (1920–1932)
- John G. FitzGerald (1932–1936)
- William Gallie (1936–1946)
- Joseph Arthur MacFarlane (1946–1961)
- John Drennan Hamilton (1961–1966)
- Andrew Lawrence Chute (1966–1976)
- Richard Brian Holmes (1973–1980)
- Frederick Lowy (1980–1987)
- John Dirks (1987–1991)
- G. Harvey Anderson (acting 1992)
- Arnold Aberman (1992–1999)
- David Naylor (1999–2005)
- Catharine Whiteside (2005–2014)
- L. Trevor Young (2015–2023)
- Patricia Houston (interim 2023–2024)
- Lisa Robinson (2024–present)

== Notable people ==
=== Alumni ===
- Jennie Smillie Robertson, class of 1909: First female surgeon in Canada
- Maud Menten, class of 1911: developed the mathematics of enzyme kinetics with Leonor Michaelis
- Theodore Drake, class of 1914: pediatrician and inventor of the baby food Pablum
- Norman Bethune, class of 1916: physician, humanitarian and medical innovator
- Frederick Banting, class of 1916, and Charles Best, class of 1925: Co-discoverers of insulin with professor of physiology John Macleod
- Gladys Boyd, class of 1918: pediatrician, pioneer in treatment of juvenile diabetes
- Victoria Chung, class of 1922: medical missionary and first Canadian of Chinese descent to graduate from medical school in Canada
- Jessie Gray, class of 1934, and professor of clinical surgery: Canada's "First Lady of Surgery", lecturer, and researcher
- Wilfred Gordon Bigelow, class of 1938: Developed the artificial pacemaker and the use of hypothermia in open heart surgery
- Tom Pashby, class of 1940: ophthalmologist and sport safety advocate, Order of Canada, Canada's Sport Hall of Fame
- Gordon Bell, class of 1943: pioneered treatment of alcohol addiction in Canada and invented the alco-dial, a device to estimate blood alcohol levels.
- Henry J. M. Barnett, class of 1944: pioneered use of aspirin as a preventive therapy for heart attack and stroke
- Robert B. Salter, class of 1947: developed the continuous passive motion (CPM) treatment to aid recovery of joints after trauma
- William Thornton Mustard, class of 1947: pediatric cardiac surgeon, developer of the Mustard procedure
- Ernest McCulloch, class of 1948: cellular biologist and Lasker Award recipient credited with the discovery of the stem cell
- Shaf Keshavjee, class of 1985: transplant surgeon and ex-vivo lung transplant pioneer
- C. Miller Fisher, class of 1938: described lacunar strokes and identified transient ischemic attacks as stroke precursors.
- Daniel J. Drucker OC, FRS, class of 1980: University Professor of medicine, research endocrinologist; his discoveries regarding the GLP family of hormones revolutionized treatment of diabetes

=== Past or present faculty ===
- John E. Dick, professor of molecular genetics: Identified the cancer stem cell
- Brenda Andrews, professor at the Donnelly Centre for Cellular and Biomolecular Research and researcher
- Anthony Pawson, professor of molecular and medical genetics, 1985–2013: Researcher in signal transduction
- Tirone E. David, professor of surgery, Developed valve-sparing aortic root replacement
- Lap-Chee Tsui, professor of genetics, 1983–2002: Former vice-chancellor of the University of Hong Kong and president of Human Genome Organisation
- Stephen Scherer, University Professor in the Department of Molecular Genetics. Scherer's discoveries led to the initial description of genome-wide copy number variations (CNVs). He founded Canada's first human genome centre, the Centre for Applied Genomics (TCAG) at the Hospital for Sick Children.
- Tak Wah Mak, professor of medical biophysics, 1975–: Discovered the T-cell receptor
- James Till, professor of medical biophysics, 1958–97: Academic on Internet research ethics
- William Boyd, professor of pathology, 1937–1951, Author of important pathology textbooks
- John C. Boileau Grant, professor of anatomy, 1930–56, Author of notable anatomy textbooks
- Dafna D. Gladman, professor of medicine and Senior Scientist, Krembil Research Institute, noted for research on psoriatic arthritis, systemic lupus erythematosus, and rheumatoid arthritis
- Vivek Rao, cardiac surgeon and medical researcher, Munk Chair in Advanced Cardiac Therapeutics at the Peter Munk Cardiac Centre, Toronto General Hospital, and Senior Scientist in the Division of Experimental Therapeutics at the Toronto General Research Institute
- Toshimasa Takahashi, visiting professor of medicine since November 2024. Noted for Identified novel actions GLP-1 receptor agonists.

== See also ==
- Dalla Lana School of Public Health
- Lawrence Bloomberg Faculty of Nursing
- Leslie Dan Faculty of Pharmacy
- SciNet Consortium
- The Centre for Applied Genomics

== Bibliography ==
- Shorter, Edward (2013). Partnership for Excellence: Medicine at the University of Toronto and Academic Hospitals. Toronto: University of Toronto Press. ISBN 978-1-4426-4595-0.
- McKillop, A.B. (1994). Matters of Mind: The University in Ontario, 1791-1951. Canada: University of Toronto Press. p. 716. ISBN 978-0-8020-7216-0. JSTOR 10.3138/j.ctvcj2q67.
- Harris, Robin (1976). A History of Higher Education in Canada 1663-1960. Canada: University of Toronto Press. p. 740. ISBN 0-8020-3336-9. JSTOR 10.3138/j.ctt1vxmbqp.
- Friedland, M.L. (2002). The University of Toronto: A History. Canada: University of Toronto Press. p. 764. ISBN 0-8020-4429-8.
- Gidney, R.D; Millar, W.P.J (1994). "The Reorientation of Medical Education in Late Nineteenth-Century Ontario: The Proprietary Medical Schools and the Founding of the Faculty of Medicine at the University of Toronto". Journal of the History of Medicine and Allied Sciences. 49 (1): 26. doi:10.1093/jhmas/49.1.52. JSTOR 24623303.
