= Smoky Falls Generating Station =

Smoky Falls
- Location within Ontario
- Country: Canada
- Location: Harmon Township, Ontario
- Coordinates: 50°03′40″N 82°09′41″W
- Purpose: Power
- Status: Operational
- Owners: Ontario Power Generation and Moose Cree First Nation

Dam and spillways
- Impounds: Lower Mattagami River

Smoky Falls Generating Station
- Commission date: 1931
- Hydraulic head: 35 m (115 ft)
- Turbines: 3 x 89.3 MW Kaplan
- Installed capacity: 267.9 MW

Smoky Falls Generating Station is one of four stations in the Lower Mattagami River Hydroelectric Complex owned by Ontario Power Generation (OPG) and the Moose Cree First Nation. The station is approximately 85 km (53 mi) northeast of Kapuskasing in the Cochrane District of Northern Ontario. Smoky Falls was originally commissioned as a 54 MW generating station in 1931 by the Spruce Falls Power and Paper Company but it was sold to OPG's predecessor, Ontario Hydro, in 1991. OPG completed a $2.6 billion upgrade of the four Lower Mattagami dams in 2014 and 2015. The new Smoky Falls was commissioned in late 2014 with a 267.9 MW installed capacity.

== Historic operations ==
A four turbine generating station was originally constructed at Smoky Falls in the 1927-31 period by the Spruce Falls Power and Paper Company to supply power to its nearby newsprint mill in Kapuskasing. Total capacity of the station was 56 MW. The station was built by Morrow and Beatty Ltd. of Peterborough Ontario. The station provided base load power directly to the mill via a 115kV transmission line.

Spruce Falls Power and Paper sold the generating station to Ontario Hydro in 1991.

== Redevelopment and expansion ==
Ontario Hydro built the Harmon, Kipling, and Little Long Generating Stations along the Lower Mattagami in the 1960s. Little Long is upstream of Smoky Falls and Harmon and Kipling are downstream of Smoky Falls. Ontario Hydro planned for the possible expansion of Little Long, Harmon, and Kipling Generating Stations when they were constructed as each station was designed to accommodate additional turbines. However, the upstream water flow was determined by the capacity of Smoky Falls, which was the smallest of the stations. Ontario Hydro's redevelopment plan was based on managing the water flow through all four stations, enabling them to act as peaking plants when required and optimizing the water resource.

Ontario Hydro initially prepared a development plan and submitted an environmental assessment to the Ontario Minister of the Environment in 1990. The proposal involved building a new dam and powerhouse at Smoky Falls, and decommissioning the original generating station. This first development proposal received ministerial approval without a full environmental review in 1994 from the government. However, Ontario Hydro did not proceed with the development at that time due to a surplus of power in the province and it wrote down its investment in the Lower Mattagami stations by $280 million in 1996.

The Lower Mattagami project was revived in 2005 when the government gave Ontario Hydro's successor, OPG, the authority to proceed with planning. Following extensive negotiations with the Moose Cree and subject to the completion of an environmental review, the Minister of Energy issued a directive in 2007 to the Ontario Power Authority to negotiate a power purchase agreement with OPG covering the redeveloped Lower Mattagami stations, including Smoky Falls.

Construction began on the Lower Matagami project in 2010 with Kiewit Alarie Partnership as the general contractor. The new 200 m (660 ft) long gravity dam and powerhouse was built just east of the original generating station, and a new tailrace was completed in what was the former east channel of the river where it is divided by Smoky Falls Island. The first of three new 89.3 MW turbines was commissioned on 30 September 2014, the second in October 2014 and the third in November of the same year.

== Moose Cree participation ==
As part of the redevelopment agreement, OPG negotiated an agreement with the Moose Cree that would the Moose Cree to purchase up to a 25% interest in the four station Lower Mattagami River complex. The agreement was signed in May 2009 and construction began a year later.

== See also ==
- List of power stations in Canada
- List of generating stations in Ontario
