= Arnold Aberman =

Canadian critical care physician

Dean of the University of Toronto Faculty of Medicine
- In office 1992 – 1999
- Preceded by: G. Harvey Anderson (acting)
- Succeeded by: David Naylor

Personal details
- Born: Montreal, Quebec
- Education: McGill University
- Occupation: Professor
- Scientific career
- Organization(s): University of Toronto; Northern Ontario School of Medicine
- Known for: Critical Care Medicine; Medical Administration
- Honours: 2011 Order of Canada

Arnold Aberman is a Canadian physician who is a pioneer in critical care medicine and a medical administrator. He was dean of the University of Toronto Faculty of Medicine from the 1992 to 1999 and held the Sir John and Lady Eaton Professor and Chair of Medicine.

== Early life and education ==
Aberman was born in Montreal, Quebec. He received his BSc in 1965 from McGill University. He is Jewish.

Aberman obtained his medical degree from McGill University with specializations in internal medicine and pulmonary disease.

== Career ==
Dr. Abelman completed residencies at the Royal Victoria Hospital in Montreal and the Albert Einstein College of Medicine in New York City. He trained in California at the Cardiovascular Research Institute of University of California, San Francisco (UCSF) and was a research fellow in the Shock Research Unit of the University of Southern California.

Aberman returned to Canada in 1973 to become director of the Intensive Care Unit at Mt Sinai Hospital in Toronto, Ontario. From 1977 to 1987, he took on additional responsibilities as Physician-in-Chief at Mt Sinai Hospital. He became Professor of Medicine at the University of Toronto in 1980.

In 1987, Aberman was appointed Physician-in-Chief of the Toronto Hospital, an amalgamation of Toronto General and Toronto Western Hospitals. Aberman's major mandate was to merge the two hospital departments clinically, academically, administratively, and financially. His extraordinary administrative abilities were then turned to the restructuring of Toronto's teaching hospitals.

Aberman was appointed Dean of the Faculty of Medicine of the University of Toronto in 1992. He stepped down as dean in 1999.

Starting in 2002, Aberman facilitated the establishment of the Northern Ontario School of Medicine.

He has over 60 publications in critical care. His citation for the Order of Canada in 2011 stated he "contributed to the advancement of medicine for more than 30 years."

As of 2024, Aberman has received four honorary doctorates from different universities, including the University of Toronto. However, in September 2024, he announced he would return his honorary doctorate from U of T in the wake of the manner in which the school handled the 2024 pro-Palestinian protests on university campuses, which he deemed as antisemitic. He believes he is the first person in the school's history to return an honorary degree, ever since the tradition began in 1850.
