= Northland Power =

Power production company

Northland Power Inc.
- Type: Public
- Traded as: TSX: NPI
- Industry: Power generation
- Genre: Independent Power Producer
- Founded: 1987
- Founder: James C. Temerty and Alexander Juchymenko
- Headquarters: Toronto, Ontario, Canada
- Key people: Christine Healy, President and CEO; Jeff Hart, Chief Financial Officer; Rachel Stephenson, Chief People Officer; Jaime Hurtado Cola, Chief Legal Officer; Toby Edmonds, Executive VP, International; Calvin MacCormack, Executive VP, Americas Pierre-Emmanuel Frot, Executive VP, Safety, Projects and Development
- Website: www.northlandpower.com

Northland Power (TSX: NPI) is a Canadian-owned global power producer. Founded in 1987, Northland has a history of developing, owning and operating a diversified mix of energy infrastructure assets including offshore and onshore wind, solar, natural gas and battery energy storage. Northland also supplies energy through a regulated utility.

Headquartered in Toronto, Canada, with global offices in seven countries, Northland owns or has an economic interest in 3.5 GW of gross operating generating capacity and a significant inventory of early to mid-stage development opportunities encompassing approximately 11 GW of potential capacity.

Publicly traded since 1997, Northland's Common Shares, Series 1 and Series 2 Preferred Shares trade on the Toronto Stock Exchange under the symbols NPI, NPI.PR.A and NPI.PR.B, respectively.

== Conversion to corporation ==
In 2009, Northland Power Income Fund acquired and merged with Northland Power Inc. This transaction was motivated by the Government of Canada's elimination of preferential tax treatment for income trusts, which has prompted a mass conversion of Canadian income trusts into regular corporations. On June 21, 2010, Northland's unitholders approved management's plan to convert to a corporation effective January 1, 2011.

== Power projects controlled by Northland ==
=== Operational power projects ===
Name	Location	Fuel Source	Capacity (MW)	Ref
Kirkland Lake	Ontario	Biomass, Natural Gas	132	
North Battleford	Saskatchewan	Natural Gas	260	
Spy Hill	Saskatchewan	Natural Gas	86	
Thorold	Ontario	Natural Gas	265	
Carcelén	Spain	Onshore Wind	49.6	
Chumillas	Spain	Onshore Wind	50	
El Castre	Spain	Onshore Wind	26.7	
Grand Bend	Ontario	Onshore Wind	100	
Jardin d'Éole	Québec	Onshore Wind	134	
La Tella	Spain	Onshore Wind	50	
Lezuza	Spain	Onshore Wind	30	
Loma de Ayala	Spain	Onshore Wind	21	
Los Jarales	Spain	Onshore Wind	16.8	
Los Lomillas	Spain	Onshore Wind	12.6	
McLean's Mountain	Ontario	Onshore Wind	60	
Mont Louis	Quebec	Onshore Wind	100	
Palomarejo	Spain	Onshore Wind	30	
Santa María de Nieva	Spain	Onshore Wind	50	
Sierra Lácera	Spain	Onshore Wind	38.4	
Tres Villas	Spain	Onshore Wind	52.5	
Valbuena	Spain	Onshore Wind	31.7	
Abitibi	Ontario	Solar	10	
Almansa	Spain	Solar	8.8	
Alposol	Spain	Solar	5.2	
Ataquines	Spain	Solar	2	
Belleville North	Ontario	Solar	10	
Belleville South	Ontario	Solar	10	
Burk's Falls East	Ontario	Solar	10	
Burk's Falls West	Ontario	Solar	10	
Casatejada	Spain	Solar	11.4	
Crosby	Ontario	Solar	10	
El Soldado	Spain	Solar	1.2	
Empire	Ontario	Solar	10	
Geinsol	Spain	Solar	9.1	
Glendale	Ontario	Solar	10	
La Rambla	Spain	Solar	5.8	
La Zarza	Spain	Solar	7.5	
Langa	Spain	Solar	2.2	
Lebrija	Spain	Solar	50	
Long Lake	Ontario	Solar	10	
Lora de Estepa	Spain	Solar	2.3	
Martin's Meadows	Ontario	Solar	10	
McCann	Ontario	Solar	10	
Medina del Campo	Spain	Solar	7.1	
North Burgess	Ontario	Solar	10	
Rideau Lakes	Ontario	Solar	10	
Valdecaballeros	Spain	Solar	11.4	
Oneida	Ontario	Battery Energy Storage	250	
Bluestone	United States	Onshore Wind	112	
Ball Hill	United States	Onshore Wind	108	
Deutsche Bucht	Germany	Offshore Wind	252	
Gemini	The Netherlands	Offshore Wind	600	
Nordsee One	Germany	Offshore Wind	332	
EBSA	Colombia	Regulated Utility	480,000+ (Customer Connections)	

=== Projects under advanced development and construction ===
Name	Location	Fuel Source	Capacity (MW)	Ref
Hai Long	Taiwan	Offshore Wind	1,044	
Baltic Power	Poland	Offshore Wind	1,140	
ScotWind	Scotland	Offshore Wind	2,340	
Jurassic BESS	Alberta	Solar and Battery Energy Storage	Battery Energy Storage: 80MW Solar: 220 MW	
Kamionka	Poland	Battery Energy Storage	100 MW / 400 MWh	
Mieczysławów	Poland	Battery Energy Storage	200 MW / 800 MWh	
