= Vivek Rao =

Canadian cardiac surgeon and researcher

Vivek Rao is a Canadian cardiac surgeon and researcher. He was the youngest faculty member ever to join the University of Toronto cardiac surgery division, and, later, the second youngest chief of cardiac surgery ever appointed at the University Health Network Division of Cardiac Surgery.

After attending Upper Canada College, Rao studied medicine at Queen's University at Kingston. He completed his medical and surgical training at the University of Toronto Faculty of Medicine, including PhD training (’94-97), working under Richard D. Weisel in the Surgical Scientist Training Program. He completed a fellowship in cardiac transplantation and mechanical circulatory support at Columbia Presbyterian Hospital.

Rao is the Munk Chair in Advanced Cardiac Therapeutics at the Peter Munk Cardiac Centre, Toronto General Hospital, and Senior Scientist in the Division of Experimental Therapeutics at the Toronto General Research Institute.

Rao is credited with building Canada's largest Advanced Heart Failure Program. In 2001, he was also the first cardiovascular surgeon in Canada to implant HeartMate, a mechanical heart technology he imported into the country based on his training under Dr. Mehmet Oz of the "Dr. Oz Show" in New York.

He is a Fellow of the Royal College of Physicians and Surgeons of Canada.

Rao was named to Canada's Top 40 Under 40.
