= Ray Farquharson =

Canadian doctor, university professor and medical researcher (1897-1965)

Ray Fletcher Farquharson MBE
- Born: 4 August 1897; Claude, Ontario, Canada
- Died: 1 June 1965 (aged 67); Ottawa, Ontario, Canada
- Education: University of Toronto

Ray Fletcher Farquharson MBE (4 August 1897 – 1 June 1965) was a Canadian medical doctor, university professor, and medical researcher. Born in Claude, Ontario, he attended and taught at the University of Toronto for most of his life, and was trained and employed at Toronto General Hospital. With co-researcher Arthur Squires, Farquharson was responsible for the discovery of the Farquharson phenomenon, an important principle of endocrinology, which is that administering external hormones suppresses the natural production of that hormone.

He served in the First and Second World Wars, earning appointment as a Member of the Order of the British Empire for his medical work during the latter. He chaired the Penicillin Committee of Canada and served as a medical consultant for the Royal Canadian Air Force. He was awarded the Queen's Coronation Medal in 1953 for his work for the Defence Review Board. Farquharson was also a charter member of the Royal College of Physicians and Surgeons of Canada.

Farquharson was heavily involved in Canadian medical research and education. As a member of the National Research Council of Canada, his "Farquharson Report" led to the establishment of the Medical Research Council of Canada, of which he was the first president. He received numerous honorary degrees from Canadian universities, and served on the first Board of Governors of York University. He died in 1965, leaving a wife and two daughters. Farquharson was posthumously inducted into the Canadian Medical Hall of Fame in 1998.

== Early life and education ==
Farquharson as a young man

Farquharson was born in Claude, Ontario (a small town northwest of Toronto), on 4 August 1897 to Reverend William Farquharson, a Presbyterian minister, and Annie McDonald Coutts. His brother Charles also became a doctor, while another brother, Robert, became the managing editor for The Globe and Mail and was later an advisor at the Canadian Embassy to the United States. "Farquy", as he was nicknamed by friends, received his early education at Durham and graduated from Harbord Collegiate Institute in Toronto. He briefly attended the University of Toronto's medical school before being drafted into the Canadian Army on 15 May 1918, serving in the Canadian Field Artillery (67th Battery) as a gunner. He did not serve overseas, and was recalled from the military to complete his schooling, graduating in 1922. He underwent post-graduate study in various fields from 1922 until 1927 while serving as an intern and resident at Toronto General Hospital under Duncan Archibald Graham.

Farquharson was awarded research fellowships at Massachusetts General Hospital, where he worked with Joseph Charles Aub and William Salter, and at Harvard University before becoming an assistant professor at the University of Toronto. He published papers on the excretion of calcium in response to excessive acid in the body and "liver therapy" (the consumption of liver) as a treatment for spinal cord degeneration. In 1931 he married Christina Jane Fraser, with whom he had two daughters: Helen, who became a hematologist, and Catherine Jane.

== Career ==
In addition to teaching at the University of Toronto, Farquharson established a private practice as a medical consultant, gaining a reputation as a "doctor's doctor" for his treatment of other physicians. In 1934 he became the head of the therapeutics department at Toronto. He continued to publish research findings on various topics, including anorexia nervosa. Farquharson was a charter member of the Royal College of Physicians and Surgeons of Canada, which oversaw all Canadian postgraduate medical education; he served on its council from 1939 to 1943, and was the council's president from 1945 to 1947. Prior to enlisting in the Second World War, he gave testimony as an expert medical witness in court martial trials.

Ray Fletcher Farquharson during the Second World War

On 25 August 1943, Farquharson enlisted in the Royal Canadian Air Force (RCAF) and was assigned to No. 1 Air Command, based in Trenton, Ontario. He was posted to the United Kingdom in 1944 and briefly returned to No. 1 Air Command before being released from service on 22 November 1945 with the rank of wing commander. During the war, he chaired the Penicillin Committee of Canada, which regulated the distribution of penicillin (an antibiotic that largely replaced the sulfonamide used earlier in the war) to the armed forces, and was a consultant to the RCAF's Director of Medical Services. He was also consulted on medical matters by both the other branches of the Canadian armed forces and by various Allied medical groups. He supervised medical experiments involving penicillin therapy conducted in Ontario hospitals in 1943–1944, and was temporarily appointed Director of Medicine at Christie St. Veteran's Hospital in Toronto. After V-E Day, he travelled to Belgium to supervise the administration of penicillin therapy, and later became involved in the care and treatment of war veterans. For his service in the war, Farquharson was appointed a Member of the Order of the British Empire in January 1946. His brother Charles also served in both world wars.

Farquharson was the director of medicine for Toronto veterans' hospitals from 1945 to 1947, and at the same time served as president of the Royal College of Physicians and Surgeons of Canada. In 1947 he was appointed to the Sir John and Lady Eaton Professor of Medicine and Chair at the University of Toronto. From 1947 until his retirement in 1960, he was the Physician-in-Chief of the Toronto General Hospital. His well-known patients included Canadian politician George A. Drew, who he advised to resign as head of the Progressive Conservative Party of Canada and Leader of the Opposition following a near-fatal attack of meningitis; Drew did so, and was succeeded as party leader by John Diefenbaker, who later became Prime Minister of Canada. Farquharson established clinical teaching programs at Women's College Hospital and Sunnybrook Hospital, and expanded those already in place at St. Michael's and Toronto Western. He also appointed the first full-time clinical investigators to the Toronto medical school faculty and increased total faculty numbers from 40 to over 100. He became a Fellow of the American College of Physicians in 1947 and of the Royal College of Physicians in 1950. He was appointed a member of the Bacteriological Warfare Review Committee, established in 1950 by the Defence Research Board (of which he was a member from 1949 to 1952) and chaired by Dr. Charles Best. For his service to the nation, he was awarded the Queen's Coronation Medal in 1953.

Through his research in endocrinology with colleague Arthur Squires, Farquharson discovered what became known as the "Farquharson Phenomenon": that the introduction of continuous exogenous hormone doses suppresses the natural production of that hormone in the patient and causes temporary atrophy in the producing organ. This phenomenon became one of the basic principles of endocrinology and a key factor in the etiology of hormonal abnormalities. Farquharson also made significant contributions related to anemia and pigment metabolism. He was the first Canadian doctor to publicize Sheehan's syndrome, and the first North American to report on Simmond's disease. As an educator and researcher, he was an early promoter of laboratory testing in the evaluation of illness; he was known for advocating both this and awareness of potential psychological issues in patients.

Farquharson became a member of the National Research Council of Canada in 1951, and in 1957 was named the director of the Division of Medical Research. In 1958, he chaired a Privy Council Committee tasked with producing a report on the state of medical research in Canada; this charge was in response to a 1957 report by the Association of Canadian Medical Colleges to the Prime Minister, which suggested that medical research in Canada was underfunded. While researching his report, he visited the Soviet Union in 1959 as part of a contingent representing the Research Council; he remarked on the country's apparent emphasis on scientific research, and invited Soviet scientists to visit Canada. Farquharson concluded that existing government support for research in Canada failed to specifically address medical research as an independent discipline and was financially insufficient. His "Farquharson Report" led to the formation of the Medical Research Council of Canada in 1960, over which he presided until his death. As president, Farquharson advocated for progressive medical education taught by practising physicians and for continuing education via research for doctors. He was also able to increase the organization's budget for awards and grants from Can$4 million in 1963 to $9 million by 1965.

Farquharson became the Regent of the American College of Physicians in 1958 after having spent three years as the organization's Ontario representative. He joined the first Board of Governors of York University in 1959, and was a member of the University of Toronto Senate in the same year. He was named a Fellow of the Royal Society of Canada in 1960. He was also a member of a number of medical organizations in both Canada and the US, and chairman or board member for some 20 medical research groups.

== Retirement and legacy ==
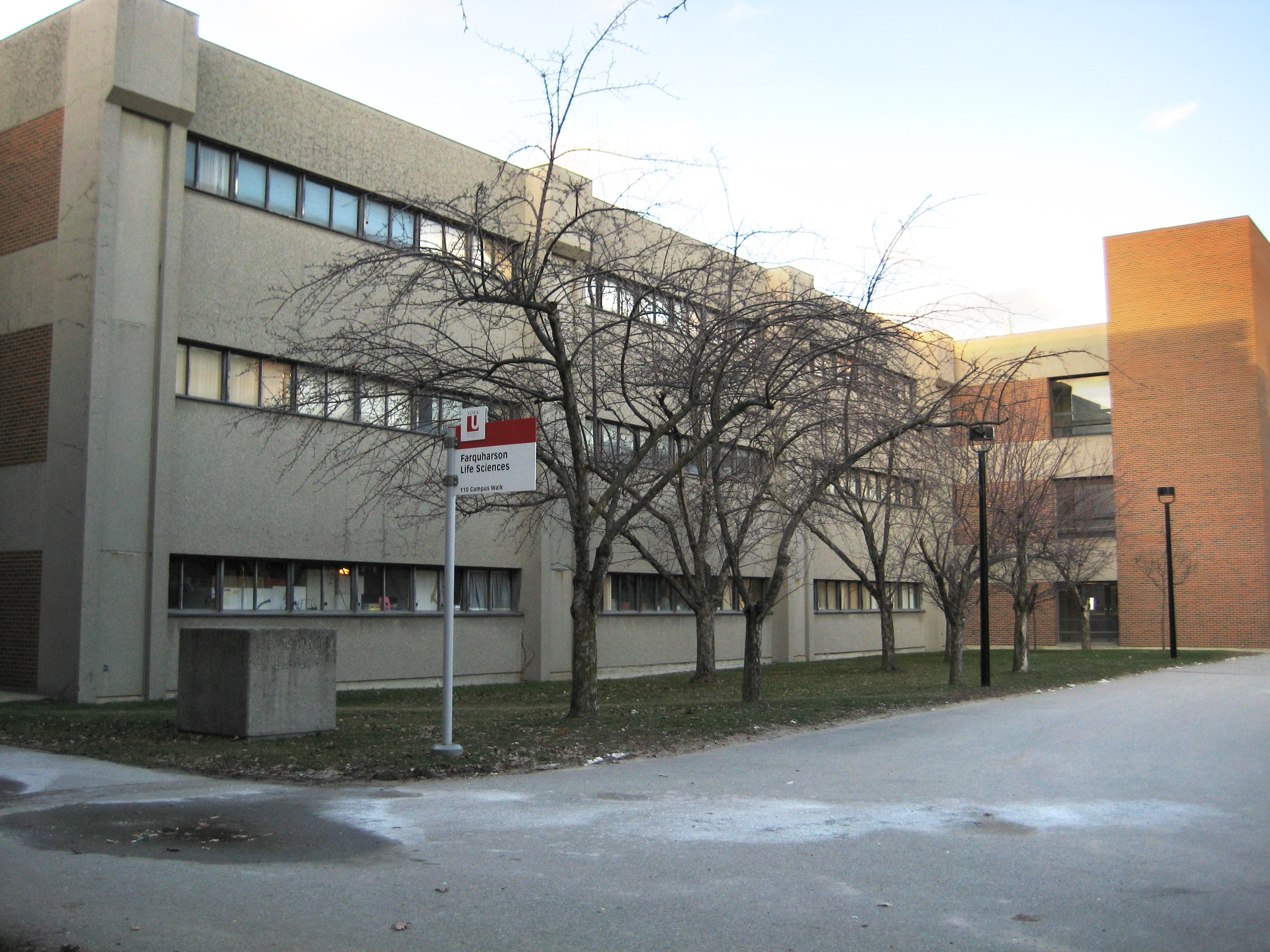
Farquharson Life Sciences Building, York University, Toronto

In 1960, having reached the University of Toronto's compulsory retirement age, Farquharson left the university and the hospital. In recognition of his work for Toronto General Hospital, the twelve-bed Clinical Investigation Unit was named after him in 1961, and the Farquharson Foundation was established to support research conducted by the university's teaching hospitals. Also in 1961, Farquharson visited India, later remarking on the societal respect for doctors there. He also continued to advocate for support for universities.

Farquharson won the National Heart Foundation's Award of Merit in 1960, followed by the Pharmaceutical Manufacturers' Association of Canada Health Research Foundation's Medal of Honour in 1964 "for his clinical assessment of antibiotics [and] service as a leading medical educator", becoming one of only 18 people to ever receive this award. He was featured on the cover of Modern Medicine in November 1963. Farquharson was granted honorary degrees by a number of Canadian universities: the University of British Columbia in 1949, the University of Saskatchewan in 1957, Laval University in 1959, Queen's University in 1960, the University of Alberta in 1960, the University of Toronto in 1962, and the University of Montreal in 1965. He was named an honorary member of the Ontario Medical Association. He was also appointed a Knight of the Military and Hospitaller Order of St Lazarus of Jerusalem and an Honorary Fellow of the Royal Society of Medicine in London.

Farquharson died on 1 June 1965 at Ottawa Civic Hospital at age 68 after suffering a heart attack. He had been in Ottawa to attend a meeting of the Medical Research Council. The University of Toronto held a memorial service commemorating his contributions to the school and the medical community.

The Farquharson Life Sciences Building, the first science building at York University, was renamed in honour of Farquharson. A biography of Farquharson was planned, but was never completed. The Ray F. Farquharson Memorial Lecture was established in his memory; the first such lecture was delivered by John Eager Howard of Johns Hopkins University in 1968 on the topic of calcium metabolism. He was posthumously inducted into the Canadian Medical Hall of Fame in 1998 alongside such notable figures as Tommy Douglas, Norman Bethune and Roberta Bondar.

Farquharson was credited by Professor William Goldberg of McMaster University with "attack[ing] racism as part of [his] clinical teaching" because he suggested patient race should only be mentioned if relevant to their diagnosis; he is also credited with combating anti-Semitism. He is considered one of the "Fathers of Canadian Medicine" in both medical research and education. According to one memorial, "no Canadian since Sir William Osler has left as great an imprint upon the practice of Medicine".
