= Sir John and Lady Eaton Professor and Chair of Medicine =

Endowed chair at the University of Toronto

The Sir John and Lady Eaton Professor and Chair of Medicine is a professorship and endowed chair of the Department of Medicine at the University of Toronto. Established in 1919, it was the first endowed chair at the University of Toronto and the first professorship of clinical medicine in the British Empire. The holder of the professorship serves concurrently as chair of the Department of Medicine in the Temerty Faculty of Medicine.

It was established by physician and lecturer William Goldie, following a recommendation of the Flexner Report that medical schools appoint full-time clinical professors. It was endowed through a $500,000 donation from Sir John Eaton and Lady Flora Eaton. Goldie selected bacteriologist Duncan A. Graham as the first to hold the professorship, making Graham the first full-time professor of medicine in the British Empire.

== List of Sir John and Lady Eaton Professors and Chairs ==
- 1919–1947: Duncan A. Graham
- 1947–1960: Ray F. Farquharson
- 1960–1970: Keith J. R. Wightman
- 1970–1981: Charles H. Hollenberg
- 1981–1988: Gerard N. Burrow
- 1989–1992: Arnold Aberman
- 1993–2004: Eliot A. Phillipson
- 2004–2014: Wendy Levinson
- 2014–2024: Gillian Hawker
- 2024–present: Moira Kapral
