= Warden Energy Centre =

Power station in Canada

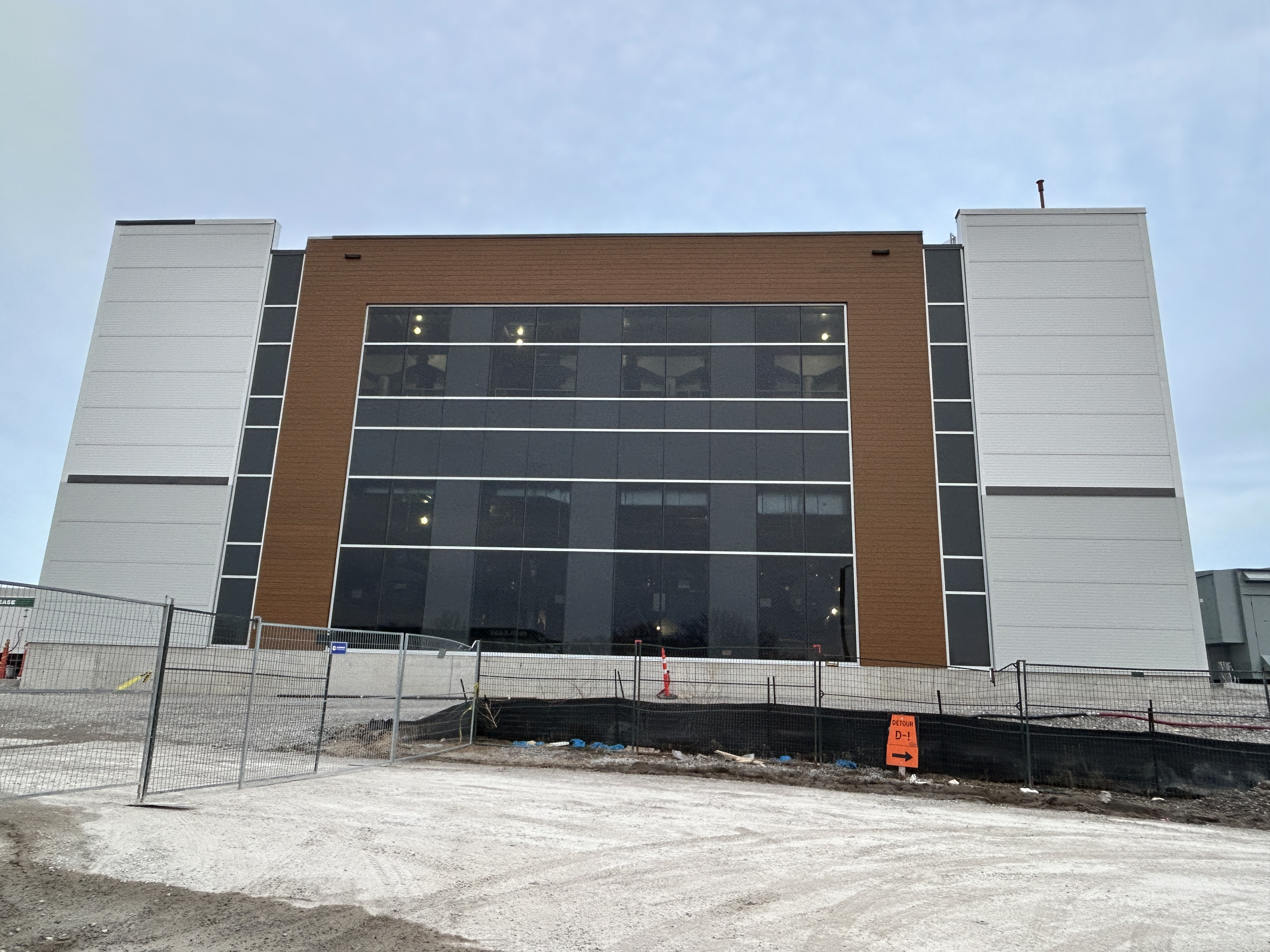
- Location of the Warden Energy Centre in southern Ontario
- Country: Canada
- Location: Markham, Ontario, Ontario
- Coordinates: 43°50′53.4″N 79°19′57.1″W
- Status: Operational
- Commission date: 2000 (additional plant added 2008)
- Owner: Markham District Energy Incorporated

Thermal power station
- Primary fuel: Natural gas (combined heating power plant)

Power generation
- Make and model: Caterpillar (combined heating power plant)
- Nameplate capacity: 8.5 MW and 5.2 MW combined heating power plant (latter added in 2008)

External links
- Commons: Related media on Commons

Warden Energy Centre is a power station owned by Markham District Energy Incorporated situated at the northwest corner of Warden Avenue and Highway 407 in Markham, Ontario, Canada. The 5.2 MW CHP plant uses natural gas to power 2 Caterpillar G3612 natural gas driven reciprocating engine generators.

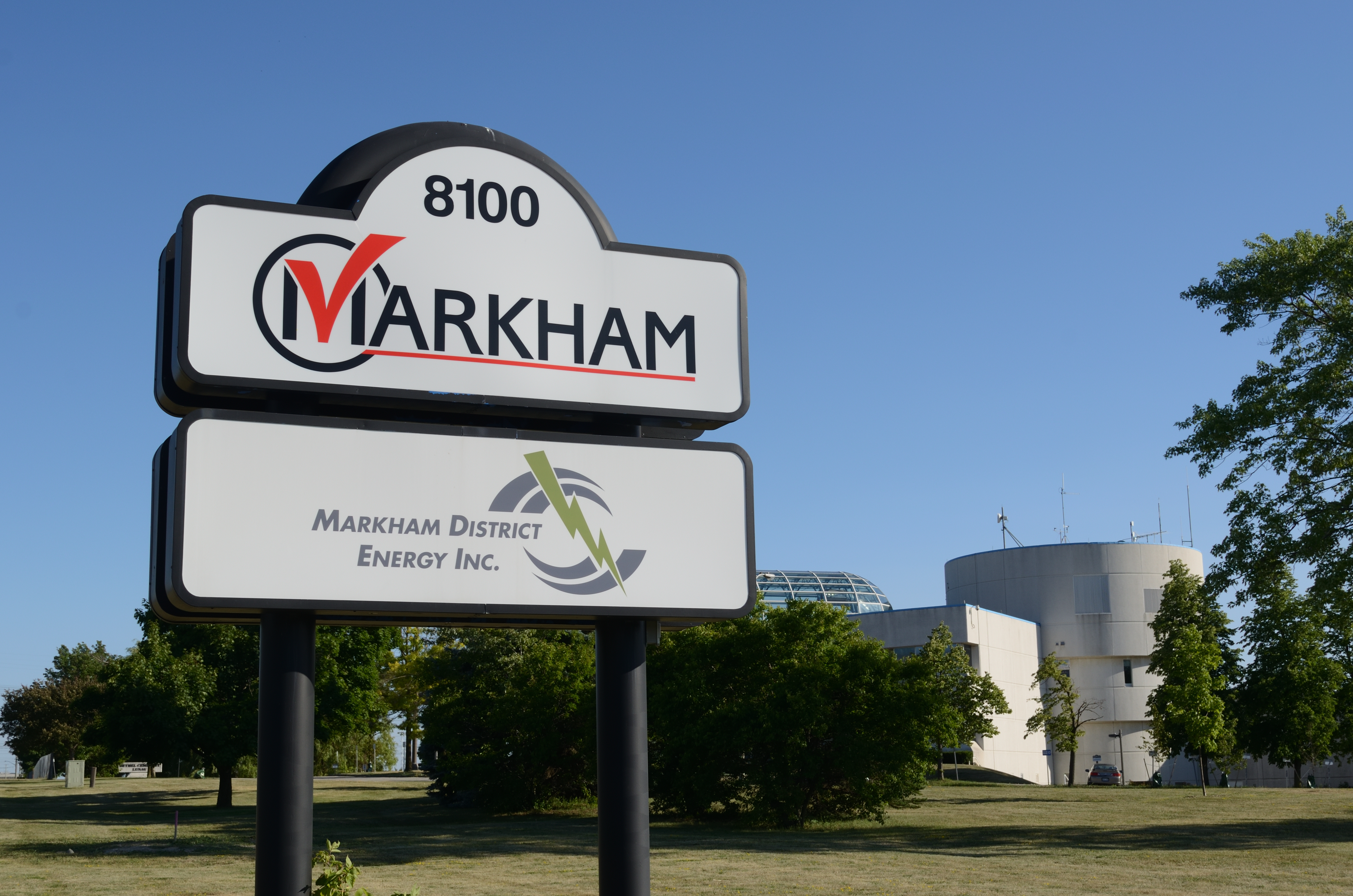
Warden Energy Centre

The combined heating power plant, an 8.5MW CHP, first opened in 2000 with a 12 MW heating capacity and 40MW hot water thermal storage. The additional CHP plant opened in 2008 is a small building attached to the former Markham Hydro head office building (now Administration Centre for Markham Fire & Emergency Services).

The Warden plant is one of three power plants supplying energy for MDE:

- Bur Oak Energy Centre - 3.25 MW CHP opened in 2014
- Birchmount Energy Centre - 2.6 MW CHP with 10 MW heating capacity opened in 2010 at Birchmount Road and Highway 407

== Description ==
The plant consists of:

- two Caterpillar G3612 natural gas driven reciprocating engines
