= Nordsee One offshore wind farm =

Offshore wind farm in Germany

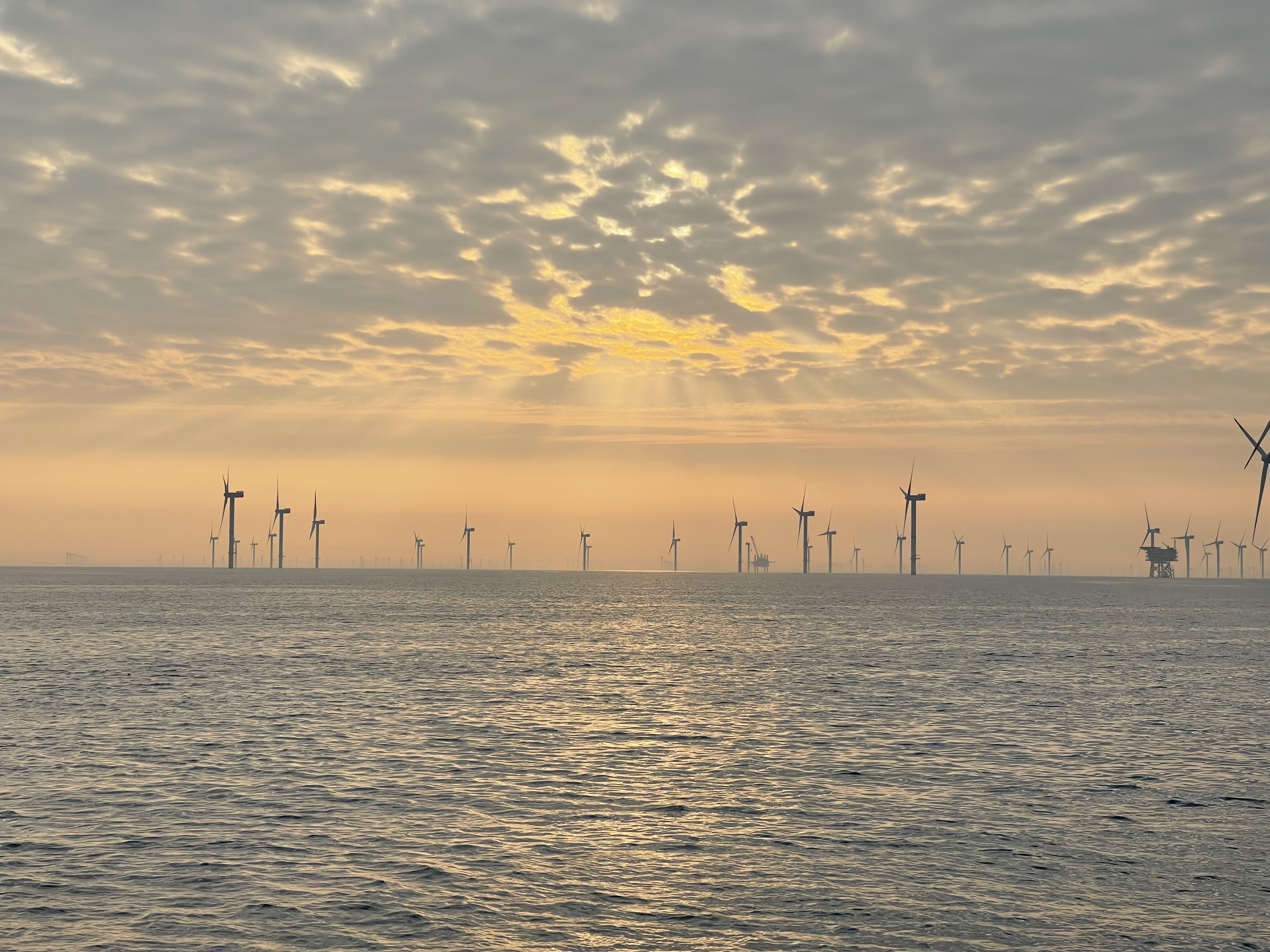
- Country: Germany
- Coordinates: 53°58′44″N 6°48′50″E
- Owners: Innogy; Northland Power; RWE AG

Thermal power station
- Primary fuel: Wind power

Wind farm
- Type: Offshore
- Rotor diameter: 126 m (413 ft)

Power generation
- Units operational: 54 × 6.15 MW
- Make and model: Senvion 6.2M126 (54)
- Nameplate capacity: 332 MW

External links
- Website: www.nordseeone.com/wind-farm/power.html

Wind farm layout

Nordsee One's location in the wind farms of the German Bight

Nordsee One is an offshore wind farm in the German part of the North Sea. It has a nameplate capacity of 332 MW and was commissioned in 2017. It uses 54 Senvion 6.2M126 wind turbines that are expected to produce 1200 GWh of electricity annually. The wind farm is owned by Northland Power (85%) and Innogy (15%). Offshore construction began in December 2015. All 54 turbines were scheduled to have their rotor shaft main bearings replaced during 2021-2022.

The Innogy Nordsee 1 project was originally developed by ENOVA. In 2008, it was acquired by RWE Innogy. The construction permit for Innogy Nordsee 1 was issued on 4 April 2012. In December of 2017 Nordsee 1 began commercial operation.

== Anniversary December 18th ==
In December 2018, it celebrated its first year of full commercial operation. The 332 MW wind farm has been producing green electricity to nearly 400,000 German consumers and has been energetically amortized, recovering the energy consumed for component production and installation in less than a year.
