= Kipling Generating Station =

Kipling Falls Generating Station
- Country: Canada
- Location: Harmon Township, Ontario
- Coordinates: 50°08′41.59″N 82°12′31.04″W
- Status: Operational
- Commission date: 1966/2014
- Owner: Ontario Power Generation (75%); Moose Cree First Nation (25%)

Thermal power station
- Primary fuel: Hydroelectric

Power generation
- Units operational: 3 x propeller
- Nameplate capacity: 233.3 MW

Kipling Generating Station is one of four stations in the Lower Mattagami River Hydroelectric Complex. The station is jointly owned by Ontario Power Generation (OPG; 75%) and the Moose Cree First Nation (25%). The station is approximately 95 km (59 mi) northeast of Kapuskasing in the Cochrane District of Northern Ontario and is the last of four stations in OPG's Lower Mattagami River complex. Kipling GS was originally commissioned as a 2-unit, 155 MW generating station in 1966 by OPG's predecessor, Ontario Hydro. OPG completed a $2.6 billion construction project covering the four Lower Mattagami dams in 2014 and 2015, and added a third generating unit with 78.3 MW capacity to Kipling GS, bringing the total station capacity to 233.3 MW.

== See also ==
- List of power stations in Canada
- List of generating stations in Ontario
