= Toshimasa Takahashi =

Japanese physician and medical researcher

- 高橋 利匡
- Born: 12 December 1979 (age 46); Kobe, Hyogo Prefecture
- Education: Osaka Medical University; Kobe University
- Known for: Identified novel actions GLP-1 receptor agonists Sulfonylureas in diabetes treatment
- Awards: Young Investigator Award (YIA), Japan Geriatrics Society (2023)
- Scientific career
- Fields: Geriatric medicine Diabetes; Gastroenterology
- Workplaces: University of Toronto Faculty of Medicine
- Doctoral advisor: Susumu Seino; Bell
- Website: https://toshimasa-lab.com/

Toshimasa Takahashi (Japanese: 高橋 利匡, born December 15, 1979) is a Japanese physician and medical researcher. He serves as a visiting faculty member at the Graduate School of Medicine, Osaka University, and is working as Visiting Professor at the University of Toronto Faculty of Medicine since November 2024. His areas of expertise include geriatric medicine, diabetes, and gastroenterology, with a particular focus on autophagy (the cellular self-cleaning mechanism).

== Biography ==
Takahashi was born in Kobe, Hyōgo Prefecture, and spent part of his early childhood in Miami, United States. He was inspired to pursue a medical career after witnessing the impact of the Great Hanshin-Awaji Earthquake. After graduating from Hyogo Prefectural Nagata High School, he earned his M.D. from Osaka Medical University (now Osaka Medical and Pharmaceutical University) in March 2006. He began clinical practice at Takatsuki General Hospital the same year.

In 2009, he completed a Ph.D. in internal medicine at Kobe University Graduate School of Medicine. Under the supervision of Professor Susumu Seino and Professor Bell from the University of Chicago, known for significant work on human insulin gene mechanisms. He identified novel actions of GLP-1 receptor agonists and sulfonylureas in diabetes treatment.

In 2014, he joined Kita-Harima Medical Center, where he worked in endocrinology, geriatrics and gastroenterology. In 2018, he moved to the U.S. and became a postdoctoral researcher at Cincinnati Children’s Hospital. In 2021, he began working as a research associate at the University of Toronto Faculty of Medicine. The following year, he was appointed lecturer in geriatrics and general internal medicine at Osaka University.

Since 2023, he has also been affiliated with Takahashi Clinic while continuing as visiting faculty at Osaka University. In November 2024, he assumed the role of Visiting Professor at the University of Toronto Faculty of Medicine.

== Specialization ==
Clinical Practice

- Geriatric medicine
- Diabetes
- Gastroenterology

Research

- Autophagy in age-related metabolic disorders and diabetes
- Aging-related inflammation and malignancies

== Publications ==
Sole Author

- 高橋, 利匡 (15 February 2016). "糖尿病診療トレーニング問題集（専門医レベル）" [Specialist-Level Training Workbook for Diabetes Care]. 尿病診療マスター (Diabetes Master Series) (Magazine) (in Japanese). 14 (2). Tokyo: Igaku-Shoin.

Co-authored

- 高橋, 利匡 (2015). 寺内康夫 (ed.). いま知っておきたい経口糖尿病治療薬の疑問76 [76 Key Questions on Oral Diabetes Medications You Should Know Today] (in Japanese). Tokyo: Nankodo (published October 2015). ISBN 978-4-524-25789-8.
- Annual Review糖尿病，代謝，内分泌2015 [Annual Review: Diabetes, Metabolism, and Endocrinology 2015] (in Japanese). Tokyo: Chugai-Igakusha. January 2015. ISBN 978-4-498-12353-3.

== Awards ==
- 2025 – Research Encouragement Award, Japanese Society of Anti-Aging Medicine
- 2023 – Research Grant for Aging and Geriatrics
- 2023 – Young Investigator Award (YIA), Japan Geriatrics Society
- 2022 – Research Grant, Mochida Memorial Medical and Pharmaceutical Foundation
- 2020 – Travel Grant, American Pancreatic Association Annual Conference
- 2017 – Overseas Research Fellowship, Japan Heart Foundation

== International Conference Presentations ==
- 2019 – 50th Annual Meeting, American Pancreatic Association (USA)
- 2016 – Master Class on Ageing in Asia, International Association of Gerontology and Geriatrics (China)
- 2016 – 52nd Annual Meeting, European Association for the Study of Diabetes (Germany)
- 2013 – 73rd Scientific Sessions, American Diabetes Association (USA)
- 2013 – Beta Cell Workshop (Japan)
