= Dafna D. Gladman =

Canadian doctor and medical researcher

Dafna D. Gladman OC FRCPC
- Scientific career
- Fields: Psoriatic arthritis, systemic lupus erythematosus (SLE), rheumatoid arthritis
- Institutions: Krembil Research Institute (Krembil), University of Toronto

Dafna Debora Gladman OC FRCPC is a Canadian doctor and medical researcher working in the fields of psoriatic arthritis, systemic lupus erythematosus, and rheumatoid arthritis. She is a professor at the University of Toronto Faculty of Medicine and Senior Scientist at the Krembil Research Institute. She is Deputy Director, Centre for Prognosis Studies in the Rheumatic Diseases (part of the University Health Network Arthritis and Autoimmunity Research Centre), Co-Director, Lupus Clinic, Toronto Western Hospital (TWH) and Director, Psoriatic Arthritis Program, Toronto Western Hospital.

== Education ==
Gladman received her M.D. from the University of Toronto in 1971. She completed her post‐graduate training in Rheumatology at the University of Toronto and undertook training in tissue typing with Paul Terasaki at UCLA School of Medicine.

== Career ==
She started an HLA laboratory at the Wellesley Hospital in 1979. She was a staff rheumatologist at Women’s College Hospital from 1978 to 1990 and at the Wellesley Hospital from 1990 to 1995.

She received the 2015 Mentor of the Year Award from the Royal College of Physicians and Surgeons of Canada and the Distinguished Clinical Investigator Award from the American College of Rheumatology in 2018.

She serves on the Medical Board of the National Psoriasis Foundation, which honored her contributions to psoriasis research in 2022.

She was appointed to the Order of Canada in 2024, with the rank of Officer.

== Selected publications ==
- Bombardier, C., Gladman, D. D., Urowitz, M. B., Caron, D., Chang, C. H., Austin, A., Bell, A., Bloch, D. A., Corey, P. N., Decker, J. L., Esdaile, J., Fries, J. F., Ginzler, E. M., Goldsmith, C. H., Hochberg, M. C., Jones, J. V., Riche, N. G., Liang, M. H., Lockshin, M. D., Muenz, L. R., Sackett, D. L. and Schur, P. H. (1992), Derivation of the sledai. A disease activity index for lupus patients. Arthritis & Rheumatism, 35: 630-640. doi:10.1002/art.1780350606
- Taylor, W., Gladman, D., Helliwell, P., Marchesoni, A., Mease, P. and Mielants, H. (2006), Classification criteria for psoriatic arthritis: Development of new criteria from a large international study. Arthritis & Rheumatism, 54: 2665-2673. doi:10.1002/art.21972
- Gladman, D., Ginzler, E., Goldsmith, C., Fortin, P., Liang, M., Sanchez‐Guerrero, J., Urowitz, M., Bacon, P., Bombardieri, S., Hanly, J., Jones, J., Hay, E., Symmons, D., Isenberg, D., Kalunion, K., Maddison, P., Nived, O., Sturfelt, G., Petri, M., Richter, M., Snaith, M. and Zoma, A. (1996), The development and initial validation of the systemic lupus international collaborating clinics/American college of rheumatology damage index for systemic lupus erythematosus. Arthritis & Rheumatism, 39: 363-369. doi:10.1002/art.1780390303
