= Charles Hollenberg =

Canadian physician, educator, and researcher (1930 - 2003)

Charles H. Hollenberg
- Born: September 15, 1930; Winnipeg, Manitoba, Canada
- Died: April 8, 2003 (aged 72)
- Education: Bachelor of Science; Doctor of Medicine
- Alma mater: University of Manitoba
- Occupations: physician, educator, and researcher
- Awards: Order of Canada

Charles H. Hollenberg OC FRSC (September 15, 1930 – April 8, 2003) was a Canadian physician, educator and researcher.

Born in Winnipeg, Manitoba, he received a Bachelor of Science in 1950 and a Doctor of Medicine in 1955 from the University of Manitoba. In 1960, he joined the Department of Medicine at McGill University. From 1970 to 1981, he was the Sir John and Lady Eaton Professor of Medicine and Chair of the Department of Medicine, University of Toronto, and Physician-in-Chief of the Toronto General Hospital.

In 1981, he was appointed Charles H. Best Professor of Medical Research at the University of Toronto, and helped to create the Banting and Best Diabetes Centre, an interdisciplinary centre for diabetes research. In 1983, he was appointed Vice-Provost of Health Sciences of the University of Toronto. In 1991, he became president of the Ontario Cancer Treatment and Research Foundation. He helped found Cancer Care Ontario where he was President and Chief Executive Officer from 1997 to 1999.

In 1983, he was awarded a Mastership of the American College of Physicians (MACP). In 1990, he was made an Officer of the Order of Canada for being "an acknowledged leader in medical education and patient care who has exerted a considerable influence on academic institutions and teaching hospitals through his many professional appointments". In 1999, he was awarded the Gairdner Foundation Wightman Award "in recognition of his outstanding contributions to Canadian medicine and medical science as a leader of the Canadian academic medical community". In 2003, he was inducted into the Canadian Medical Hall of Fame.

He died of prostate cancer.
