= William Boyd (pathologist) =

Canadian pathologist

William Boyd M.D., M.R.C.P., F.R.C.Path.
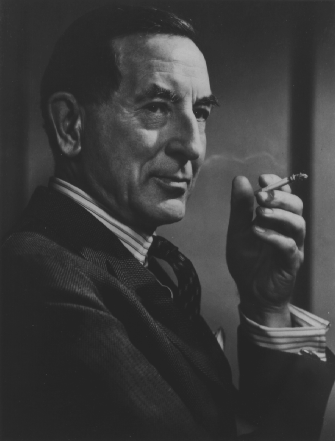
- Photo taken February 16, 1949
- Born: June 21, 1885; Portsoy, Scotland
- Died: March 10, 1979 (aged 93); Toronto, Ontario, Canada
- Citizenship: Canadian
- Education: University of Edinburgh
- Known for: Authorship of major textbooks of pathology
- Spouse: Enid
- Awards: Companion of the Order of Canada
- Scientific career
- Fields: Medicine, Pathology, Neuropsychiatry
- Workplaces: University of Manitoba, University of Toronto, University of British Columbia

William Boyd (June 21, 1885 – March 10, 1979) was a Scottish-Canadian physician, pathologist, academic, and author known for his medical textbooks.

== Biography ==
William was born in Portsoy, Scotland, the sixth child of Dugald Cameron Boyd (a Presbyterian clergyman) and Eliza Marion (née Butcher) Boyd. Educated at the University of Edinburgh, he graduated M.B. Ch.B. in 1908, M.D. in 1911, and went on to become trained and accredited as a neurologist, psychiatrist, and pathologist. Boyd worked as an attending physician and nominal pathologist at the Derby County Asylum in the English Midlands from 1909–1912, and at Winwick Hospital (another neuropsychiatric facility) from 1912–1913. He was a pathologist at Wolverhampton Royal Infirmary from 1913 to August 1914. During World War I, Boyd served as a general medical officer in the Royal Army Medical Corps in Flanders at the rank of captain (O3). In 1916 he wrote the book, With a Field Ambulance at Ypres, describing his experiences as both a physician and an ordinary combatant in the war zone.

After the conflict, Boyd moved to Canada at the urging of friends from medical school who were already working there. He married Enid Christie, the daughter of a Presbyterian minister, in Winnipeg, Manitoba in June 1919. Boyd became a Professor of Pathology in the Manitoba Medical College at the University of Manitoba in Winnipeg and over the next 22 years, he wrote several pathology textbooks that were published and read internationally. These earned him worldwide recognition and financial security. In 1937, he moved to the University of Toronto in Toronto, Ontario and, ultimately, in 1951 to the University of British Columbia in Vancouver, British Columbia. Boyd continued to be an active lecturer on medical-pathological topics, and spoke in many countries.

He was presented with the prestigious gold-headed cane award in 1962 by the American Association of Pathologists and Bacteriologists. In 1968, he was made a Companion of the Order of Canada, Canada's highest civilian honor, "for his services as a pathologist and as a founding member of the National Cancer Institute". Boyd died of pneumonia at the age of 93 in Toronto. He was survived by his wife Enid; the couple had had no children.

== Selected works ==
- Pathology for Surgeons (1925)
- Pathology of Internal Disease (1931)
- Textbook of Pathology (1932)
- Introduction to Medical Science (1937)

== See also ==
- List of pathologists
