= James C. Temerty =

Canadian entrepreneur, business executive and philanthropist

James Constantine Temerty CM
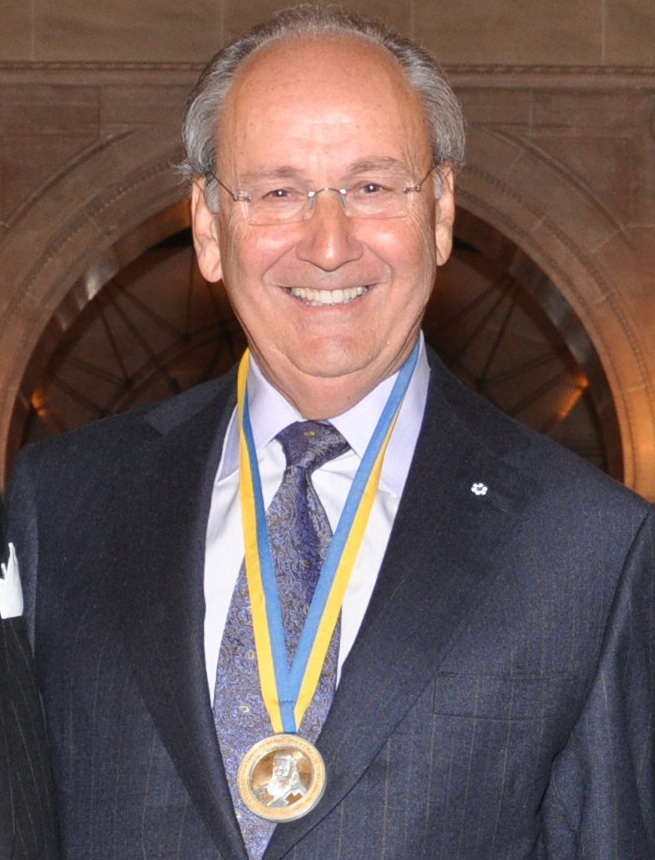
- Born: Constantin Ilkovitch Temerty; December 3, 1941 (age 84); Donbas, Ukraine
- Other name: Jim Temerty
- Occupations: Business executive and philanthropist
- Spouse: Louise Arcand Temerty (m. 1968)
- Children: 2

James Constantine "Jim" Temerty CM (Born December 3, 1941) is a Ukrainian-Canadian entrepreneur, business executive and philanthropist who lives in Toronto, Ontario. He founded Northland Power in 1987 and served as chair until December 2019.

== Professional career ==
In 1987, Temerty founded Northland Power.

== Philanthropy ==
In January 2015, the Temerty Foundation gifted $5 million to the Ukrainian Catholic University (UCU) to construct a new library (the Metropolitan Andrey Sheptytsky Center); this brought the total support of the Temerty Family Foundation to the programs at the UCU to $6.2 million (which includes $1.2 million that the foundation gifted earlier to UCU to establish three departments for the study of Jewish-Ukrainian interfaith relation).

In September 2020, the Temerty Foundation gifted $250 million to the University of Toronto, naming the Temerty Faculty of Medicine and representing the single largest one-time donation in Canadian history at the time of the announcement. In April 2020, $10-million of the gift to Faculty of Medicine's Dean's COVID-19 Priorities Fund, which was advanced and pre-announced to support front-line clinical faculty members and trainees fighting the COVID-19 pandemic.

In December 2022, apparently he donated $1.000.000 to #LightUpUkraine | UNITED 24 raising funds for 1000 generators to power Ukrainian hospitals.

In May 2025, the Royal Ontario Museum announced a $30-million endowment gift from the Temerty Foundation. The Temerty Community Access and Engagement Fund will fund new programs in the museum's galleries and public spaces, providing greater access by reducing barriers to entry.

== Recognition ==
- Appointed a Member of the Order of Canada in recognition of his contributions to society, 2008.
- Ernst & Young Entrepreneur of the Year Award in Canada, 2010.
- The Queen Elizabeth II Diamond Jubilee Medal to honour him for his contributions to his country, 2012.
- Temerty and his wife had a new genus and species of raptor dinosaur named in their honour, the Acheroraptor temertyorum, 2013.
- In 2022, Temerty was inducted into Canada's Walk of Fame and given the National Hero Honour
- Temerty was awarded three honorary doctorates (LL.D.) from York University, Toronto Metropolitan University (formerly Ryerson University), and the University of Western Ontario. The latter two, he shares with his wife.
