= Pediatric Transplantation =

- Discipline: Pediatrics, transplantation
- Language: English
- Edited by: Sharon M Bartosh and Burkhard Tonshoff

Publication details
- History: 1997-present
- Publisher: John Wiley & Sons
- Frequency: Monthly
- Impact factor: 1.502 (2020)

Standard abbreviations
- ISO 4: Pediatr. Transplant.

Indexing
- CODEN: PETRF6
- ISSN: 1397-3142 (print); 1399-3046 (web)
- LCCN: sn98-39091

Links
- Journal homepage; Online access; Online archive

Pediatric Transplantation is a monthly peer-reviewed medical journal covering pediatric transplantation. It is the official journal of the International Pediatric Transplant Association. According to the Journal Citation Reports, the journal has a 2020 impact factor of 1.502.
