= Duncan Archibald Graham =

Canadian physician and academic (1882-1974)

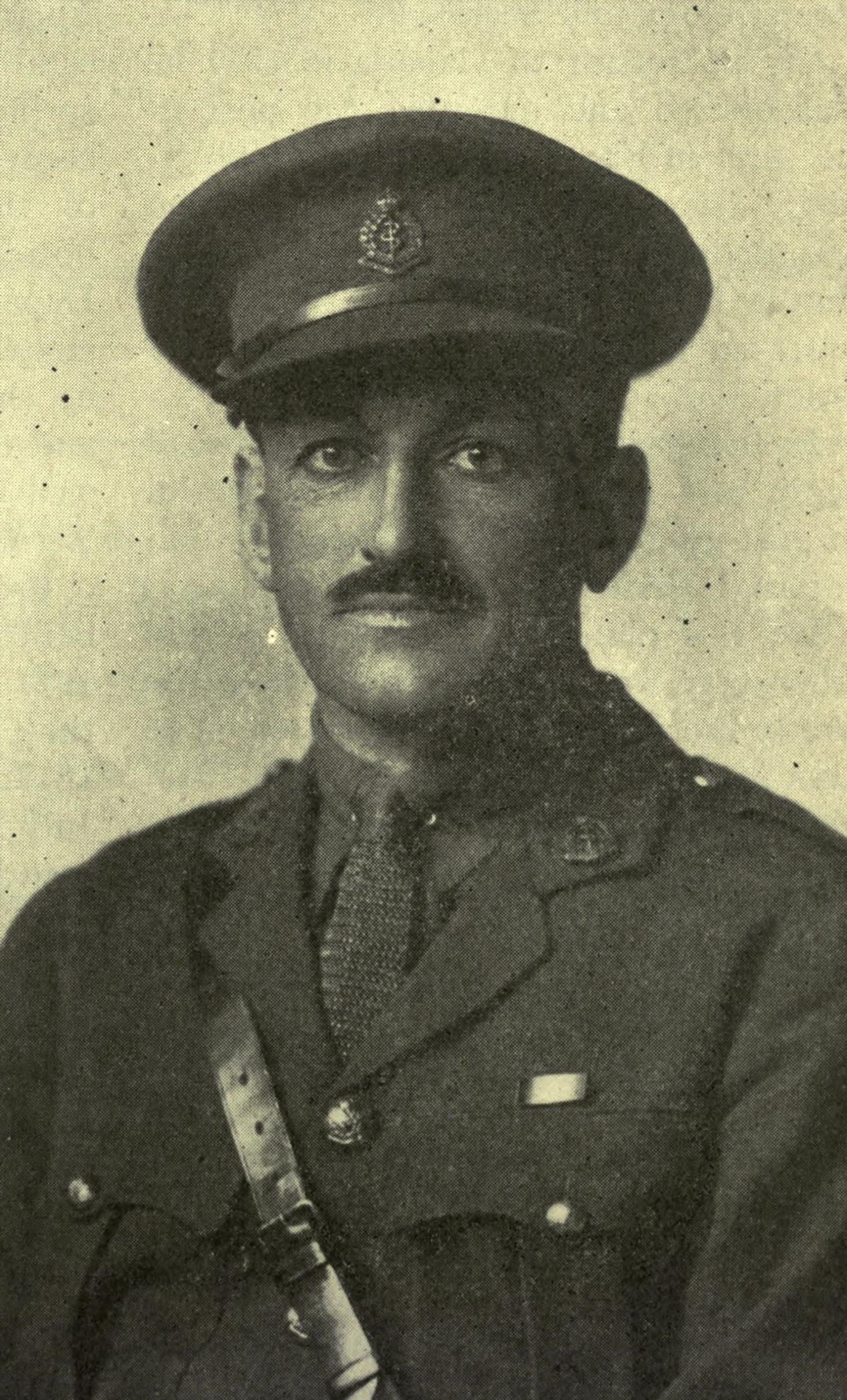
- Born: January 8, 1882; Near Ivan, Ontario, Canada
- Died: February 18, 1974 (aged 92); Toronto, Ontario, Canada
- Education: University of Toronto
- Known for: Physician and professor of medicine
- Title: Sir John and Lady Eaton Professor and Chair of Medicine (1919–1947)
- Awards: Order of Canada, Order of the British Empire
- Scientific career
- Workplaces: University of Toronto; Toronto General Hospital

Duncan Archibald Graham, CC CBE FRSC (January 8, 1882 – February 18, 1974) was a Canadian physician and academic who was the first Sir John and Lady Eaton Professor and Chair of Medicine, the first professorship of clinical medicine in the British Empire, established by John Craig Eaton at the University of Toronto in 1919. He held this position and was chair of the department of medicine and physician-in-chief at the Toronto General Hospital, until 1947.

Born on a farm near Ivan, Ontario, he received a Bachelor of Medicine from the University of Toronto in 1905. He was an assistant bacteriologist with the Ontario Board of Health before starting his residency in pathology at the Toronto General Hospital. He was also a pathologist with the Tuberculosis League of Pittsburg. From 1909 to 1911, he did post-graduate studies in Europe. He was appointed a lecturer in bacteriology at the University of Toronto before serving in World War I with the No. 4 Canadian General Hospital.

In 1919, he was appointed to the Sir John and Lady Eaton Chair in Medicine at the University of Toronto on the recommendation of William Goldie. He was also the physician-in-chief of the Toronto General Hospital. From 1933 to 1935, he was the president of the Royal College of Physicians and Surgeons of Canada. From 1940 to 1941, he was the president of the Canadian Medical Association. From 1942 to 1946, he was a member of the National Research Council.

In 1968, he was made a Companion of the Order of Canada. He was a Commander of the Order of the British Empire. He received honorary degrees from the University of Western Ontario, University of Toronto, and Queen's University.

He died in Toronto in 1974.
