= List of generating stations in Alberta =

This is a list of electrical generating stations in Alberta, Canada.

In 2023 Alberta produced 74% of its electricity through natural gas. Alberta has a deregulated electricity market which allows a large number of private companies to participate in electricity production, particularly in the cases of cogeneration and renewable energy. Alberta's electricity mix is changing towards lower carbon intensity. As of 2013, Alberta's electricity was 52% coal, 38% natural gas and 10% renewable. Ten years later in 2023, this had changed to 74% gas, 8% coal, and 18% renewable. As of June 18, 2024, Capital Power announced that the last coal capable generator was now 100% natural gas-fueled and coal was no longer a source of electricity in Alberta. Alberta has a legislated goal of achieving 30% renewable electricity by 2030.

== Fossil fuel ==
Facilities proposed or under construction
Decommissioned facilities (year)

=== Natural gas ===
List of all natural gas power plants in Alberta including cogeneration
Name	Location	Capacity (MW)	Date	Owner	Type	Ref
Alberta Power Project – Burdett	Burdett	7	2001	Maxim Power	Turbine	
Alberta Power Project – Coaldale	Coaldale	6	2001	Maxim Power	Turbine	
Alberta Power Project – Taber	Taber	8	2001	Maxim Power	Turbine	
Aurora Generating Station	Aurora	85	1999	Syncrude		
Base Plant (SCR1)	Fort McMurray	856	+806 in 2024	Suncor	Cogen	
Balzac Power Station Nexen Inc	Balzac	120	2001	CNOOC		
Battle River Generating Station unit 4	Forestburg	155	2022	Heartland Generation	Steam	
Battle River Generating Station unit 5	Forestburg	385	2021	Heartland Generation	Steam	
Bear Creek Gas Turbine 1	Grande Prairie	64	2002	TransCanada	Cogen	
Bellshill Power Centre	Galahad	5.6	2015	Genalta Power	Turbine	
Cadotte Power Centre	Peace River	20	2012	Genalta Power	Turbine	
Calgary Energy Centre	Calgary	330	2002	Enmax	Combined	
Carseland Power Plant	Carseland	95	2001	TransCanada	Cogen	
Carson Creek Power Centre	Whitecourt	15	2014	Genalta Power	Turbine	
Cascade Generating Station	Yellowhead County	932	2024	Kineticor Resource Corp	Combined	
Cavalier Generating Station	Strathmore	120	2001	Enmax	Combined	
Clover Bar Energy Centre	Edmonton	250	2008	Capital Power	Turbine	
Cold Lake	Cold Lake	168	2002	Imperial Oil		
Crossfield Energy Centre	Rocky View	144	2009	Enmax	Turbine	
Drywood	Drywood	6	2000	TransAlta	Turbine	
Empress Cogeneration Power Facility	Cypress County	45	2022	Pembina Pipeline	Cogen	
Fort Saskatchewan Cogeneration Plant	Fort Saskatchewan	118	1999	Strongwater Energy, TransAlta		
Foster Creek Cogeneration	Bonnyville	98	2003	Cenovus	Cogen	
Genesee Generating Station	Leduc County	1398	1994	Capital Power	1 & 2: Combined 3: Steam	
Harvest Operations Gas Fired Power Plant	Flagstaff County	5.6	202x	Harvest Operations Corp.		
Heartland Petrochemical Complex	Strathcona County	116	2021	Inter Pipeline Ltd.	Cogen	
H. R. Milner Generating Station	Grande Cache	300	2020	Milner Power	Combined	
Joffre Cogeneration Plant	Red Deer	474	2000	Capital Power Corporation, NOVA Chemicals, Heartland Generation	Cogen	
Judy Creek Power Centre	Whitecourt	15	2014	Genalta Power	Turbine	
Kaybob South #3 Cogeneration Plant	Greenview County	40	2022	TransAlta, SemCAMS		
Keephills Generating Station	Duffield	861	1983	TransAlta	Steam	
MacKay River Power Plant	Fort McMurray	207	2003	TransCanada	Cogen	
Mazeppa Gas Plant	Mazeppa	17		MFC Resource Partnership		
Medicine Hat Generating Station	Medicine Hat	299	1910	City of Medicine Hat		
Muskeg River Mine Cogeneration Station	57°18′0″N 111°30′0″W	172	2002	Heartland Generation	Cogen	
Northern Prairie Power Project	Grande Prairie	105	2008	Constellation Energy	Turbine	
Peace River Power Centre	Peace River	20	2015	Genalta Power		
Poplar Creek Cogeneration Plant	Fort McMurray	376	2001	TransAlta	Cogen	
Poplar Hill Generating Plant	Grande Prairie; 55°20′20″N 119°13′07″W	48	1999	Heartland Generation	Turbine	
Primrose Cogeneration Plant	Primrose	100	1998	Canadian Natural resources, Heartland Generation	Cogen	
Rainbow Lake Generating Station	Rainbow Lake	97	1968–2001	Heartland Generation, Husky Oil		
Redwater Cogeneration	Redwater	92	2001	TransCanada	Cogen	
Scotford Air Liquide	Fort Saskatchewan	106	2000	Air Liquide Canada	Cogen	
Scotford Cogeneration Plant	Fort Saskatchewan	195	2003	Heartland Generation	Cogen	
Sheerness Generating Station	Hanna	800	1986–1990	Heartland Generation, TransAlta	Steam	
Shepard Energy Centre	Calgary	868	2015	ENMAX, Capital Power	Combined	
Sturgeon Generating Plant	Valleyview	18	1957–1961	ATCO Power		
Sundance Power Station unit 4	53°30′27″N 114°33′26″W	113	2021	TransAlta		
Sundance Generating Station	Wabamun	401	1980	TransAlta	Steam	
Three Creeks Power Plant	Peace No. 135	100	202x	Kineticor Resource Corp.		
University of Alberta Heating Plant	University of Alberta	39.7	1994–2000	University of Alberta	Cogen	
University of Calgary Central Heating and Cooling Plant	University of Calgary	12	2011	University of Calgary	Cogen	
Valleyview Generating Station	Valleyview	100	2001–2008	Heartland Generation	Turbine	
Wildwood Power Plant	Wildwood, Alberta	3.5	2022	Wildwood Power Ltd.		
Total operating stations (MW)		14140	December 2025			AESO

== Renewable ==
Facilities proposed or under construction
Decommissioned facilities (year)

=== Biomass, biogas, and waste heat recovery ===
List of all biomass, biogas and waste heat recovery power plants in Alberta
Name	Location	Capacity (MW)	Date	Owner	Type	Ref
Alberta Pacific Forest (AFG1)	Athabasca	131	1993–2012	Alberta Pacific Forest	Biomass	
Bonnybrook (BON1)	Calgary	10	2021	City of Calgary	Biomass	
Bear Creek 2 (BCR2)	Grande Prairie	36	2002	TransCanada	Biomass+waste heat	
Cancarb Waste Heat Recovery Plant (CCMH)	Medicine Hat	42	2000	Tokai Carbon Co. Ltd.	Waste heat	
Clover Bar Landfill Gas	Edmonton	5	2005	Capital Power	Biogas	
DAI1 Daishowa (DAI1); Peace River Pulp Mill	Peace River	69	1990	Daishowa-Marubeni International	Biomass	
Gold Creek Generation Facility (GOC1)	54°49′59″N 118°39′10″W	5	1999	Maxim Power	Waste heat	
Grande Prairie EcoPower (GPEC)	Grande Prairie	18	2005	Canadian Forest Products Ltd.	Biomass	
NRGreen (NRG3)	Whitecourt	16	2015	NRGreen Power Limited Partnership	Waste heat	
Slave Lake (SLP1)	Slave Lake	9	2016	West Fraser Mills Ltd.	Biomass	
Weldwood #1 (WWD1); Hinton Pulp Units 1 & 2	Hinton	50	1985–2011	West Fraser Timber	Biomass	
Westlock (WST1); Dapp Biomass Project	Dapp	16	1999	Fortistar	Biomass	
Weyerhaeuser (WEY1); Grande Prairie Pulp Mill	Grande Prairie	48	2011	International Paper Canada Pulp Holdings	Biomass	
Whitecourt Power (EAGL)	Whitecourt	25	1994	Macquarie Power & Infrastructure	Biomass	
Judy Creek ORC	Swan Hills	2.2	2012	Genalta Power	Waste Heat	
Valley Power	Drayton Valley	12	1996	Algonquin Power	Biomass	
Wheatland BioFuel Facility	Wheatland County	1	2022	Carbon Clean Energy Inc.	Biogas	
East Calgary Landfill Gas to Electricity Facility	Calgary	1	2023	City of Calgary	Biogas	

=== Geothermal ===
List of all geothermal power stations in Alberta. More than 388,500 MW of geothermal generation potential remains untapped, which is approximately 24 times Alberta's total installed generating capacity in 2019.

Name	Location	Capacity (MW)	Date	Owner	Ref
Greenview Geothermal Power Plant (Alberta No. 1)	Municipal District of Greenview No. 16	5	2023	Terrapin Geothermics	

=== Hydroelectric ===
List of all hydroelectric power stations power plants in Alberta. More than 11,500 MW of hydroelectric potential remains untapped.

Name	Location	Capacity (MW)	Date	Owner	Ref
Amisk Hydroelectric Project	55°58′47.1″N 118°48′37.2″W	370	20xx (Note: Stalled as of June 2020 yet still on track; see row references for more information (official update).)	Concord Green Energy	
Barrier Hydroelectric Dam	51°02′03.4″N 115°02′27.5″W	13	1947	TransAlta	
Bearspaw Hydroelectric Dam	51°06′03.5″N 114°16′57.6″W	17	1954	TransAlta	
Belly River Hydroelectric Dam	49°18′54.0″N 113°34′27.5″W	3	1991	TransAlta	
Bighorn Dam	52°18′32″N 116°19′45″W	120	1972	TransAlta	
Brazeau Hydroelectric Dam	52°57′59″N 115°34′44″W	355	1965	TransAlta	
Cascade Hydroelectric	51°12′00.9″N 115°30′07.7″W	36	1942	TransAlta	
Chin Reservoir Station	Chin	11.4	1994	Irrican Power	
Dickson Dam	52°03′06″N 114°13′07″W	15	1992	Algonquin Power	
Drop 4, 5, and 6 Hydroelectric Plant	Raymond	6.9	2004	Irrican Power	
Ghost Hydroelectric Dam	51°13′07.2″N 114°42′26.9″W	51	1929	TransAlta	
Horseshoe Hydroelectric Dam	51°07′03.5″N 115°02′07″W	14	1911	TransAlta	
Interlakes Hydroelectric Dam	50°38′00.4″N 115°08′21.1″W	5	1955	TransAlta	
Kananaskis Hydroelectric Dam	51°05′49.4″N 115°03′29.8″W	19	1913	TransAlta	
Oldman River Hydroelectric Plant	49°33′39.0″N 113°53′45.0″W	32	2003	ATCO Power	
Pocaterra Hydroelectric Dam	50°41′57.6″N 115°07′09.9″W	15	1955	TransAlta	
Raymond Reservoir Generating Station	Raymond	25.9	1994	Irrican Power	
Rundle Hydroelectric Dam	51°05′19.3″N 115°22′23.9″W	50	1951	TransAlta	
Spray Hydroelectric Dam	51°04′28.1″N 115°24′07.8″W	103	1951	TransAlta	
St. Mary Hydroelectric Dam	49°21′59.5″N 113°06′31.6″W	2	1992	TransAlta	
Taylor Hydroelectric Dam	Magrath	13	2000	TransAlta	
Three Sisters Hydroelectric Dam	50°59′54.7″N 115°22′30.0″W	3	1951	TransAlta	
Waterton Hydroelectric Dam	49°19′44.6″N 113°40′22.2″W	3	1992	TransAlta	
	Total operating stations (MW)	899	December 2025		AESO

=== Wind ===
List of all wind farms power stations in Alberta
Name	Location	Capacity (MW)	Date	Owner	Ref
Ardenville Wind Farm (ARD1)	Fort Macleod	66	2010	TransAlta	
Blackspring Ridge (BSR1)	Vulcan County	300	2014	EDF Renewables, Enbridge	
Blue Trail (BTR1)	Fort Macleod	66	2009	TransAlta	
Buffalo Atlee (BFL1)	Special Area No. 2	18	2023	Capstone Infrastructure	
Buffalo Atlee (BFL2)	Special Area No. 2	18	2023	Capstone Infrastructure	
Buffalo Atlee (BFL3)	Special Area No. 2	18	2023	Capstone Infrastructure	
Buffalo Atlee (BFL4)	Special Area No. 2	18	2023	Capstone Infrastructure	
Buffalo Plains Wind Farm (BPW1)	Lomond	466	2024	Copenhagen Infrastructure Partners	
Bull Creek (BUL1 and BUL2)	Provost	29	2015	BluEarth Renewables	
Castle River (CR1)	Pincher Creek	44	2000	TransAlta	
Castle Rock Wind Farm (CRR1)	Drumheller	77	2012	Enel	
Castle Rock Ridge 2 (CRR2)	Pincher Creek	29	2020	Enel Green Power	
Chin Chute (SCR3)	Taber	30	2006	Acciona, Enbridge, Suncor Energy	
Cowley Ridge (CRE3)	Cowley	20	2001	TransAlta	
Cypress 1 (CYP1); Cypress Wind Power Project	Forty Mile	196	2023	EDF Renewables	
Cypress 2 (CYP2)	Forty Mile	46	2023	EDF Renewables	
Forty Mile Bow Island (FRM1)	Forty Mile	266	2024	RES	
Forty Mile Granlea (FMG1)	Forty Mile	220	2022	ATCO	
Garden Plain (GDP1); Garden Plain	County of Paintearth No. 18	130	2023	TransAlta	
Ghost Pine Wind Energy Centre (NEP1)	Drumheller	82	2010	NextEra	
Grizzly Bear Creek (GRZ1); Grizzly Bear Wind Power Project	Minburn County No. 27	152	2023	Enel Green Power	
Halkirk (HAL1)	Halkirk	150	2012	Capital Power	
Halkirk Wind Project Phase 2 (HAL2)	Paintearth County No. 18	126	2024	CapitalPower	
Hand Hills (HHW1); Hand Hills	Starland County	145	2023	BluEarth Renewables	
Hilda Wind (HLD1); Hilda Wind	Cypress County	100	2023	RES Canada	
Jenner 1 (JNR1); Jenner Wind Project (Phase 1)	Special Area No. 2	122	2023	Potentia Renewables Inc.	
Jenner 2 (JNR2); Jenner Wind Project (Phase 2)	Special Area No. 2	71	2023	Potentia Renewables Inc.	
Jenner 3 (JNR3); Jenner Wind Project (Phase 3)	Special Area No. 2	109	2023	Potentia Renewables Inc.	
Kettles Hill (KHW1)	Pincher Creek	63	2006	Enmax	
Lanfine Wind (LAN1)	Special Area No. 3	151.2	2023	Pattern Energy	
Macleod Flats	Fort Macleod	3	2004	TransAlta	
Magrath (SCR2)	Magrath	30	2004	Acciona, Enbridge, Suncor Energy	
McBride Lake (AKE1)	Fort Macleod	75	2003	Enmax, TransAlta	
Oldman River Wind Project	Pincher Creek	3.6	2007	Alberta Wind Energy Corporation	
Oldman 2 (OWF1)	Pincher Creek	46	2014	Mainstream Renewable Power	
Paintearth Wind Project (PAW1)	Special Area No. 18	198	2023	Potentia Renewables Inc.	
Rattlesnake Ridge (RTL1)	Whitla	130	2022	Berkshire Hathaway Energy Canada	
Riverview (RIV1)	Pincher Creek	105	2020	Enel Green Power	
Sharp Hills (SHH1)	Special Area 3	297.1	2023	EDP Renewables	
Sinnott	Cowley	7	2001	TransAlta	
Soderglen (GWW1)	Fort Macleod	70.5	2006	Nexen, TransAlta	
Stirling Wind Phase 1 (SWP1)	Warner County No. 5	113	2023	Greengate Power Corporation	
Summerview 1 (IEW1)	Pincher Creek	70	2004	TransAlta	
Summerview 2 (IEW2)	Pincher Creek	66	2010	TransAlta	
Taber Wind Farm (TAB1)	Taber	80	2007	Enmax	
Whitla Wind 1 (WHT1)	Forty Mile	202	2019	Capital Power	
Whitla Wind 2 (WHT2)	Forty Mile	151	2021	Capital Power	
Windrise (WRW1)	Fort Macleod	206.4	2021	TransAlta	
Wild Rose 2	Cypress County	192	2024	Capstone Infrastructure	
Winnifred Wind Project (WIN1)	Forty Mile	136	2024	Enerfin Energy	
Wheatland (WHE1)	Wheatland County	122.4	2022	Greengate Power Corporation	
Wintering Hills Wind Farm (SCR4)	Drumheller	88	2011	Suncor	
Buffalo Trail North Wind Project	Cypress County	200	2028	ENGIE Development Canada LP	
Forty Mile Wind Project Phase 2	Forty Mile	119.7	Q3 2025	RES	
Northern Valley Wind Project	Two Hills County No. 21	75	2024	Elemental Energy	
Bull Trail Wind	Cypress County	270	2026	EDF Renewables	
	Total operating stations (MW)	5684	December 2025		AESO

=== Solar ===
List of all solar power stations in Alberta
Name	Location	Capacity (MW)	Date	Owner	Ref
Barlow Solar (BLS1); Barlow Solar Park	Calgary	31	2023	DP Energy	
Big Sky Solar (ACD1)	Acadia No. 34	140	2024	RES	
Brooks Solar (BSC1)	Brooks	15	2017	Elemental Energy	
Brooks Solar 1 (BRK1); Brooks Solar II Project	Brooks	13	2022	Elemental Energy	
Brooks Solar 2 (BRK2); Brooks Solar II Project	Brooks	14	2022	Elemental Energy	
Burdett (BRD1); Alberta Solar One Project	Burdett	10.5	2021	Enbridge, Morgan Solar Inc	
Burdett Solar (BUR1)	Burdett	20	2021	BluEarth Renewables	
Chappice Lake (CHP1); Chappice Lake Solar Storage Project	Cypress County	14	2023	Elemental Energy	
Claresholm 1 (CLR1); Claresholm Solar Project	Claresholm	58	2021	Capstone Infrastructure	
Claresholm 2 (CLR2); Claresholm Solar Project	Claresholm	75	2021	Capstone Infrastructure	
Clydesdale 1 (CLY1); Clydesdale Solar Project	Municipal District of Taber	41	2022	Capital Power	
Clydesdale 2 (CLY2); Clydesdale Solar Project	Municipal District of Taber	34	2022	Capital Power	
Coaldale (COL1); Coaldale Solar Project	Lethbridge County	23	2022	ACFN, Concord Coaldale Partnership	
Conrad 1 (CRD1); Wrentham Solar Project	Wrentham	23	2023	Solar Krafte	
Conrad 2 (CRD2); Wrentham Solar Project	Wrentham	18	2023	Solar Krafte	
Deerfoot Solar Park (DFT1)	Calgary	41	2023	DP Energy	
Duchess Solar (DUS1)	Duchess	20	2026	Gin Solar Limited	
East Strathmore Namaka (NMK1); East Strathmore Solar Project	Wheatland County	20.5	2022	Elemental Energy	
Empress (EMP1)	Empress	39	2023	Achernar GP Ltd	
Fox Coulée Solar Project (FCS1)	Starland County	80	2023	Neoen \ Subra LP	
Fox Coulée Solar Project (FCS1)	Starland County	80	2023	Neoen \ Subra LP	
Gleichen Solar (GLE1)	Strathcona County	13	2025	Tiu Canada Solar Project Ltd	
HAYS (HYS1)		23			
Hull (HUL1); Prairie Sunlight II Project	Vauxhall	25	2020	Solar Krafte Utilities	
Innisfail (INF1) Innisfail Solar	Innisfail	22	2020	Elemental Energy	
Jenner (JER1) Canadian Solar Solutions Project	Jenner	23	2021	BluEarth Renewables	
Joffre Solar 1 (JFS1)	Joffre	25	2023	PACE Canada LP	
Joffre Solar 2 (JFS2)	Joffre	22	2023	PACE Canada LP	
kisikaw-pisim 1 (KKP1) kīsikāw pīsim Project	Edmonton	7	2022	Epcor	
kisikaw-pisim 2 (KKP2) kīsikāw pīsim Project	Edmonton	7	2022	Epcor	
Kneehill Solar (TRH1) Kneehill Solar Generation Facility	Kneehill County	25	2023	Capstone Infrastructure	
Lethbridge Solar (CLD1)	Lethbridge	9	2024	Lethbridge One Solar Corp	
Michichi Creek (MCH1) Drumheller Solar and Battery Storage Project	Drumheller	14	2023	Concord Green Energy	
Michichi Solar (MIC1) Michichi Solar Generation Facility	Starland County	25	2023	Capstone Infrastructure	
Monarch (MON1) Monarch Solar	Lethbridge County	24	2022	Concord Coaldale Partnership	
Saddlebrook Solar Project (SDL1)	Foothills County	81	2023	TC Energy Corporation	
Scottford Refinery Solar Farm (Note: Off-grid.)	Strathcona County	58	2023	Silicon Ranch	
Sollair Solar Energy Plant (SCR1)	Airdrie	75	2024	General Land and Power	
Spring Coulee Solar (SGC1)	Spring Coulee	30	2023	Solar Krafte	
Strathmore 1 (STR1) Strathmore Solar	Strathmore	18	2022	Capital Power	
Strathmore 2 (STR2) Strathmore Solar	Strathmore	23	2022	Capital Power	
Stavely (STV1)	Stavely	17	2023	Concord Stavely Partnership	
Suffield (SUF1) Suffield Solar	Suffield	23	2020	Suffield Solar GP Inc.	
Three Nations Energy Solar Farm	Fort Chipewyan	2.2	2020	Three Nations Energy (joint venture)	
Tilley Solar Farm	Tilley	24	2025	Concord Tilley Partnership	
Travers (TVS1) Travers Solar Project	Vulcan County	465	2022	Greengate Power	
Vauxhall (VXH1) Prairie Sunlight III Project	Taber	22	2020	Solar Krafte Utilities	
Vulcan (VCN1)	Vulcan County	22	2022	EDP Renewables	
Westfield Yellow Lake (WEF1) Yellow Lake Solar	Forty Mile	19	2021	BluEarth Renewables	
Wheatcrest Solar Project (WCR1)	Taber	50	2023	BluEarth Renewables	
Youngstown Solar (YNG1)	Youngstown	6	2023	PACE Canada LP	
	Total operating stations (MW)	1850	December 2025		AESO

== Storage ==
=== Battery ===
List of all lithium-ion battery storage plants in Alberta
Name	Location	Power Capacity (MW)	Energy Capacity (MWh)	Date	Owner	Ref
eReserve1 Rycroft (ERV1)	Spirit River	20	35	2020	Teric Power Ltd	
eReserve2 Buffalo Creek (ERV2)	Wainwright	20	35	2021	Teric Power Ltd	
eReserve3 Mercer Hill (ERV3)	Grande Prairie	20	35	2022	Teric Power Ltd	
eReserve4 (ERV4)	Hardisty	20	35	2023	TERIC Power Ltd	
eReserve5 Hughenden (ERV5)	Hughenden	20	35	January 16, 2023	TERIC Power Ltd	
eReserve6 (ERV6)	Hardisty	20	35	2023	TERIC Power Ltd	
eReserve7 (ERV7)	Wapiti	20	20	2023		
eReserve8 (ERV8)	Wapiti	20	20	2023		
eReserve9 (ERV9)	Hythe	20	20	2023		
Summerview (SUM1); WindCharger	Pincher Creek	10	20	2020	TransAlta	
Whitla Storage Project	Whitla	200	2400	202x	Teric Power Ltd	
Total operating stations (MW)		190		December 2025		AESO

=== Flow battery ===
List of all flow battery plants in Alberta
Name	Location	Power capacity (MW)	Energy capacity (MWh)	Date	Owner	Ref
Saddlebrook Storage Project	Foothills County	6.5	40	Q4 2024	TC Energy	

=== Pumped hydroelectric ===
List of all pumped hydroelectric storage plants in Alberta.

Name	Location	Power capacity (MW)	Energy capacity (MWh)	Date	Owner	Ref
Canyon Creek	Yellowhead County	75–400 (Note: Initially 75 MW; expandable to 400 MW.)	~2775	202x	Turning Point Generation, TC Energy	
Brazeau Hydro Pumped Storage (Note: Pump-back expansion of existing hydroelectric dam site.)	52°57′59″N 115°34′44″W	900	5,000	2025–2026	TransAlta	

=== Geomechanical pumped ===
List of all geomechanical pumped storage plants in Alberta.

Name	Location	Power capacity (MW)	Energy capacity (MWh)	Date	Owner	Ref
	Brooks			202x	Quidnet	

== Historical ==
Decommissioned facilities (year)

=== Coal ===
Partial list of retired coal power plants in Alberta. There are no active coal generating stations in Alberta.

Name	Location	Capacity (MW)	Date	Owner	Ref
Genesee Generating Station unit 2	53°20′35″N 114°18′11″W	420	(2024)	Capital Power	
Genesee Generating Station unit 3	53°20′35″N 114°18′11″W	466	(2024)	Capital Power	
Battle River Generating Station units 1 & 2	Forestburg	(56)	(1998)	Heartland Generation	
Keephills Generating Station unit 1	Duffield	395	(2021)	TransAlta	-
Keephills Generating Station unit 3	Duffield	466	(2021)	Capital Power	
Sundance Power Station units 4 & 5	53°30′27″N 114°33′26″W	812	(2021)	TransAlta	
H. R. Milner Generating Station	Grande Cache	(158)	(2019)	Milner Power	
Wabamun Generating Station Units 1–4	Wabamun	(570)	(2003–2010)	TransAlta	

== See also ==
- ATCO
- EPCOR
- TransAlta
- TransCanada
- Energy in Canada
- List of power stations in Canada
