= Paul Band =

First Nations band government based in Canada

Paul First Nation
- Band No. 441
- Treaty: Treaty 6
- Headquarters: Duffield
- Province: Alberta

Land
- Main reserve: Wabamun 133A
- Reserves: Buck Lake 133C; Wabamun 133B
- Land area: 73.306 km^{2} (28.304 sq mi)

Population (2026)
- On reserve: 1524
- Off reserve: 818
- Total population: 2342

Government
- Chief: Casey Bird

Website
- http://www.paulfirstnation.com/

The Paul First Nation, more commonly known as the Paul Band, is a First Nations band government based in Wabamun, Alberta of mixed Cree and Nakoda (Stoney) origin. They are party to Treaty Six and had the Buck Lake Indian Reserve 133C and Wabamun Lake Indian Reserve 133A, 133B and 133C allocated to them by the federal government in 1892. However, the Buck Lake Reserve was decimated by the Spanish Flu of 1918 and is now largely abandoned.

As of August 2026, the nation had 2,342 registered members, of which 1,524 lived on-reserve.

Paul Band's Wabamun 133A and 133B lands are located along Lake Wabumun, approximately 70 km (43 mi) west of Edmonton. The lake is a popular destination for Alberta to spend weekends and holidays, and the band operates the Ironhead Golf and Country Club to appeal to this market.

In April 2010, there was a devastating costly wildfire that caused community members to flee.

== Demographics ==
The Paul Band signed a treaty in 1876 and settled on the eastern edge of Lake Wabamun. While the total population of the Paul Band was 1397, 856 individuals were living on the Paul Band Reserve in 1996. By 1998 there were 1,400 members of the Paul First Nation. The majority were Stoney and the remainder Cree. In Alberta the Nakoda were known as Stoney. They were also grouped by the Cree term Assiniboine. They all speak common Siouan language but according to Bird, "there are differences in dialects spoken between the groups in Alberta and also between those in Alberta and those in Saskatchewan and Montana."

== History ==
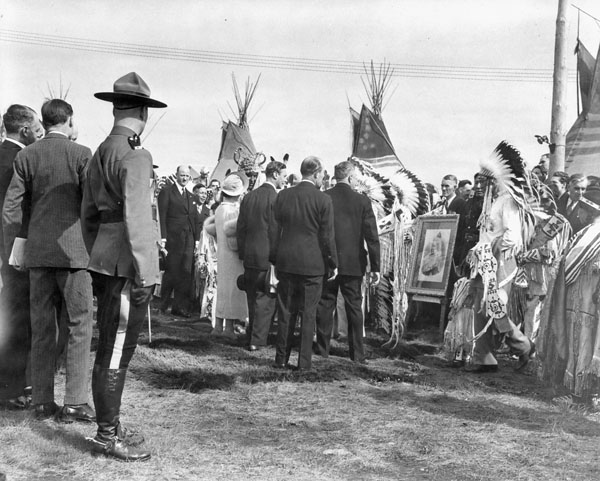
King George VI and Queen Elizabeth greet chieftains of the Stoney Indian Tribe, who have brought a photo of Queen Victoria, during the Royal Visit to Canada in 1939. The Treaties were originally signed by representatives of the British Crown acting in Queen Victoria's name.

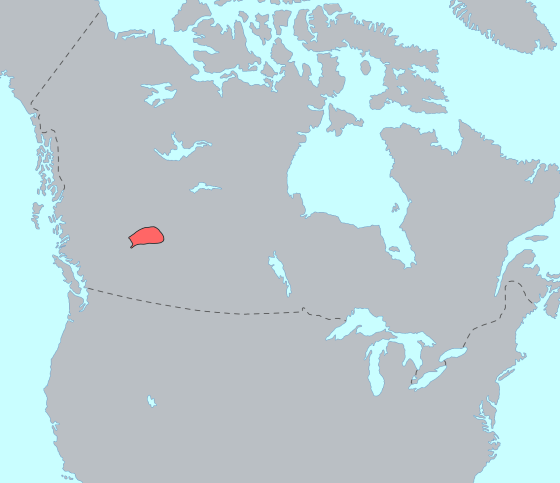
Stoney language

The Stoney are descendants of individual bands of Dakota, Lakota and Nakota, in particular of western groups of Assiniboine, from which they spun out as an independent group at about 1744. The Stoney were divided geographically and culturally into two tribal groups or divisions with different dialects, which in turn were further divided into several bands.

Of all the Siouan speaking groups, the Paul Band and the Alexis Band were the farthest north and west. In her thesis Ruby Bird, daughter of then Chief Bird, summarized Andersen's three possibilities regarding the Paul and Alexis' Bands in pre-treaty times,

"There are several possible explanations as to their location and cultural position in pre-treaty times. Andersen offers several tentative explanations:

(1) The Stoney located roughly between the Athabasca and North Saskatchewan Rivers west of Edmonton may have followed a westward migration route along the forested edge of the northern Plains;

(2) the area occupied by the immediate pre-1877 predecessors of the Alexis and Paul's Bands of Stoney was within mach and perhaps regularly exploited by largely pedestrian Stoney by about 1795 or even earlier;

(3) they may have entered this area prior to getting horses;

(4) the Grand River Assiniboine first distinguished in 1775 may be the immediate predecessors of the modem Alexis and Paul's band."

— Bird 1998, Andersen

By 1880, about a half of the Alexis Band led by Ironhead separated and were living at Wabamun Lake where the land and fishing was better than the lands assigned to the Alexis band as a reserve when they signed Treaty Six in 1876. The chief of the Alexis Band was Catholic and was not tolerant of other religions. The Wabamum Lake band were Protestant.

By 1892, the federal government realized the two bands, the Alexis and the Wabamun Lake band had irreconcilable differences and therefore created a second reserve for the Paul Band settled at White Whale Lake. The reserve name was changed to Wabamun Lake Indian Reserve. Paul Band was named after the head man at the time. According to government documents, Paul's brother Ironhead, had led them to Wabamun Lake, but Ironhead died before the reserve was officially founded. The reserve was called Wabamun Lake Indian Reserve and the Band was called Paul Band. Eventually the popular name for the reserve became Paul Band.

In September 2024, they became a signatory of the Buffalo Treaty.

== Wabamun Lake ==
Ironhead had moved his band to Wabamun Lake by 1880 because the fishing was good there. There are rolling aspen hills and good land surrounding the lake.

Starting around 1850, the mission at Lac Ste. Anne began fishing nearby lakes to provide fish to customers in Edmonton.

By 2003, the lake was described as one of the most heavily used lakes in Alberta by limnologist David Schindler. It is also one of the most popular recreational lakes in Alberta.

Paul Band First Nation Reserve is on the east end of the lake. There is a village, Wabamun, and a number of summer villages and subdivisions on the lake shore. The Yellowhead Highway and CNR railroad tracks parallel the north shore. There are coal mines north and south of the lake as well as TransAlta's Wabamun (now decommissioned) and Sundance power plants and cooling ponds for the Sundance and Keephills power plants. There is Wabamun Lake Provincial Park at Moonlight Bay and a golf course managed by the Paul Band First Nation Reserve.

Since 1912, Lake Wabamun water levels have been "repeatedly and illegally modified" by "different groups wishing to regulate lake levels at either very high or very low levels."

Twenty two percent of the catchment basin of Lake Wabamun has been disturbed by two coal mines, the Highvale, covering 12,600 hectares, the largest coal mine in Canada and the Whitewood mine. Strip mining involves remove overburden to expose the coal seam that is then mined in distinct strips. By 2004, these two mines had disturbed 5,593 ha of the Lake Wabamun catch basin.

The vast majority of the coal burning in Alberta occurs approximately 70 km west of Edmonton, in the Wabumun Lake area. The Wabamun Generating Station, a coal fired plant owned by TransAlta, located next to the village of Wabamun, Alberta was first commissioned in 1956 and decommissioned in 2010 with the smoke stacks demolished in March 2011. The station's primary source of fuel was sub bituminous from the Whitewood mine.

According to CASA and cited in David Schindler's 2003 report commissioned by Alberta Environment the combined emissions of the coal-fired plants in the Wabumun Lake area, emitted,

...65% of airborne mercury from industrial sources in the province, as well as several other trace metals, sulfate, particulates, water vapour, nitrogen oxides and polycyclic aromatic hydrocarbons. About 74% of Alberta's CO_{2} emissions from coal-fired power plants are emitted from the power plants near Lake Wabamun."

— CASA 2003

Although mercury levels in fish for consumption meet guidelines for occasional use, Schindler cautioned that for the Paul Band subsistence consumers some concern remains in the consumption of large pike that exceed mercury levels in Lake Wabamun.

On 3 August 2005 more than 1.3 million liters (290,000 imp gal; 340,000 U.S. gal) of bunker oil and other chemicals spilled into Lake Wabamun when faulty tracks caused 40 rail cars to derail in the Wabumun village. Two years later there were health cautions still issued, warning users of the Lake to avoid oil patches and tar balls in Lake Wabamun.

== Education ==
In the summer of 1893 the White Whale Lake Methodist Day School was opened at Paul Band reserve run by the resident Methodist missionary. In the fall of 1893 the Methodist Church began operating the Red Deer Methodist Indian Industrial School.

Paul Band school age children attended the Edmonton Residential School and the St Albert Residential School approximately between the years 1923 and 1950.

== Social issues ==
In an interview with elder Alexie Simon, published in the 1998 Bird thesis, Simon claimed that Paul Band changed dramatically for the worse after the right to have alcohol on the reserve was granted by the Government of Alberta in 1966.

"Before that time everything seemed to be alright amongst natives. People attended the churches of their faith, good behaviour was everywhere, respect for each other. Young people honoured their parents. Since 1966 when liquor rights were granted to native people, we have lost all that I have mentioned."

— Elder Alexie Simon

In 2011, the band faced a $3 million deficit which shut down many social services such as school buses and transportation to medical appointments. In 2011, the band's estimated budget was $14 million. In 2011 they received $8.5 million from Aboriginal Affairs and Northern Development Canada. In 2001, the Band had to take on a co-manager. "Budgets, set at the band level but approved in Ottawa, are formed based on prior year revenues; in years when oil and gas revenues from the band’s Buck Lake property fluctuate, that can affect the flow of funds back to the band from AANDC... Other stressors include a demand for housing and for road repairs, as well as a recent evacuation from wildfires."

== See also ==
- List of communities in Alberta
- List of Indian reserves in Alberta
