= Valley Power =

Valley Power may refer to:

- Drayton Valley Power, a biomass power station in Alberta, Canada
- Valley Power Peaking Facility in Victoria, Australia
- Valley Power Plant in Wisconsin, USA
- Valley Power, Inc., an electrical wholesale supplier in Willow Grove, Pennsylvania
