= Drayton Valley Power =

Canadian biomass electricity generating station

- Country: Canada
- Location: Drayton Valley
- Status: closed
- Commission date: 1997
- Owner: Algonquin Power

Thermal power station
- Primary fuel: Wood waste

Power generation
- Nameplate capacity: 12 MW

Drayton Valley Power is a 12MW biomass electricity generating station near Drayton Valley, Alberta, Canada, about 120 km west of Edmonton. The facility is operated by Algonquin Power, and uses wood refuse from the nearby Weyerhaeuser sawmill.

This facility is constructed of equipment that was originally located at North Fork, California in the United States. It was moved to Alberta in 1996 when logging near North Fork was prohibited to protect spotted owl habitat, thus ending the plant’s fuel supply.

Operations on the current site commenced in 1997, after the plant was re-commissioned by Yankee Energy for Drayton Valley Power Ltd. It was the first facility of the Drayton Valley Power Income Fund, and was the subject of its initial public offering (IPO) in 1997. Up to 10.5MW of facility capacity is sold to TransAlta Utilities Corporation annually pursuant to a long-term power purchase contract (The Drayton power purchase agreement), and any excess is sold exclusively to the Alberta Power Pool at the pool price.

The plant burns wood waste provided by the sawmill that manufactures dimensional lumber, without charge, to heat water and create steam. The facility consists of a boiler (Wickes Boiler - 1953) and a GE steam-turbine generator (1953) retrofitted with a bubbling fluidized bed when it was reconstructed at the new site. With only 21 employees this is one of the smallest grid producers in Alberta.

== See also ==
- List of power stations in Alberta
