= Whitewood mine =

Coal mine in Alberta, Canada

Whitewood is a closed Canadian coal mine in Alberta just north of Lake Wabamun, about sixty-five kilometres west of Edmonton, Alberta. Owned by the TransAlta Corporation of Calgary, the mine was run by Luscar Ltd. (Edmonton) since that company acquired the extraction contract from Fording Coal Ltd. (Calgary) in 2003 until closure in 2010.

== Geology ==
Development of the pemi site at Whitewood and the seismic testing done there in the 1980s have allowed geologists to establish the timeframe and geologic phases associated with the formation of the mine's coal bed. Analysis has shown that there are six distinct coal seams present at Whitewood, with deposits from the late Cretaceous found at the deepest intervals, and with Early Tertiary formations found closest to the top.

A few layers of bentonitic gangue appear throughout the coal, most notably a three-metre seam near the uppermost portion of the late Cretaceous zone. Above the twenty to seventy metre thick coal-bearing deposit lies a glacial till several metres deep; this must be removed from the surface before mining of the coal below can begin.

== History ==
Opened in 1962, the Whitewood mine operated on a "strip" model, harvesting approximately 2.8 megatonnes of sub-bituminous coal per annum. Most of this thermal coal was used for steam-driven power generation at the Wabamun, Sundance, and Keephills power plants, but a small amount of coal was sold to the residents of Parkland County for personal uses.

The Whitewood mine covered approximately 4700 hectares of slightly hilly prairie, with locales of forest and wetland interspersed throughout. The 2,800,000 tonnes of coal mined there each year was enough fuel to fulfil approximately 13% of Alberta's electrical energy requirements. As a strip-surface mine, Whitewood employed the use of heavy equipment — excavators, loaders/shovels, dumpers, and the like — to extract the coal in an efficient and cost-sensible manner. Post-mining processing included pulverisation, to maximise thermal yields when the coal is burnt in one of the surrounding power stations.

Although the 2000s rate of extraction would have allowed the site's fifty-one million tonnes of reserves to be mined for more than a decade, TransAlta ceased production in 2010, the same year the company completed the decommissioning of its coal-fired Wabamun electrical generation facility nearby. The company continued mining coal at the massive Highvale mine five kilometres to the southwest; that mine produces 12.9 megatonnes of sub-bituminous coal per annum, has reserves pegged at over 200 megatonnes, and will be able to fuel the power plants now served by Whitewood, in addition to the Genesee power station.

== Environmental considerations ==
Reclamation of the mine was completed in 2015. An important part of decommissioning a mine is the reclamation process that follows. TransAlta had made provisions for ecological restoration to continue until 2013, three years after the Whitewood mine was slated to close. The coal-depleted portions of the site were subject to restoration, with pits being reclaimed as lakes or being filled with backfill. Much of the backfill land was laid with local subsoil and rich topsoil, which made the land suitable for agricultural use; the other parts of the reclaimed land were converted into forests and wetlands reflecting the pre-mining environment.

Once the mine was fully out of service, the power lines, service roads, sedimentation ponds, ditches, and other mining infrastructure were removed, and the lands were reconverted to their original forms. Now that vegetation has taken root and grown, the mining site shows little evidence of having hosted a mine.
