= Wolfe Island Wind Farm =

Wind farm on Wolfe Island, Ontario, Canada

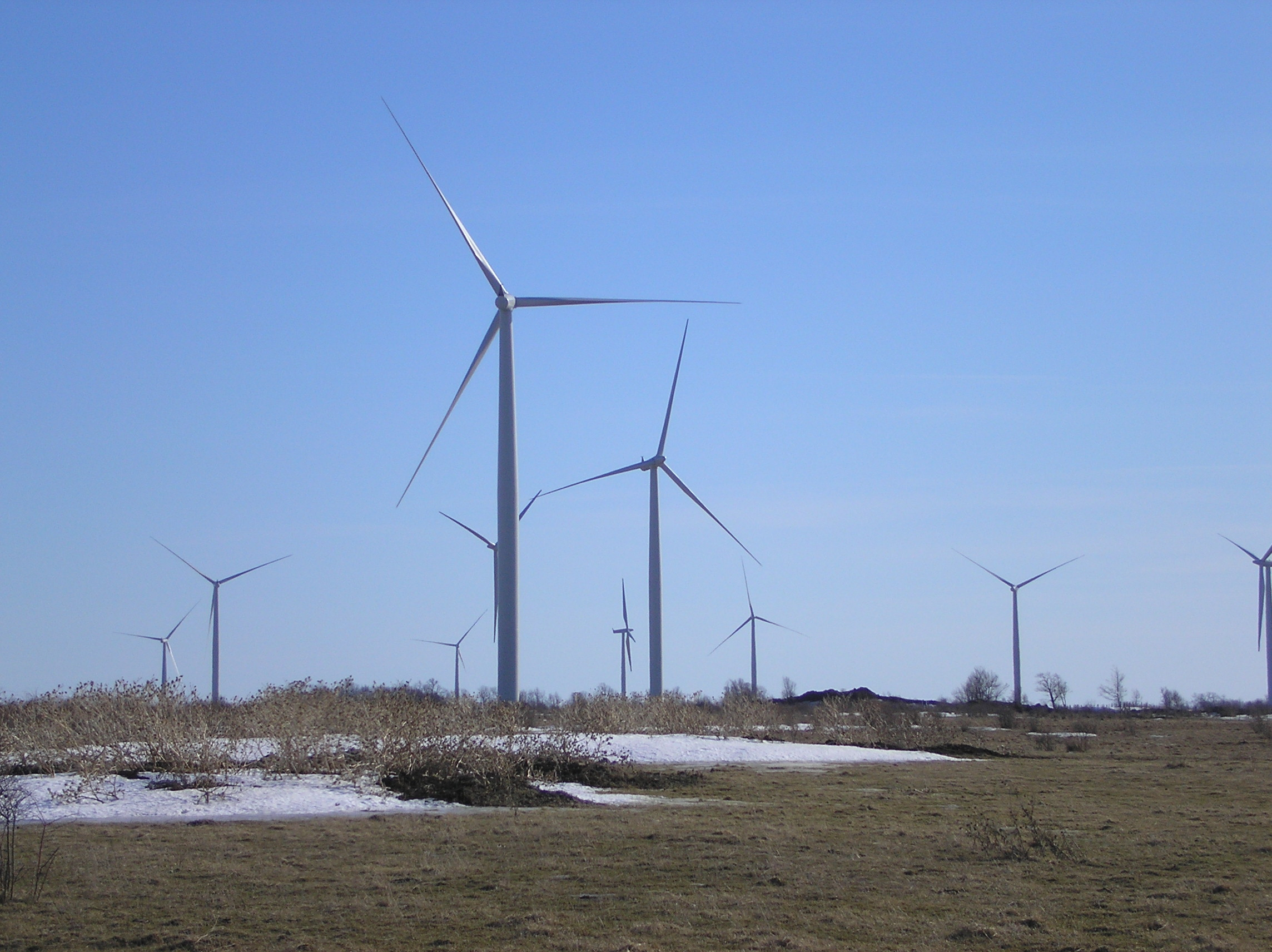
- Wolfe Island Wind Farm located on Wolfe Island, Ontario, within the Township of Frontenac Islands.
- Country: Canada
- Location: Wolfe Island, Ontario (near Kingston, Ontario)
- Coordinates: 44°10′N 76°28′W
- Status: Operational
- Owners: Canadian Hydro Developers, Inc.
- Operators: Canadian Hydro Developers, Inc.

Power generation
- Units operational: 86 x 2.3-megawatt (MW)
- Make and model: Siemens: Mark II
- Nameplate capacity: 197.8 MW

External links
- Commons: Related media on Commons

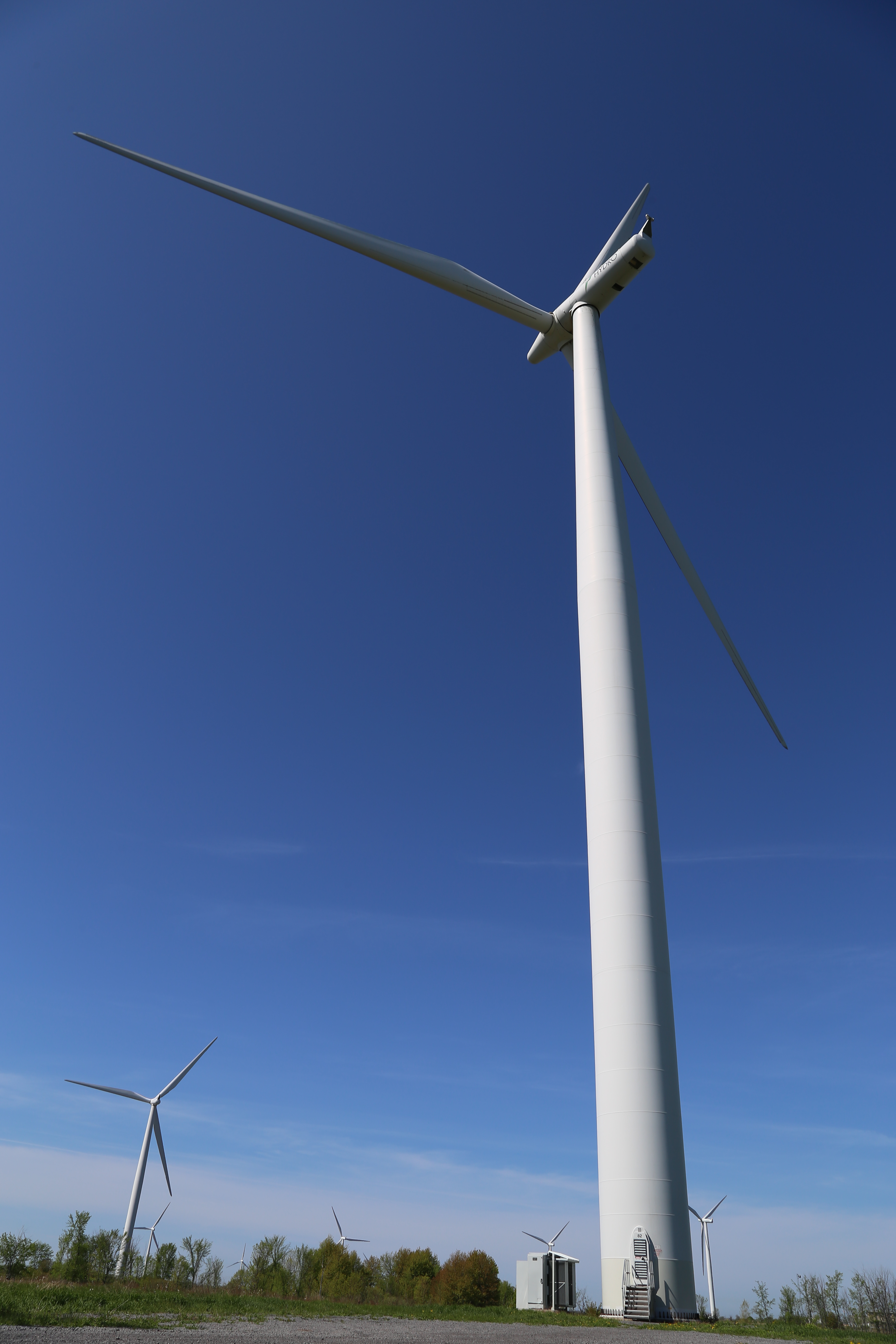
This is one of the many wind turbines on Wolfe Island, Ontario, Canada.

Wolfe Island Wind Farm is a large wind farm project located on Wolfe Island, Ontario (near Kingston, Ontario). The wind farm became operational on June 29, 2009. It is owned and operated by Canadian Hydro Developers, Inc., through its subsidiary Canadian Renewable Energy Corporation (CREC). The power will be purchased by Hydro One for distribution to consumers.

The wind farm consists of eighty-six 2.3-megawatt (MW) Siemens model Mark II wind turbines situated on the western portion of Wolfe Island.

Once completed, the 197.8 MW project was expected to generate approximately 594 gigawatt-hours (GW·h) of renewable power annually; enough to supply about 75,000 average households. Over its first four full years of operation, generation proved to be around 495 GWh annually (see below).

Winds of 3.5 to 4 metres per second (11 to 13 ft/s) are required to generate power; when winds are less than 3 metres per second (9.8 ft/s), then power is not being generated.

== Key project components ==
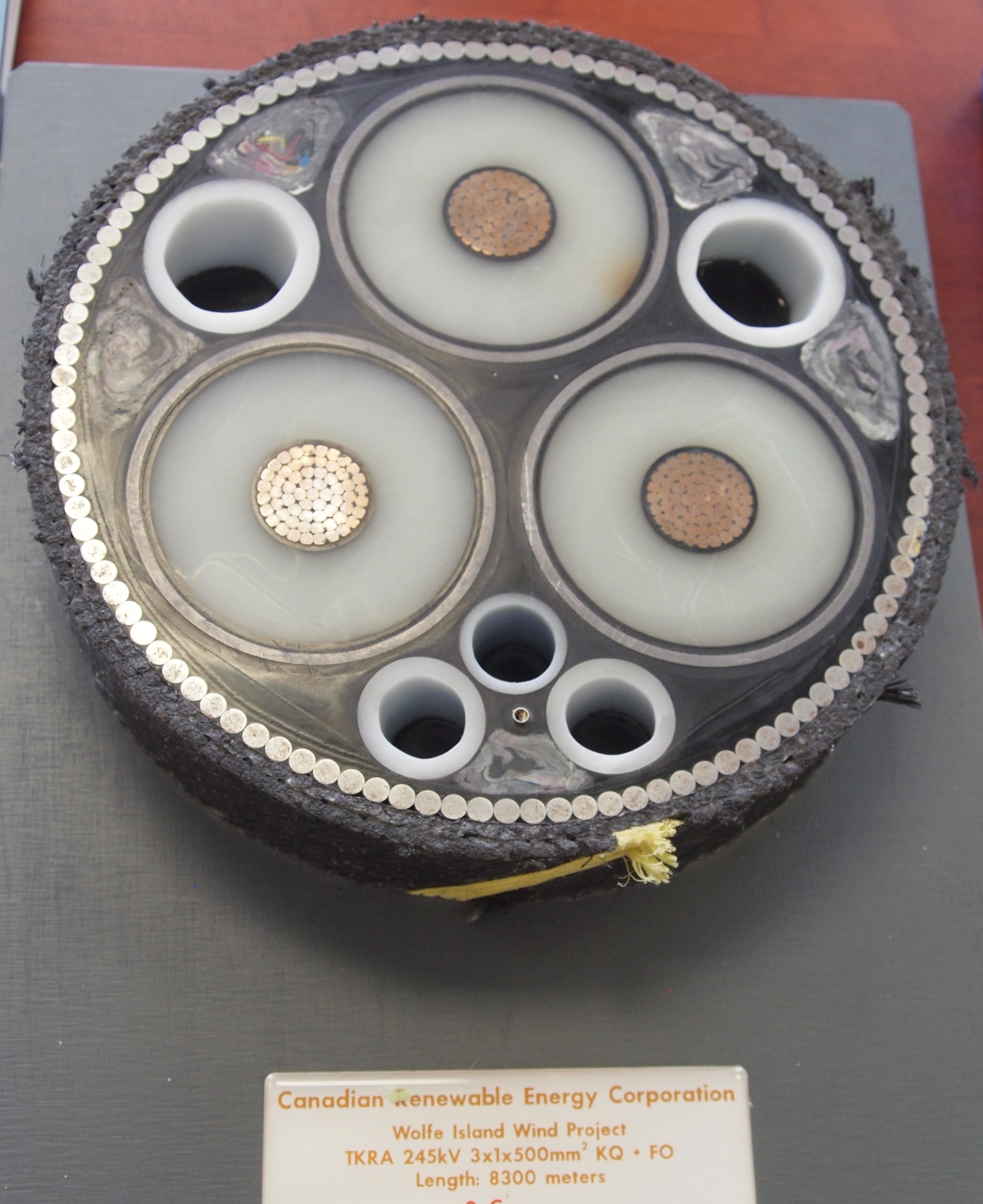
Cross section of submarine power cable used in Wolfe Island Wind Project. The world's first 3-core XLPE submarine cable to achieve a 245 kV voltage rating.

- padmount transformers at the base of each wind turbine
- access roads
- a 34.5-kilovolt (kV) electrical line collector system
- a 34.5 / 230 kV transformer station
- a 230 kV electrical line system provided by Nexans
- 230 kV interconnection facilities with the provincial grid at Hydro One's Gardiners Transformer Station
- an operations and maintenance building.

CREC has optioned a total of approximately 2513 hectares (6,209 acres) of land for the proposed wind development.

The facility will provide green jobs and generate landowner and community income through royalties, taxes, and the amenities agreement. Canadian Hydro has built a visitor centre at its property on the 5th line.

The 2010 Bird and Bat report commissioned by Transalta, a component of the Post Construction Follow-up Plan (PCFP), states that over the first six months of operation bird mortality due to blade strike was 602 birds of which 13 were raptors. That reflects 6.99 birds per turbine over six months (almost 14 strikes per turbine per year). The industry standard for comparable wind facilities is generally 2 bird strikes per turbine per year. Over 1270 bats were killed in the same six-month period. The development is in a globally and continentally significant Important Bird Area. The PCFP was designed in response to stakeholder concerns over potential negative effects on bird populations, and is a partnership between Transalta, the Environment Canada and provincial Ministry of Natural Resources.

== Production ==
Production (MWh)
Year	January	February	March	April	May	June	July	August	September	October	November	December	Total
2009					4,615	6,792	21,328	24,330	28,049	46,907	32,110	52,551	216,682
2010	40,500	30,839	54,313	40,941	31,088	25,053	25,079	29,767	46,278	47,636	47,039	50,819	469,352
2011	32,303	56,015	43,156	54,849	44,238	26,754	18,099	25,124	27,543	49,068	64,780	54,010	495,939
2012	55,585	51,178	48,738	44,933	29,658	34,323	20,894	28,393	35,549	54,090	40,945	51,070	495,356
2013	56,505	42,337	44,164	57,735	40,331	22,975	24,386	24,754	28,798	46,608	68,831	41,396	498,820
2014	73,346	46,498	57,045	44,469	40,488	23,320	33,237	24,695	32,019	54,268	41,140		470,525

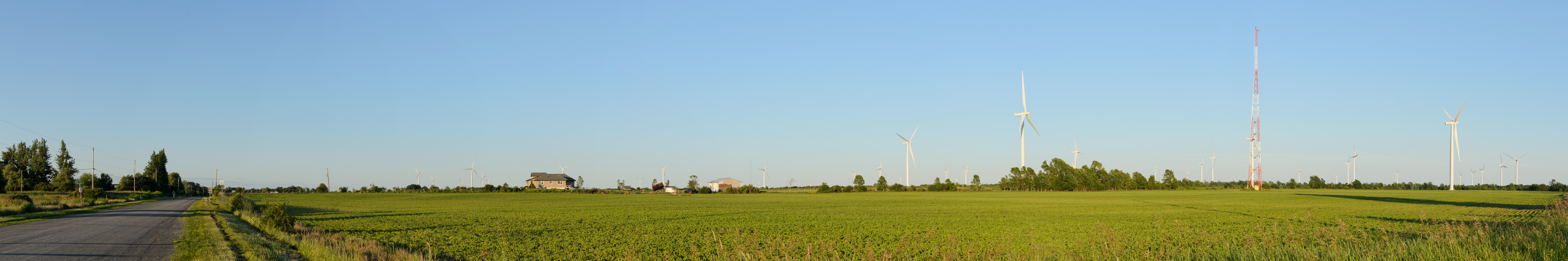
Panorama of Wolfe Island Wind Farm

== See also ==
- List of wind farms in Canada
- List of onshore wind farms
- List of offshore wind farms
