= Wabamun 133A =

- Indian reserve
- Location of Wabamun 133A in Alberta Wabamun 133A (Canada)
- Coordinates: 53°30′N 114°25′W
- Country: Canada
- Province: Alberta
- Region: Edmonton Metropolitan Region
- Census division: 11

Government
  - Chief: Daniel Paul
  - Governing body: Paul First Nation

Area
  - Land: 62.54 km^{2} (24.15 sq mi)

Population (2006)
  - Total: 1,088
  - Density: 17.4/km^{2} (45/sq mi)
- Time zone: UTC−06:00 (Alberta Time)
- Area codes: 780, 587, 825, 368

Wabamun 133A is a First Nations reserve in central Alberta, Canada, in Division No. 11. It is adjacent to Parkland County on the east shore of Lake Wabamun and is home to the Paul First Nation. The Summer Village of Kapasiwin, the Wabamun 133B Indian reserve, and the Hamlet of Duffield are adjacent to Wabamun 133A to the northwest, north, and east respectively.

== Demographics ==
In 2006, Wabamun 133A had a population of 1,088 living in 207 dwellings, a 9.0% increase from 2001. The Indian reserve has a land area of 62.54 km^{2} (24.15 sq mi) and a population density of 17.4/km^{2} (45/sq mi).

== See also ==
- List of communities in Alberta
- List of Indian reserves in Alberta
