= Liberal Party of Canada candidates in the 1993 Canadian federal election =

The Liberal Party of Canada fielded a full slate of 295 candidates in the 1993 Canadian federal election, and won 177 seats to form a majority government. Many of the party's candidates have their own biography pages; information about others may be found here.

== Alberta ==
=== Bill Richards (Calgary Southwest) ===
Richards was born in Manitoba, and trained as a lawyer. He joined Dome Petroleum Ltd. in 1957, and eventually became its president. The company experienced record profits in the 1970s, and was Canada's largest petroleum firm by 1982. Subsequent debts threatened its viability, and the company required a bailout from Pierre Trudeau's federal government to remain solvent. Richards left the company in 1983, and later become president of the Canadian International Centre of Commerce, turning his attention to investment in apartment buildings and shopping malls. He remained a member of the Petroleum Club and the Ranchmen's Club, and continued to do consulting work in oil industry.

Richards' wife, Cathy Richards, was elected as president of the Liberal Party's Alberta wing in 1989. Richards purchased a Liberal Party membership card during this period, and became a prominent fundraiser in Jean Chrétien's bid for the party leadership in 1990. He was 67 years old when he campaigned for the Liberal Party in 1993, and described himself as being on the right wing of the party. He received 11,087 votes (17.36%), finishing third against Reform Party leader Preston Manning.

He was later appointed as Alberta's honorary counsel for Bangladesh, and was extensively involved in Asian investment. He also served as president and CEO of Comprehensive Medical Intelligence Inc., which he made public on the Stock Exchange in 1998. He has also remained active in the Liberal Party, and attended a campaign dinner for federal leadership candidate Paul Martin in 2003.

=== Karen Gainer (Calgary West) ===
Gainer is a lawyer, and is from a family with strong connections to the Liberal Party (Edmonton Journal, 25 May 1996). She practised criminal law from 1981 to 1996, and participated in several high-profile trials in Alberta. Active in aboriginal issues, she was the defence lawyer for activist Milton Born With A Tooth between 1990 and 1994 (Calgary Herald, 11 March 1994).

Gainer was named to the Calgary Health Services Board in 1987, and was chosen as its chair in 1989 (Calgary Herald, 28 October 1989). In early 1990, she led the board to boycott a major AIDS conference in America to protest against travel restrictions against people with AIDS in that country (CH, 20 April 1990). Gainer remained chair of the board for six years.

She first campaigned for the Liberal Party in the 1984 federal election, and later supported Jean Chrétien for the Liberal Party leadership in 1990 (Calgary Herald, 10 July 1989). She won the Calgary West Liberal nomination for the 1993 election on November 24, 1992, defeating 1988 candidate John Phillips by 182 votes to 158. Gainer supported official recognition for same-sex marriages during the 1993 campaign, several years before the issue became prominent in Canadian politics (CH, 6 October 1993). She finished second against Reform Party candidate Stephen Harper, and was later appointed to the National Forum on Health.

In 1996, Gainer was appointed by the National Democratic Institution for International Affairs to undertake a two-year mission in Croatia, assisting members of the country's six political parties in establishing a functional democratic system. A newspaper report listed her as thirty-nine years old at the time (Calgary Herald, 29 August 1996). She remained active with the NDI in Croatia after her initial assignment ended, and is still its resident senior country director for the country as of 2006.

Gainer called on Croatian president Franjo Tuđman to recognize the country's independent election monitoring group in 1997 (CH, 19 June 1997). During the 2000 Croatian presidential election, she compared frontrunner Stipe Mesić with Jean Chrétien in an interview with a Canadian newspaper (National Post, 24 January 2000).

Electoral record
Election	Division	Party	Votes	%	Place	Winner
1984 federal	Calgary Centre	Liberal	5,955	15.85	2/6	Harvie Andre, Progressive Conservative
1993 federal	Calgary West	Liberal	15,314	26.49	2/8	Stephen Harper, Reform

=== Chris Peirce (Edmonton—Strathcona) ===
Peirce was defeated by Reform Party candidate Hugh Hanrahan by 418 votes.
