= Canadian Hydro Developers =

Canadian energy company

Canadian Hydro Developers, Inc.
- Type: Public
- Industry: Electricity generation
- Defunct: 2009
- Fate: Acquired by TransAlta
- Headquarters: Calgary, Alberta, Canada
- Key people: Kent Brown, Chief Executive Officer
- Products: Electricity
- Revenue: ▲63 million USD (2007)
- Net income: ▼8 million USD (2007)
- Number of employees: 150 (2009)
- Website: www.canhydro.com

Canadian Hydro Developers, Inc. was a Canadian company that operated 12 hydroelectric power sites, eight wind power sites and one biomass power site in Canada.

Canadian Hydro was founded by two brothers John and Ross Keating with Jack McCleary. In 1989 Canadian Hydro had secured $1.3 million in equity and a contract with TransAlta to build three small run-of-river facilities. Revenue from these plants were then used in part to finance the future plants.

In January 2005, the firm bought Canadian Renewable Energy Corporation (CREC).

In December 2006 the firm bought Vector Wind Energy which has over 13 projects either built or in the process as of 2007.

Announced in February 2007 (and finalized in March) the firm bought GW Power Corporation.

In December 2009 TransAlta acquired Canadian Hydro Developers at $5.25 cash per share.

== Generating facilities ==
All facilities are owned by Canadian Hydro Developers.

| Name | Location | Fuel | Units net capacity (Date) | Capacity (net MW) | Link |
|---|---|---|---|---|---|
| Akolkolex | Revelstoke, British Columbia | Hydro | (1995) | | |
| Appleton | Appleton, Ontario | Hydro | Run-of-river (1994) | | |
| Belly River | Glenwood, Alberta | Hydro | Run-of-river (1991) | | |
| Cowley North | Pincher Creek, Alberta | Wind power | 15 Nordex N60 1.3 MW turbines (2001) | 19.5 MW | |
| Cowley Ridge | Pincher Creek, Alberta | Wind power | 52 Kenetech 33M-VS (360 kW) (1999); 5 Kenetech 33M-VS (375 kW) (2000) | 21.4 MW | |
| Galetta | Galetta, Ontario | Hydro | (1907) | | |
| Grande Prairie | Grande Prairie, Alberta | Biomass | (2003) | 25 MW | |
| Melancthon I | Shelburne, Ontario | Wind power | 45 GE 1.5 MW wind turbines (2006) | 67.5 MW | |
| Melancthon II | Shelburne, Ontario | Wind power | 88 GE 1.5 MW turbines (October 30, 2008) | 132 MW | |
| Misema | Cobalt, Ontario | Hydro | 2.3 MW (2003) | | |
| Moose Rapids | Sudbury, Ontario | Hydro | Run-of-river (1997) | | |
| Pingston | Revelstoke, British Columbia | Hydro | Two turbines (2003); One turbine (2004) | 45MW | |
| Ragged Chute | Cobalt, Ontario | Hydro | Run-of-river (1991) | | |
| Sinnott Wind Plant | Pincher Creek, Alberta | Wind power | 5 Nordex N60 1.3 MW turbines (2001) | 6.5 MW | |
| St. Mary | St. Mary, Alberta | Hydro | Run-of-river | | |
| Taylor | Magrath, Alberta | Hydro | Run-of-river | | |
| Taylor Wind Plant | Magrath, Alberta | Wind power | 9 Kennetech 375 kW turbines (2004) | 3.4 MW | |
| Upper Mamquam | Squamish, British Columbia | Hydro | operational in 2005 | 25 MW | |
| Wolfe Island Wind Project | Wolfe Island, Ontario | Wind power | 86 Siemens 2.3 MW turbines (2005) | 197.8 MW | |
| Waterton | Waterton, Alberta | Hydro | Run-of-river (1992) | | |
| Soderglen | Soderglen, Alberta | Wind power | 47x GE 1.5 MW; (From GWP Merger - Feb/Mar 2007) | 70.5 MW | |
