= Wabamun 133B =

- Indian reserve
- Location of Wabamun 133B in Alberta Wabamun 133B (Canada)
- Coordinates: 53°33′N 114°26′W
- Country: Canada
- Province: Alberta
- Region: Edmonton Metropolitan Region
- Census division: 11

Government
  - Chief: Daniel Paul
  - Governing body: Paul First Nation

Area
  - Land: 1.94 km^{2} (0.75 sq mi)

Population (2006)
  - Total: 20
  - Density: 10.3/km^{2} (27/sq mi)
- Time zone: UTC−06:00 (Alberta Time)
- Area codes: 780, 587, 825, 368

Wabamun 133B is a First Nations reserve in central Alberta, Canada, in Division No. 11. It is adjacent to Parkland County near the east shore of Lake Wabamun and is part of the Paul First Nation. The Summer Village of Kapasiwin and the Wabamun 133A Indian reserve are adjacent to Wabamun 133B to the west and south respectively.

== Demographics ==
In 2006, Wabamun 133B had a population of 20 people living in 5 dwellings. The Indian reserve has a land area of 1.94 km^{2} (0.75 sq mi) and a population density of 10.3/km^{2} (27/sq mi).

== See also ==
- List of communities in Alberta
- List of Indian reserves in Alberta
