= Buck Lake 133C =

Coordinates: 52°53′15″N 114°40′42″W

- Indian reserve
- Buck Lake Indian Reserve No. 133C
- Location in Alberta
- First Nation: Paul
- Treaty: 6
- Country: Canada
- Province: Alberta
- Municipal district: Wetaskiwin

Area
  - Total: 1,035.2 ha (2,558 acres)
- Time zone: UTC−06:00 (Alberta Time)

Buck Lake 133C is an Indian reserve of the Paul First Nation in Alberta, located within the County of Wetaskiwin No. 10. It is 87 kilometres west of Wetaskiwin.
