= Fort Saskatchewan Cogeneration Plant =

- Country: Canada
- Location: Fort Saskatchewan, Alberta
- Status: Operational
- Commission date: 1999
- Owners: TransAlta, Strongwater Energy LTD.

Thermal power station
- Primary fuel: Natural gas
- Turbine technology: Gas turbine
- Cogeneration?: Yes

Power generation
- Nameplate capacity: 118 MW

The Fort Saskatchewan Cogeneration Plant is on the Dow Chemical Canada's Fort Saskatchewan facility. The cogeneration plant produces 118 MW of electricity from its gas turbines and 100 tonnes per of steam for use in Dow Chemical Canada's facility.
