= Keephills Generating Station =

Coal-fired power station in Parkland County, Alberta

- Country: Canada
- Location: Parkland County, near Keephills, Alberta
- Coordinates: 53°26′54″N 114°27′02″W
- Status: Operational
- Commission date: 1983
- Owners: TransAlta & Capital Power

Thermal power station
- Primary fuel: Formerly coal, converted to gas in 2021
- Turbine technology: Steam turbine

Power generation
- Nameplate capacity: 800 MW

Keephills Generating Station is a natural gas power station operated by TransAlta, located near Keephills, Alberta, Canada. Unit 3 is a low emission station, which replaced the older Wabamun 4 station.

== Description ==
The station consists of the following units:

- Unit 2 is a 420 MW unit operated and owned by TransAlta.
- Unit 3 is a 463 MW unit, built as a joint venture between TransAlta and Capital Power Corporation. It came onstream in 2011. In 2019, TransAlta acquired full ownership of the unit. This unit is a supercritical boiler manufactured by Hitachi. The unit cost about $1.98 billion to build.

Unit 1 was retired on December 31, 2021.

The plant has two 138.6 m (455 ft) smokestacks.

== See also ==
- List of power stations in Canada
- List of largest power stations in Canada
- List of tallest structures in Canada
