= Keephills =

- Hamlet
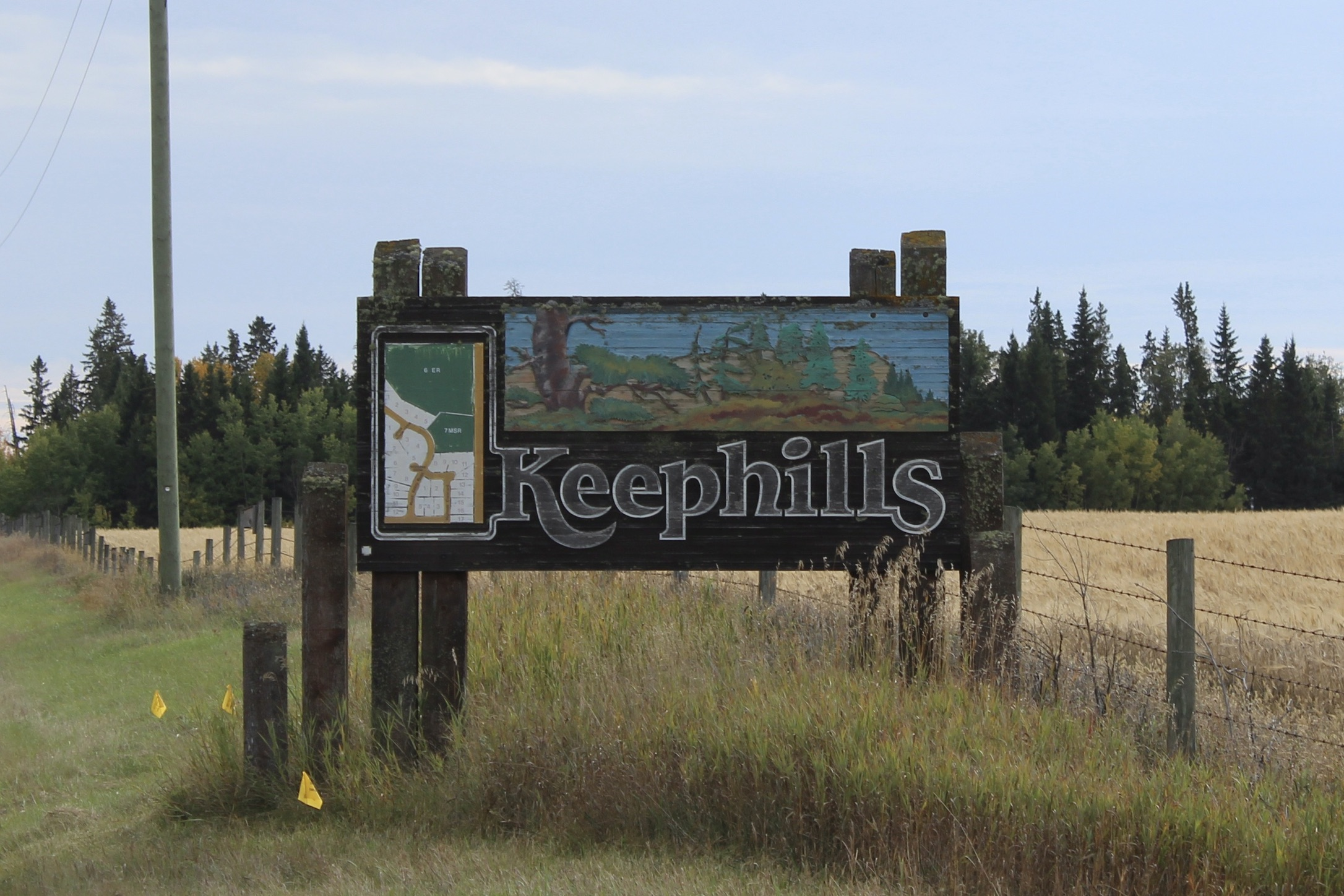
- Keephills welcome sign

- Location of Keephills Keephills (Canada)
- Coordinates: 53°26′30″N 114°20′58″W
- Country: Canada
- Province: Alberta
- Region: Edmonton Metropolitan Region
- Census division: 11
- Municipal district: Parkland County

Government
  - Type: Unincorporated
  - Governing body: Parkland County Council

Area (2021)
  - Land: 0.34 km^{2} (0.13 sq mi)

Population (2021)
  - Total: 57
  - Density: 169.8/km^{2} (440/sq mi)
- Time zone: UTC−06:00 (Alberta Time)
- Area codes: 780, 587, 825

Keephills is a hamlet in central Alberta, Canada within Parkland County. It is located approximately 19 kilometres (12 mi) south of Highway 16 and 64 kilometres (40 mi) southwest of Edmonton. A nearby employer is the Keephills Generating Station.

== Demographics ==
In the 2021 Census of Population conducted by Statistics Canada, Keephills had a population of 57 living in 20 of its 20 total private dwellings, a change of 18.8% from its 2016 population of 48. With a land area of 0.34 km^{2} (0.13 sq mi), it had a population density of 167.6/km^{2} (434.2/sq mi) in 2021.

As a designated place in the 2016 Census of Population conducted by Statistics Canada, Keephills had a population of 48 living in 18 of its 19 total private dwellings, a change of −7.7% from its 2011 population of 52. With a land area of 0.34 km^{2} (0.13 sq mi), it had a population density of 141.2/km^{2} (365.6/sq mi) in 2016.

== See also ==
- List of communities in Alberta
- List of hamlets in Alberta
