= Battle River Generating Station =

- Country: Canada
- Location: Battle River, County of Paintearth No. 18, Alberta
- Coordinates: 52°28′08″N 112°08′02″W
- Status: Operational
- Commission date: Unit 1: 1954; Unit 2: 1954; Unit 3: 1968-1969; Unit 4: 1973; Unit 5: 1980
- Owners: Previous: ATCO Power, Current: Heartland Generation

Thermal power station
- Primary fuel: Natural gas (100%)

Power generation
- Units operational: Unit 4: 155 MW; Unit 5: 385 MW
- Units decommissioned: Unit 1: 32 MW; Unit 2: 32 MW; Unit 3: 149 MW
- Nameplate capacity: 540 MW

Battle River Generating Station is a natural gas-fired power station owned by Heartland Generation. It is located near Forestburg, Alberta, Canada. Formerly a coal-fired power station, it transitioned away from coal in 2021. Natural gas is supplied by the Pembina Keephills Transmission pipeline. The plant features two large smokestacks, 161 m (528 ft) and 137 m (450 ft) tall.

== History ==
Units 1 and 2 were 32 MW coal-fired generating units that operated from 1954 until their retirement in 2000. Unit 3, supplied by Combustion Engineering, was a 149 MW coal-fired unit, commissioned in late 1968 and early 1969, and retired on December 31, 2019. Coal was provided by the Forestburg Collieries operated by Westmoreland Coal.

Unit 4 is a 155 MW unit that initially operated using 50% coal and 50% natural gas. It stopped using coal and switched entirely to using natural gas in 2021. Unit 5 is a 385 MW gas-fired steam unit.

== See also ==
- List of power stations in Canada
- List of generating stations in Alberta
- Coal in Canada
- Natural gas in Canada
