= Oldman River Dam =

Coordinates: 49.5642°N 113.9049°W

The Oldman River Dam is a dam on the Oldman River in southwestern Alberta, Canada. The dam is north of Pincher Creek in the Municipal District of Pincher Creek No. 9.

== Controversy ==
The Oldman River Dam was completed in 1991. The project had been opposed by some members of the Piikani Nation, led by Milton Born With A Tooth, who argued that the Piikani owned the rights to the water in the river and that the dam would result in the flooding of sacred Piikani land, (their burial ground). In 1990, Born With A Tooth attempted to use an excavator to divert the river away from the Lethbridge Northern Irrigation District canal intake. When the Royal Canadian Mounted Police arrived, Born With A Tooth fired his rifle twice. Ultimately, he was convicted of assault and several other offences and spent four and a half years in prison.

The dam was the subject of a number of legal challenges in the 1980s and 1990s.

== Power production and recreation area ==
Since 2003, ATCO has operated the Oldman River Hydroelectric Plant at the dam. The plant is capable of producing 32 megawatts of electrical power; the average annual generation is approximately 114 gigawatt-hours per year. The plant is 25 percent owned by the Piikani Nation. The Oldman River in southwestern Alberta provides 30 per cent of the water flow for the South Saskatchewan River Basin.

The reservoir created by the dam and the surrounding area constitutes the Oldman Dam Provincial Recreation Area.
