= Milton Born With A Tooth =

Canadian activist (1957–2019)

Milton Lawrence Born With A Tooth (June 9, 1957 – May 18, 2019, in Brocket, Alberta) was a Canadian political activist for First Nations rights.

Born With A Tooth first came to widespread notoriety in 1990, when the Alberta government sought to dam the Oldman River, which would have flooded Peigan burial grounds. Born With A Tooth led the Blackfoot Warrior Society in opposing the Oldman River Dam (Alberta). In 1990, Born With A Tooth used an excavator in an attempt to divert the river away from the dam.

On September 7 of that year, a group government representatives accompanied by armed Royal Canadian Mounted Police officers arrived to assess the damage caused by the attempted diversion. At trial, he was found to have confronted the group with a loaded rifle and had fired at least two shots in the air after having pointed the rifle at the back of a retreating RCMP officer. Following the incident, Born With A Tooth was arrested and charged with several violations of the Criminal Code, including dangerous possession of a rifle, endangerment, and obstruction. He was convicted and spent four and a half years in prison. He died on May 18, 2019, at the age of 61 in Calgary, Alberta.

Karen Gainer was the defence lawyer for Born With A Tooth between 1990 and 1994.
