= H. R. Milner Generating Station =

Canadian coal and gas power station

- Country: Canada
- Location: Municipal District of Greenview No. 16, near Grande Cache, Alberta
- Coordinates: 54.0073°N 119.1034°W
- Status: Operational
- Construction began: 1969
- Commission date: Unit 1: 1972; Unit 2: April 2020
- Construction cost: Unit 2: CAD$142 million
- Owner: Milner Power Inc.

Thermal power station
- Primary fuel: Natural gas (100% as of 2020)
- Turbine technology: Steam turbine Gas turbine
- Combined cycle?: Yes, 204MW GT and 96MW ST

Power generation
- Units operational: 1 x 96 MW, 1 x 204 MW
- Units planned: 1 x 300 MW (Unit 2 Uprating)
- Nameplate capacity: 300 MW

H. R. Milner Generating Station is a coal and natural gas-fired power station owned by Maxim Power, located near Grande Cache, Alberta, Canada. H.R. Milner underwent a conversion to natural gas in 2020, and the old Milner 1 is now supplied by steam from the new adjacent Milner 2.

== Description ==
H.R. Milner's was first commissioned in 1972 as a coal-fired power station consisting of a single 150 MW unit fuelled by sub-bituminous coal from a nearby coal mine. The plant was constructed and initially owned by Canadian Utilities, then owned by ATCO Power from 2000 to 2004. The plant is named after H. R. Milner a former executive with Canadian Utilities.

In March 2016, the station was temporarily shutdown by Maxim Power due to low demand. The station was temporarily shutdown again in April 2018 due to constrained fuel supplies.

=== Conversion to natural gas ===
In 2011, the Alberta Utilities Commission approved the construction of a new 500 MW Supercritical Unit. This was considered controversial as the approval was given just in time to allow construction to be completed before new federal regulations (essentially preventing new coal plant construction) were put into place. In the wake of new federal regulations governing greenhouse gas emissions introduced in 2012, Maxim Power applied to change the new unit from one 500 MW coal-fired generator, to two 260 MW natural gas fired generators. This application was approved by the Alberta Utilities Commission in June 2014.

On 31 December 2019, Unit 1 was converted to running off 50% sub-bituminous coal and 50% natural gas, running off the fuel mixture at 9% capacity. Unit 2, a 204 MW simple-cycle natural gas-fired unit, is due to be commissioned in April 2020. This will change the power station's overall fuel mixture to 79% natural gas and 21% sub-bituminous coal.

== See also ==
- Coal in Canada
- Natural gas in Canada
