= Maxim Power =

Maxim Power Corporation
- Company type: Public
- Traded as: TSX: MXG
- Industry: Power Generation
- Founded: July 9, 1993
- Headquarters: Calgary, Canada
- Area served: Alberta
- Key people: Robert Emmott (President & CEO); Kyle Mitton (Chief Financial Officer & Vice President, Corporate Development)
- Products: Electricity
- Subsidiaries: Milner Power Inc, Milner Power II Inc, Summit Coal Inc
- Website: http://www.maximpowercorp.com

Maxim Power Corp. is an independent power generating company based in Calgary. The company is focused entirely on power projects in Alberta. Its core asset, the 300 MW H. R. Milner Plant ("M2") in Grande Cache, AB is a combined cycle gas-fired power plant that commissioned in Q4, 2023. MAXIM continues to explore additional development options in Alberta including its currently permitted gas-fired generation projects and the permitting of its wind power generation project. It was founded on July 9, 1993.

The company's wholly owned subsidiary, Summit Coal, has coal leases in the province of Alberta.

== Generating facilities ==
Maxim Generating stations are either owner directly by Maxim Power or through subsidiaries.

=== Canadian facilities ===
Name	Location	Fuel	Capacity (net MW)	Link
H. R. Milner Plant ("M2")	Grande Cache, Alberta	Natural Gas	300 MW	
Gold Creek Generating Facility	Near Grande Prairie	Heat Recovery	6.5 MW	
