= Oldman River Hydroelectric Plant =

- Country: Canada
- Location: Municipal District of Pincher Creek No. 9, near Pincher Creek, Alberta
- Coordinates: 49°33′39″N 113°53′45″W
- Status: Operational
- Commission date: 2003
- Construction cost: $34 million
- Owners: Atco Power; Piikani Nation

Thermal power station
- Primary fuel: Hydro

Power generation
- Nameplate capacity: 32 MW

Oldman River Hydroelectric Plant is a run-of-river hydroelectric power station owned by Atco Power (75%) and Piikani Nation (25%). The plant is located on the Oldman River near Pincher Creek, Alberta, Canada. The plant is primarily used to supply power onto the Alberta grid.

== Description ==
The plant consists of:

- Two horizontal axis Francis turbines, (VA Tech Bouvier Canada with GE generators).

== See also ==
- Oldman River Dam
