= Poplar Hill Generating Plant =

- Country: Canada
- Location: County of Grande Prairie No. 1, near Grande Prairie, Alberta
- Coordinates: 55°20′20″N 119°13′07″W
- Status: Operational
- Commission date: 1998
- Owner: Dynasty Power Generation

Thermal power station
- Primary fuel: Natural gas

Power generation
- Units operational: 1
- Make and model: GE LM6000
- Nameplate capacity: 45 MW

Poplar Hill Generating Plant is a natural gas power station owned by Dynasty Power Generation. The plant is located about 30 km northwest of Grande Prairie, Alberta, Canada. The plant operates in one of two modes as a synchronous condenser that allows the plant's generator to be disconnected from the turbine to provide voltage support or as a conventional power plant when additional power is needed in the region.

== Description ==
The plant consists of:

- One GE LM6000 gas turbine and generator
