= Genalta Power =

Genalta Power is an independent power producer based in Calgary, Alberta.

== History ==
The company was founded in 2008 and specializes in distributed generation facilities ranging from 2–50 megawatts. The company builds, owns, operates and maintains power plants that utilize wasted or under utilized energy resources.

The company has undergone several rounds of financing with strategic financial partners to build over 66 MW of power producing assets, and in October 2020 allied with Capstone Infrastructure to enable Genalta to continue to develop carbon-neutral distributed generation facilities throughout Alberta and Saskatchewan.

The company was the first company in Alberta to earn carbon credits by converting flare gas to electricity.
