= Wabamun Generating Station =

- Location of Wabamun Generating Station
- Country: Canada
- Location: Wabamun, Alberta
- Coordinates: 53°33′30″N 114°29′17″W
- Status: Decommissioned
- Commission date: 1956
- Decommission date: 2010
- Owner: TransAlta

Thermal power station
- Primary fuel: Subbituminous coal

Power generation
- Units operational: 2 X 66 MW; 1 X 159 MW; 1 X 279 MW
- Make and model: AEI; Metropolitan-Vickers
- Nameplate capacity: 582 MW

Wabamun Generating Station was a coal-fired power station owned by TransAlta, located next to the village of Wabamun, Alberta. The station's primary source of fuel was sub bituminous from the Whitewood mine. Unit 3 was retired in 2002; Units 1 and 2 on December 31, 2004, and Unit 4 on March 31, 2010. On August 11, 2011, the main building was levelled by a controlled implosion. Plans for the site include high rise condos and a waterfront.

== Description ==
The plant consisted of:

- Unit 1 from Babcock & Wilcox at 66 MW (commissioned in 1958, decommissioned in 2004)
- Unit 2 from Babcock & Wilcox at 66 MW (commissioned in 1956, decommissioned in 2004)
- Unit 3 from Combustion Engineering at 150 (commissioned in 1962, decommissioned in 2002)
- Unit 4 from Combustion Engineering at 300 (commissioned in 1968, decommissioned in 2010)

Decommissioned in 2010 with the smoke stacks demolished in March 2011.
