= TransAlta =

Canadian electricity generation company

TransAlta Corporation

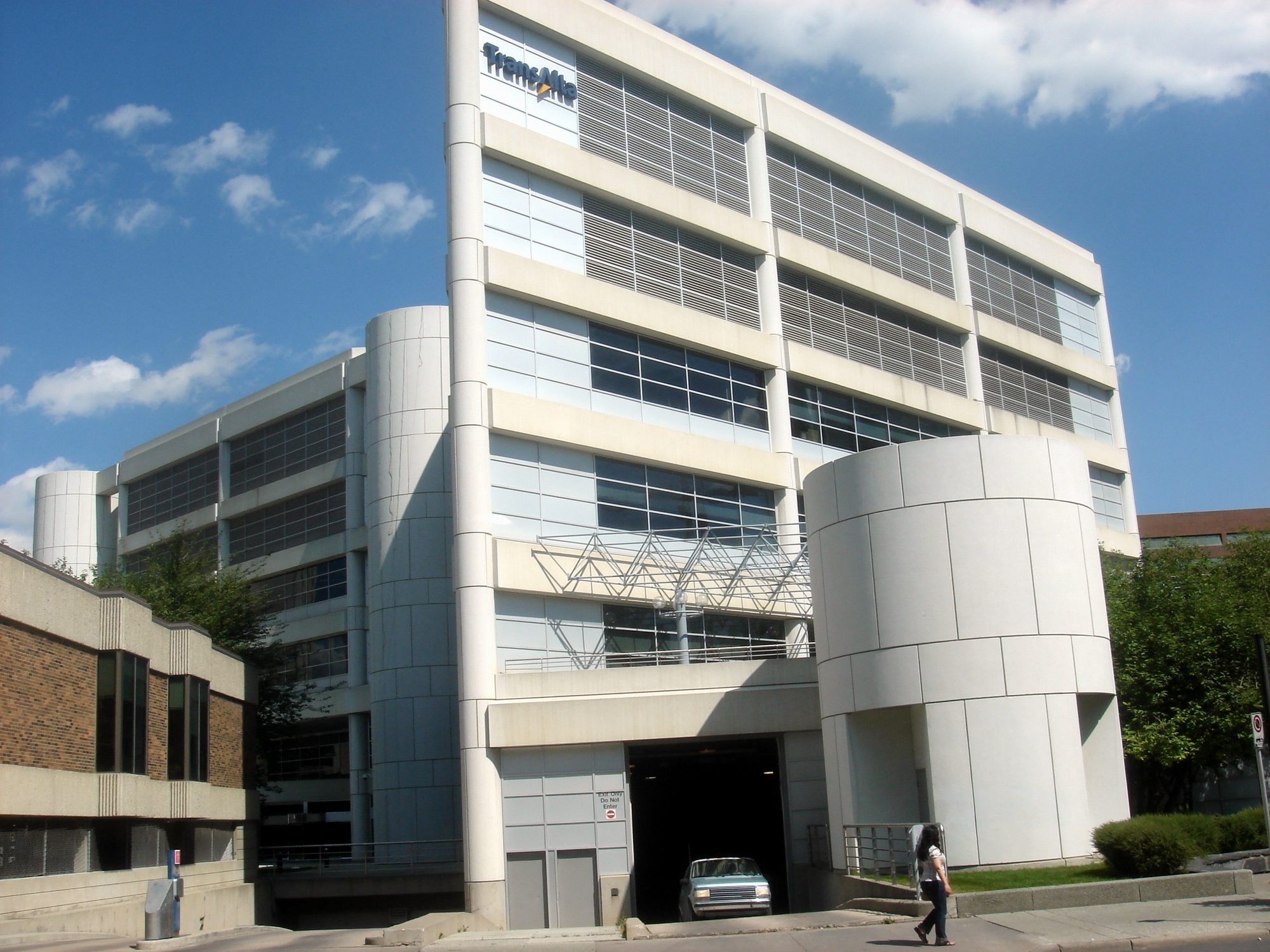
- Headquarters in Calgary
- Type: Public
- Traded as: TSX: TA; NYSE: TAC
- Industry: Power generation
- Founded: 1911
- Headquarters: Calgary, Alberta, Canada
- Key people: John Kousinioris (President and CEO), John P. Dielwart (Board Chair) Appt’d April 21, 2020
- Products: Power Generation (8,128 MW aggregate generating capacity).
- Revenue: ▼CA$2.40 billion (2025)
- Net income: ▼CA$−138 million (2025)
- Total assets: CA$9.7 billion (2020)
- Number of employees: 1,476 (Dec. 31, 2020)
- Website: www.transalta.com

TransAlta Corporation (formerly Calgary Power Company, Ltd.) is an electricity power generator and wholesale marketing company headquartered in Calgary, Alberta, Canada. It is a privately owned corporation and its shares are traded publicly. It operates 76 power plants in Canada, the United States, and Australia. TransAlta operates wind, hydro, natural gas, and coal power generation facilities. The company has been recognized for its leadership in sustainability by the Dow Jones Sustainability North America Index, the FTSE4Good Index, and the Jantzi Social Index. TransAlta is Canada's largest investor-owned renewable energy provider.

TransAlta operated Canada's largest surface strip coal mine from 1970 until 2021 through its subsidiary company Sunhills Mining. The 12,600-hectare mine produced 13 million tonnes of thermal grade coal a year. The company announced that it would decommission the Highvale mine by 2021.

On November 2, 2023, it was announced that TransAlta bought Heartland Generation (the third largest electricity generation company in Alberta at the time) for $658 million. The purchase means that TransAlta now controls 46% of the electricity generation market in Alberta - a development that has been criticized by numerous academics and industry officials as "a catastrophe" and likely to lead to economic withholding.

== History ==
In 1909, TransAlta began the planning and construction of the Horseshoe Falls Hydro Plant in Seebe, Alberta. Two years later, Calgary Power Company, Ltd. was established.

That first dam was built by a crew of about 200 with primitive tools such as picks and wheelbarrows. It initially had a 10 MW capacity (13,500 horsepower). A second dam was commissioned in 1913 at Kananaskis Falls and was built by close to 500 workers.

At the time, streetcars were responsible for a significant share of Calgary's electrical load. Residential power was just being introduced, and many homes were lit for the first time with electrical lamps because of Calgary Power. Calgary Power's cheap energy is credited with Canadian Pacific Railway's decision to locate its regional engine repair shop in Ogden, Calgary, spurring the city's economic development.

Notable leaders from the company's early years included W. Max Aitken (later known as Lord Beaverbrook) and R.B. Bennett, who went on to become Canada's Prime Minister from 1930 to 1935.

The company's monopoly position and behaviour made its status as a private corporation unpopular among rural customers and some Calgary residents, and a move to nationalize it was converted to a province-wide referendum in 1948, which came down very narrowly on the side of maintaining its private ownership.

In 1981, the company changed its name to its current name of TransAlta Corporation.

At the end of 2010, TransAlta became the first company to own and operate more than 1,000 MW of installed wind capacity in Canada—almost 30 per cent of the country's total.

TransAlta has gradually been transitioning its energy-generating facilities away from coal, due to adverse environmental effects, towards natural gas. Its last remaining operational coal mine, in Highvale, AB, will cease mining operations on December 31, 2021, and transition to mine reclamation in the years to follow.

== Ghost Reservoir ==
Since the 2013 Alberta floods, as a temporary partial solution to mitigate flood damage during those months when there is a greater risk of rising water that might cause flooding, the Government of Alberta entered into an agreement with TransAlta to manage water on the Bow River at its Ghost Reservoir facility. This was extended in 2016 with a new five-year agreement that included water management of its Kananaskis Lakes system (which includes Interlakes, Pocaterra and Barrier) for drought mitigation.

== Controversies ==
On March 21, 2014, the Alberta Market Surveillance Administrator (MSA) filed an application with the Alberta Utilities Commission (AUC) alleging TransAlta manipulated the price of electricity when it took outages at its Alberta coal-fired generating units in late 2010 and early 2011. While TransAlta disputed the MSA's allegations, the AUC ruled TransAlta's actions in relation to four outage events spanning 11 days in 2010 and 2011 restricted or prevented a competitive response from the associated Power Purchase Agreement (PPA) buyers and manipulated market prices away from a competitive market outcome. On Sept. 30, 2015, TransAlta and the province's MSA reached an agreement to settle all outstanding proceedings before the AUC. The settlement, which is in the form of a consent order, was approved by the AUC on Oct. 29, 2015.

Under the terms of the agreement, TransAlta paid a total amount of (CDN) $56 million, including approximately $27 million as a repayment of economic benefit, approximately $4 million to cover the MSA's legal and related costs, and a $25 million administrative penalty. As part of the settlement agreement, TransAlta agreed to discontinue its court appeal of the AUC's decision concerning the four outage events.TransAlta's legal appeal came as a result of the AUC's determination in its ruling that the “MSA did not prove, on the balance of probabilities, that the company breached applicable legislation on the basis that its compliance policies, practices, and oversight thereof, were inadequate and deficient.”

In response to the dispute regarding its understanding of Alberta market rules governing forced outages, TransAlta implemented two independent, third-party reviews of its compliance procedures. The results of the reviews by McCarthy Tétrault and PwC were publicly released, including recommendations for improvement.

In 2015 the Alberta Utilities Commission ruled that TransAlta manipulated the price of electricity when it took outages at its Alberta coal-fired generating units in late 2010 and early 2011.

In 2016, it was revealed that TransAlta gave $54,000 to University of Alberta professor Warren Kindzierski to research the health impacts of coal-fired plants near Edmonton. The study concluded that 'the high number of coal-fired power plants near the city of Edmonton doesn't negatively impact the health of local residents,' and was used by TransAlta as 'scientific backing' to push for an alternative to Alberta's then-plan to phase out coal by 2030. Between 2013 and 2015, TransAlta provided an additional $175,000 to the University of Alberta in sponsorship agreements for research and academic projects. The incident was highlighted by members of the university's Corporate Mapping Project for exemplifying the deeper issue of undisclosed corporate funding and influence in academic research in Canada.

== Hydro facilities in British Columbia ==
Upper Mamquam, built by Canadian Hydro Developers and operational since 2005, is a run-of-the-river hydroelectric plant 5 km northeast of Squamish, BC. The penstock is 1.6 km long, dropping 120 meters to the powerhouse containing two 12.5 MW Pelton wheel generators.

Bone Creek a hydroelectric plant constructed in 2011, has a 5 km penstock dropping 148 meters to a powerhouse with two 9.6MW Francis turbines. It is located 90 km south of Valemount, BC and operated by Valisa Energy Inc. Approximately 72 GWh of power annually is sold to BC Hydro.

Akolkolex, built by Canadian Hydro Developers and operational since 1995, uses two Francis turbines in a 10 MW run-of-river hydroelectric plant discharging into Arrow Lakes. It is located 25 km SE of Revelstoke, B.C. The plant produces approximately 37 GWh of electricity annually.

Pingston Creek has a 12 meter high sheetpile rock-fill dam which diverts water to the western shore of Arrow Lakes. It was built by Canadian Hydro Developers and Brascan Power and began operation as Pingston Power Inc. in 2003. A 4 km tunnel achieves a huge drop of 557 meters to three 15 MW Pelton wheels to generate about 200 GWh annually. The project is 53 km south of Revelstoke, BC.

== Energy generation summary ==
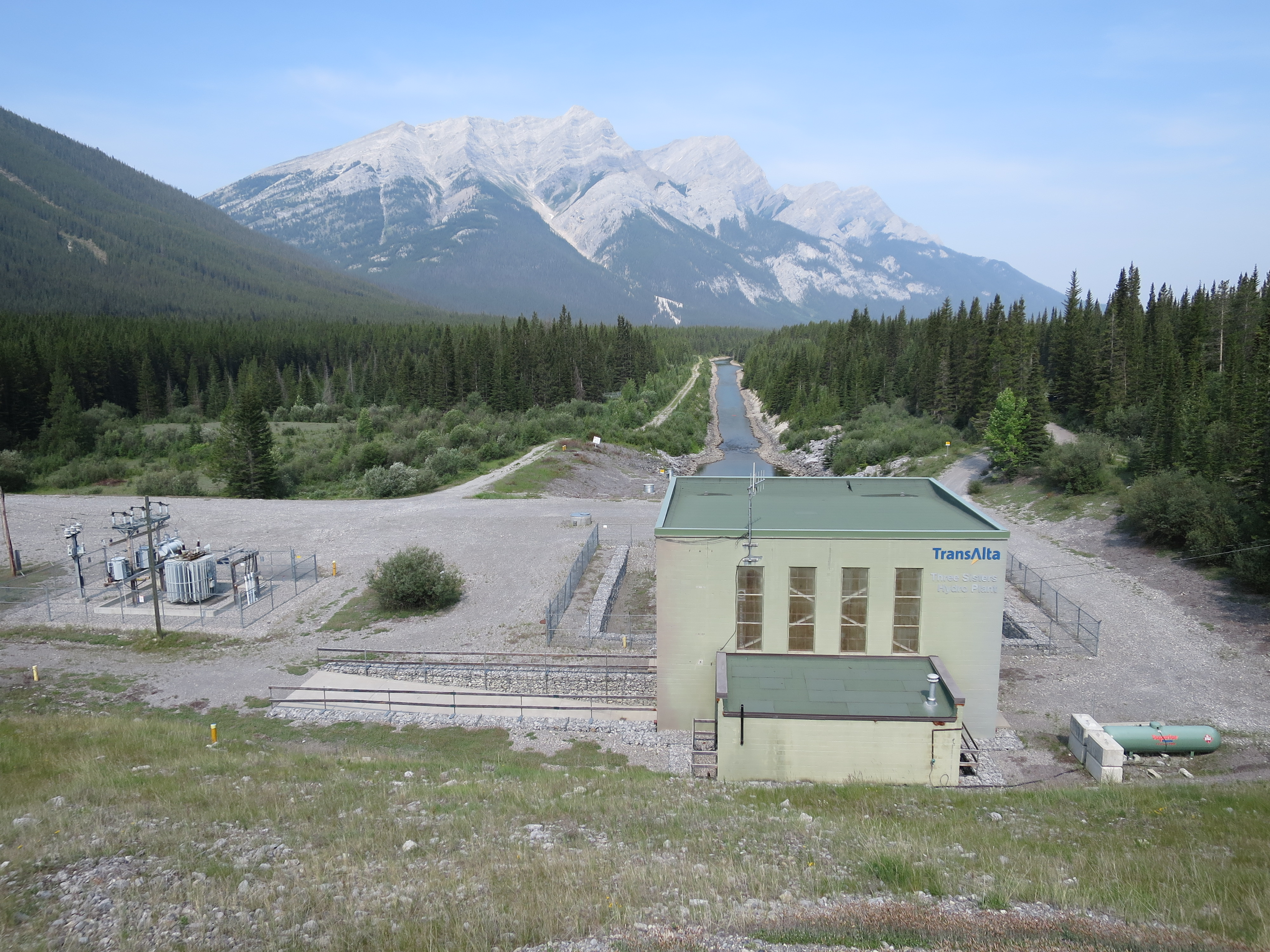
TransAlta hydroelectric plant at the Spray Lakes Reservoir, Kananaskis Country, Alberta

- 8,128 megawatts (MW) of aggregate generation capacity (2020).
- 24,980 gigawatt hours (GWh) were produced at an average plant availability of 90.3 per cent for the year ended December 31, 2020.
- 76 facilities in three geographies: Canada, U.S., Australia
- One surface coal mine in operation: Highvale in Alberta, Canada. Its operations will transition to 100 per cent mine reclamation effective Jan. 1, 2022.

Net Capacity Owned by Fuel Type
(in operation and in development 2021)

Type	Net Capacity
Coal	28%
Gas	35%
Wind/Solar	24%
Hydro	13%

Net Capacity Owned by Geography
(in operation and development)

Geography	Net Capacity
Canada	80%
United States	14%
Australia	6%

== Leadership ==
=== President ===
1. The Lord Beaverbrook, 1909
2. Sir Herbert Samuel Holt, 1910–1911
3. The Viscount Bennett, 1911–1921
4. Victor Montague Drury, 1921–1924
5. Izaak Walton Killam, 1924 – 18 October 1928
6. Geoffrey Abbott Gaherty, 18 October 1928 – May 1960
7. George Harry Thompson, May 1960 – 10 September 1965
8. Albert Warren Howard, 10 September 1965 – 17 May 1973
9. Marshall MacKenzie Williams, 17 May 1973 – May 1985
10. Kenneth Frank McCready, May 1985 – 28 January 1996
11. Walter Saponja (interim), 28 January 1996 – 1 September 1996
12. Stephen Gregory Snyder, 1 September 1996 – 31 December 2011
13. Dawn Lorraine Farrell, 1 January 2012 – 31 March 2021
14. John Harry Kousinioris, 1 April 2021 – 30 April 2026
15. Joel E. Hunter, 1 May 2026 – present

=== Chairman of the Board ===
1. Izaak Walton Killam, 18 October 1928 – 5 August 1955 †
2. Geoffrey Abbott Gaherty, May 1960 – 10 August 1964 †
3. George Harry Thompson, 10 September 1965 – 17 May 1973
4. Albert Warren Howard, 17 May 1973 – June 1984
5. Marshall MacKenzie Williams, June 1984 – 10 May 1991
6. Harry George Schaefer, 10 May 1991 – 8 May 1996
7. Richard Francis Haskayne, 8 May 1996 – 1998
8. John Thomas Ferguson, 1998–2005
9. Donna Soble Kaufman, 2005 – 28 April 2011
10. Gordon Davies Giffin, 28 April 2011 – 21 April 2020
11. John Patrick Dielwart, 21 April 2020 – present

† = died in office
