= List of Canadian electric utilities =

This is a list of the electric utilities in Canada.

== List of electric utilities by size ==
Rank	Company	Founded	Established	Type	Head office	Customers	Transmission (km)	Capacity (MW)	Generation (GWh)	Revenue ($M)	Ref
1.	Hydro-Québec		1944	Public, integrated	Quebec	4,316,914	34,361	37,310	230,795	14,370	(Note: Generation number includes power bought from third-party suppliers.)
2.	Hydro One	1906	1998	Public, Private, T & D	Ontario	1,333,920	28,924	—	—	4,744	
3.	Ontario Power Generation		1999	Provincial	Ontario	—	—	21,729	92,500	5,640	
4.	BC Hydro	1897	1961	Public, integrated	British Columbia	4,000,000	18,000	12,097	43,755	3,822	
5.	Alectra Utilities		2017	Municipal, integrated	Ontario	1,076,538	—	-	-	3,954	
6.	ENMAX	1905		Municipal, integrated	Alberta	836,000	299	1721	—	3,160.1	(Note: Electricity-related revenues only)
7.	TransAlta	1911		Investor-owned, generation	Alberta	—	—	8,775	45,736	2,770	
8.	Toronto Hydro	1911	1998	Municipal, T & D	Ontario	761,000	—	—	—	2,461.7	
9.	ATCO	1947		Private, integrated	Alberta	233,100		2,732		2,443.1	(Note: Sum of ATCO Utilities and ATCO Energy segments. Includes gas sales and other non-electricity sales.)
10.	Bruce Power		2001	Private, generation	Ontario	—	—	6,300	34,600	2,380	
11.	EPCOR		1996	Municipal, T & D	Alberta	334,000	203	—	—	2,008	(Note: Excluding Water services.)
12.	Capital Power Corporation	1891		Private, generation	Alberta	—	—	3,654	7,015	1,008	(Note: Six-month results in 2009.)
13.	Manitoba Hydro	1873	1961	Public, integrated	Manitoba	532,359	11,700	5,511	33,974	1,599	
14.	NB Power	1880	1920	Public, integrated	New Brunswick	335,513	6,801	3,297	14,418	1,712	(Note: 2008 figures. Most recent data available.)
15.	SaskPower		1929	Public, integrated	Saskatchewan	467,329	14,816	5,930	19,864	1,459	
16.	Nova Scotia Power	1919	1972	Private, integrated	Nova Scotia	486,000	5,000	2,293	12,092	1,188.1	
17.	Hydro Ottawa	1880	2000	Municipal, distribution	Ontario	296,000	—	14	150	754.5	
18.	Enova Power		2022	Municipal, T & D	Ontario	157,466	3,665	-	-	-	
19.	Newfoundland and Labrador Hydro		1954	Public, integrated	Newfoundland and Labrador	36,000	5,048	8,034	42,194	1,359	
20.	Saskatoon Light & Power	1906		Municipal, distribution	Saskatchewan	58,600	—	—	—	120.8	
21.	Cornwall Electric	1887	1905	Private, distribution	Ontario	23,800	---	---	---	---	---

== List of electric utilities by province or territory ==
This is a list of Canadian public and private electric utilities, by province.

=== Alberta ===
Electric Transmission:

- AltaLink

Investor Owned:

- FortisAlberta
- ATCO Electric

Municipals:

- City of Lethbridge Electric Utility
- ENMAX (formerly City of Calgary Electric System)
- EPCOR (formerly Edmonton Power Corporation)
- City of Medicine Hat Electric Utility
- Town of Ponoka
- City of Red Deer Electric Light and Power
- Town of Cardston

Rural Electrification Associations:

- Battle River Power Cooperative
- Beaver REA
- Blue Mountain Power Corp.
- Borradaile REA
- Braes REA
- Claysmore REA
- Devonia REA
- Drayton Valley REA
- Duffield REA
- EQUS
- Ermineskin REA
- Fenn REA
- Heart River REA
- Kneehill REA
- Lindale REA
- MaKenzie REA
- Mayerthorpe and District REA
- Niton REA
- North Parkland Power
- Sterling REA
- Stony Plain REA
- Tomahawk REA
- West Liberty REA
- Willingdon REA

Sold to FortisAlberta:

- Town of Fort Macleod
- Municipality of Crowsnest Pass

- TransAlta Corporation
- Direct Energy

=== British Columbia ===
- BC Hydro
- Columbia Power Corporation
- FortisBC

Municipals:

- Grand Forks Hydro
- Nelson Hydro
- New Westminster
- Penticton
- Summerland

=== Manitoba ===
- Manitoba Hydro

=== New Brunswick ===
- NB Power
- Saint John Energy

Municipals:

- Town of Perth Andover
- Energie Edmundston Energy

=== Newfoundland and Labrador ===
- Newfoundland and Labrador Hydro
  - Churchill Falls (Labrador) Corporation Limited
  - Lower Churchill Development Corporation Limited
- Newfoundland Power

=== Northwest Territories ===
- Northland Utilities
- Northwest Territories Power Corporation

=== Nova Scotia ===
- Nova Scotia Power
- Antigonish Electric Utility
- Berwick Electric Light Commission
- Canso Electric Light Commission
- Lunenburg Electric Utility
- Mahone Bay Electric Utility
- Riverport Electric Light Commission

=== Nunavut ===
- Qulliq Energy Corporation

=== Ontario ===
Ontario’s electricity distribution consists of multiple local distribution companies (LDCs). Hydro One, a publicly-traded company owned in part by the provincial government, is the largest LDC in the province and services approximately 26 percent of all electricity customers in Ontario.

The other local distribution companies in Ontario may be municipally owned corporations or privately-operated entities, and include:

- Alectra Utilities, serving: Aurora, Alliston, Barrie, Beeton, Bradford West Gwillimbury, Brampton, Guelph, Hamilton, Markham, Mississauga, Penetanguishene, Richmond Hill, Rockwood, St. Catharines, Thornton, Tottenham, and Vaughan
- Algoma Power, serving: Algoma
- Canadian Niagara Power, serving: Fort Erie and Port Colborne
- Cornwall Electric, serving : Cornwall, South Glengarry, South Stormont, Akwesasne
- Elexicon Energy, serving: Ajax, Pickering, Whitby, Belleville, Bowmanville, Gravenhurst, Uxbridge and Scugog
- Energy+, serving: Cambridge, North Dumfries, and Brant
- Enova Power, serving: Kitchener, Waterloo, Woolwich, Wilmot, and Wellesley
- EPCOR Utilities, serving: Collingwood, Stayner, Creemore, and Thornbury
- Festival Hydro, serving: Stratford, St. Mary's, Seaforth, Hensall, Brussels, Zurich and Dashwood
- Greater Sudbury Hydro, serving: Sudbury and West Nipissing
- Hydro Ottawa, serving: Ottawa and Casselman
- London Hydro
- Oakville Hydro
- Oshawa Power (company)
- PUC serving: Sault Ste. Marie
- Synergy North, serving: Kenora and Thunder Bay
- Toronto Hydro

=== Prince Edward Island ===
- Maritime Electric
- Summerside Electric

=== Quebec ===
- Boralex
- Cartier Wind Energy
- Hydro-Jonquière
- Hydro Magog
- Hydro-Québec
- Hydro-Sherbrooke
- Hydro Westmount
- Innergex Renewable Energy
- Rio Tinto Alcan

=== Saskatchewan ===
- SaskPower
- Saskatoon Light & Power
- Swift Current Light and Power

=== Yukon ===
- ATCO Electric Yukon
- Yukon Energy Corporation

== See also ==
- Electricity sector in Canada
- List of Canadian mobile phone companies
- List of Canadian telephone companies
- List of telephone operating companies
- List of public utilities
- ISO New England
- List of United States electric companies
- Electricity distribution companies by country
