= Alectra =

Canadian electric utility

Alectra Incorporated

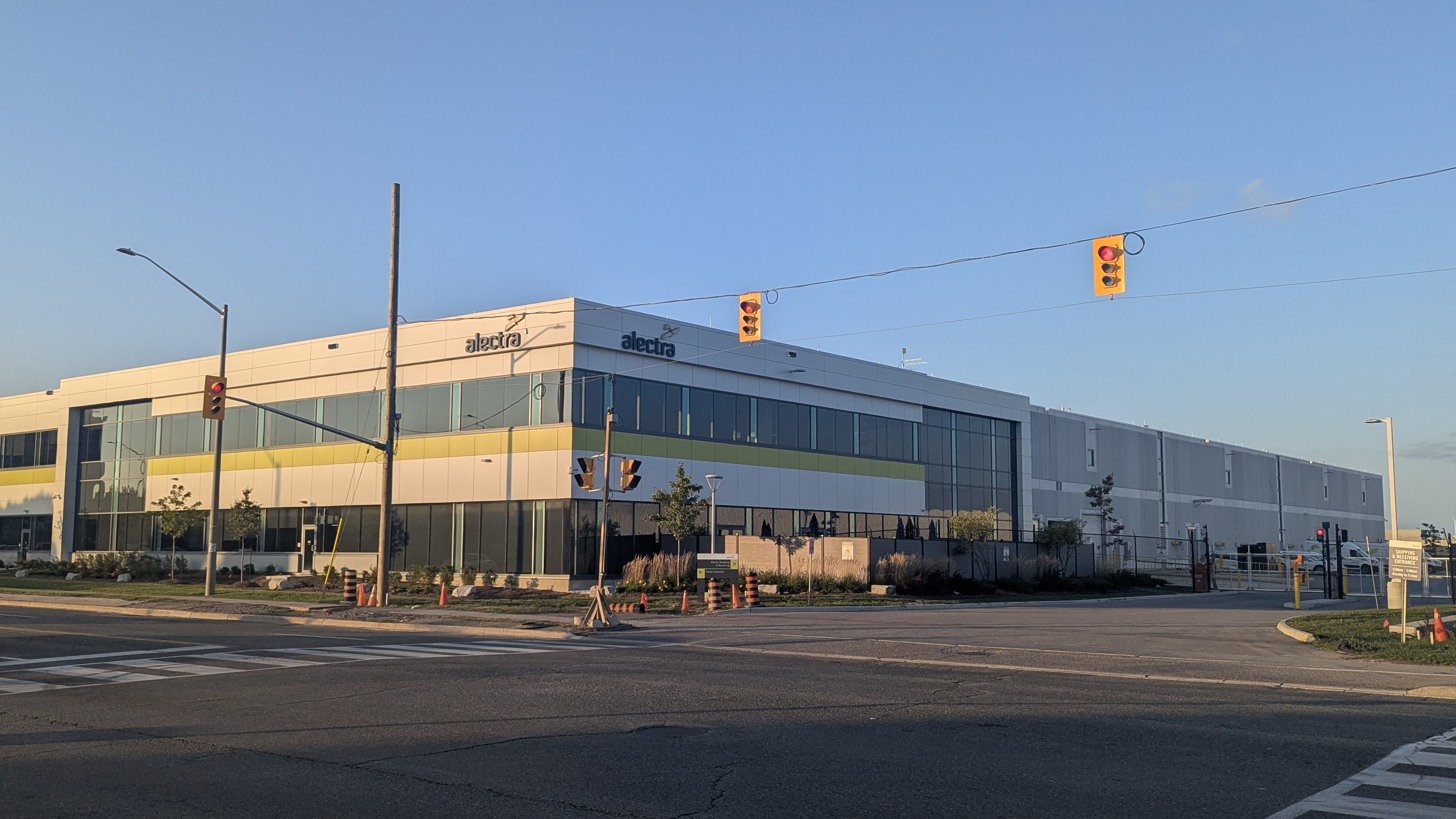
- Type: Municipally owned corporation
- Industry: Electricity distribution
- Predecessors: Enersource; Horizon Utilities; PowerStream; Hydro One Brampton; Guelph Hydro
- Founded: January 31, 2017; 9 years ago in Mississauga, Ontario
- Headquarters: Mississauga, Ontario
- Areas served: see below
- Key people: Brian Bentz (President and CEO)
- Owners: City of Mississauga (26.61%); City of Vaughan (20.50%); City of Hamilton (17.31%); City of Markham (15.00%); City of Barrie (8.37%); City of Guelph (4.63%); City of St. Catharines (4.63%); OMERS Infrastructure (Note: Held the remaining 10% of Enersource; formerly known as Borealis Infrastructure) (2.96%)
- Number of employees: 1,600 (2017, projected)
- Subsidiaries: Alectra Utilities Corporation; Alectra Energy Solutions Inc.
- Website: alectrautilities.com

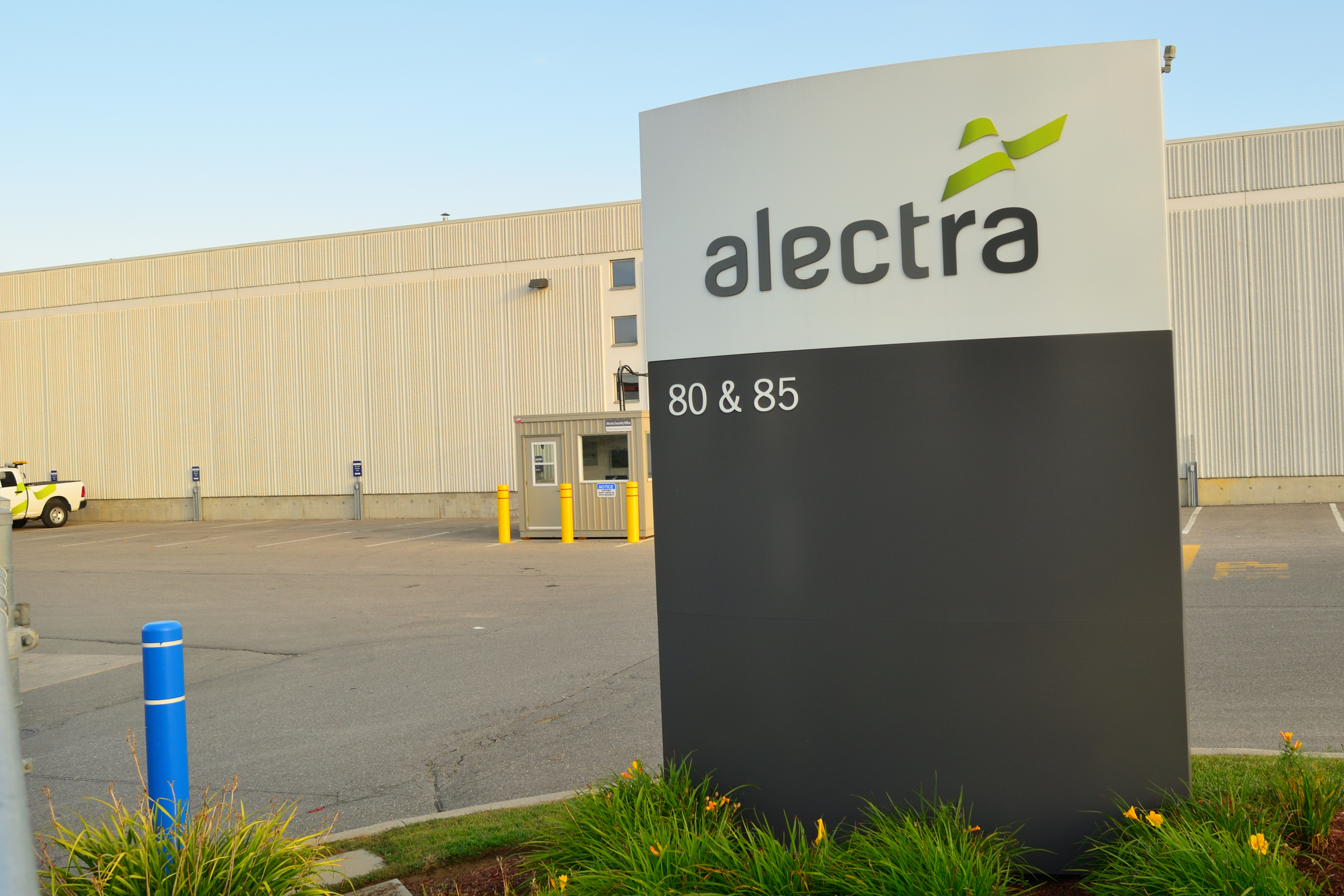
Alectra office in Markham

Alectra Incorporated, through its subsidiary Alectra Utilities Corporation, is an electricity utility and distributor that serves several municipalities in the Golden Horseshoe region of Ontario. It is a municipally-owned corporation with shares in varying amounts held by the municipalities which owned its predecessor companies.

When it was founded, Alectra was described as the second largest municipally owned electricity utility in North America after the Los Angeles Department of Water and Power. As of January 2019 it is the largest municipally owned electricity utility in Canada, by number of customers served.

== Formation and expansion ==
Alectra was formed on January 31, 2017 by the merger of the municipally owned utilities Enersource (servicing Mississauga), Horizon Utilities (servicing Hamilton and St. Catharines), and PowerStream (servicing multiple municipalities in York Region and Simcoe County, including the city of Barrie). The initial formation of the company was completed with the acquisition of Hydro One Brampton from the provincial government's Hydro One on February 28, 2017. Guelph Hydro (serving Guelph and Rockwood) merged into Alectra on January 1, 2019.

Following its formation, Alectra continued to hold the 50% ownership stake formerly held by PowerStream in Collus PowerStream (which services Collingwood and surrounding area) until 2017. Alectra announced on November 9, 2017 that it was selling its ownership stake in Collus PowerStream back to the Town of Collingwood, with the Town announcing that it was selling Collus PowerStream to EPCOR Utilities.

On January 5, 2021, Alectra acquired power restoration company Holland Power Services based in Maugerville, New Brunswick. Holland Power Services operates throughout the east coast of Canada and the United States and has 5 locations: 1 in New Brunswick (headquarters), 2 in Ontario, 1 in Quebec, and 1 in Maine, USA.

On June 10, 2024, Alectra announced their acquisition of another power restoration company, Gagnon Line Construction, based in Grand Falls/Grand Sault, New Brunswick. Gagnon Line Construction has two locations: 1 in New Brunswick, and 1 in Quebec. The acquisition of both Holland Power Services and Gagnon Line Construction makes Alectra the largest storm restoration company in Eastern Canada.

== Corporate organization ==
The company is governed by a 14-member board of directors representing the municipalities and other shareholders which owned its predecessor companies. Municipal representatives make up 13 of those directors, consisting of: 4 directors from Mississauga, 3 from Vaughan, 2 from Hamilton, 2 from Markham, 1 from Barrie, 1 from St. Catharines, and 1 from Guelph.

Employees of Alectra's predecessor companies had previously been represented by the Power Workers' Union, the International Brotherhood of Electrical Workers, and Unifor. Following a vote on June 28, 2017 the majority of unionized employees of Alectra and its subsidiaries agreed to be represented solely by the Power Workers' Union.

== Service area ==
=== Single-tier municipalities ===
- Barrie
- Guelph
- Hamilton

=== Niagara Region ===
- St. Catharines

=== Peel Region ===
- Brampton
- Mississauga

=== Simcoe County ===
- Alliston
- Beeton
- Bradford West Gwillimbury
- Penetanguishene
- Thornton
- Tottenham

=== Wellington County ===
- Rockwood

=== York Region ===
- Aurora
- Markham
- Richmond Hill
- Vaughan

== See also ==
- List of Canadian electric utilities
