= PowerStream =

PowerStream Holdings Incorporated
- Company type: Municipally owned corporation
- Industry: Electricity distribution
- Predecessors: Markham Hydro; Hydro Vaughan; Richmond Hill Hydro; Aurora Hydro; Barrie Hydro
- Founded: 2004
- Defunct: February 1, 2017
- Fate: Merged with Enersource and Horizon Utilities
- Successor: Alectra
- Owners: City of Vaughan; City of Markham; City of Barrie
- Subsidiaries: PowerStream Solar; PowerStream Energy Services; Collus PowerStream (50%)

PowerStream Holdings Incorporated was an electric utility servicing communities north of Toronto and in Central Ontario. Its service areas included Aurora, Alliston, Barrie, Beeton, Bradford West Gwillimbury, Penetanguishene, Markham, Richmond Hill, Thornton, Tottenham and Vaughan.

Powerstream merged with Enersource and Horizon Utilities to form Alectra on February 1, 2017. Through a partnership with the Town of Collingwood it owned a 50% share of Collus PowerStream which serves customers in Collingwood, Stayner, Creemore and Thornbury. The 50% ownership stake in Collus PowerStream was transferred to Alectra before being sold back to the Town of Collingwood in 2017.

== History ==
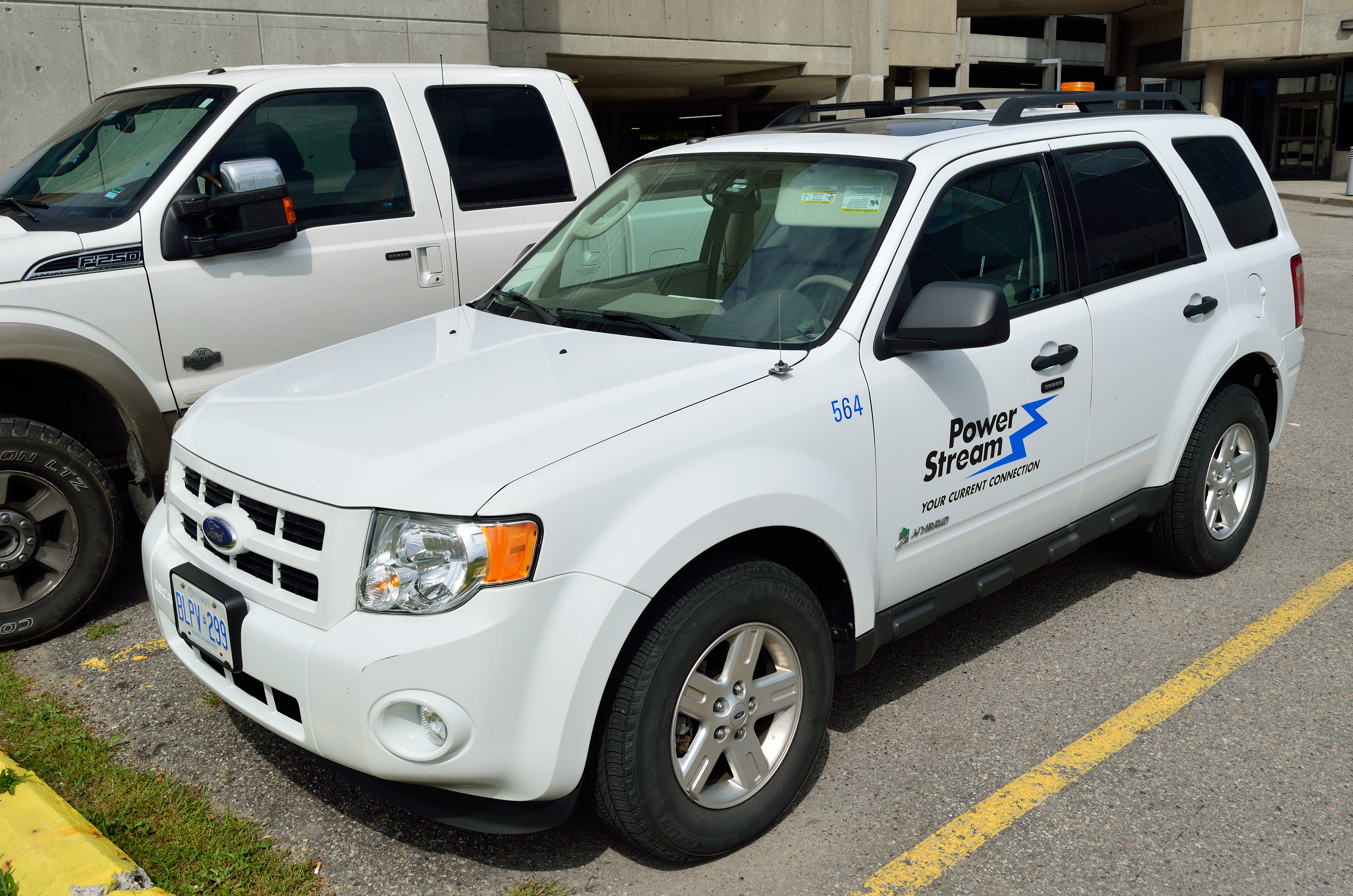
A PowerStream vehicle.

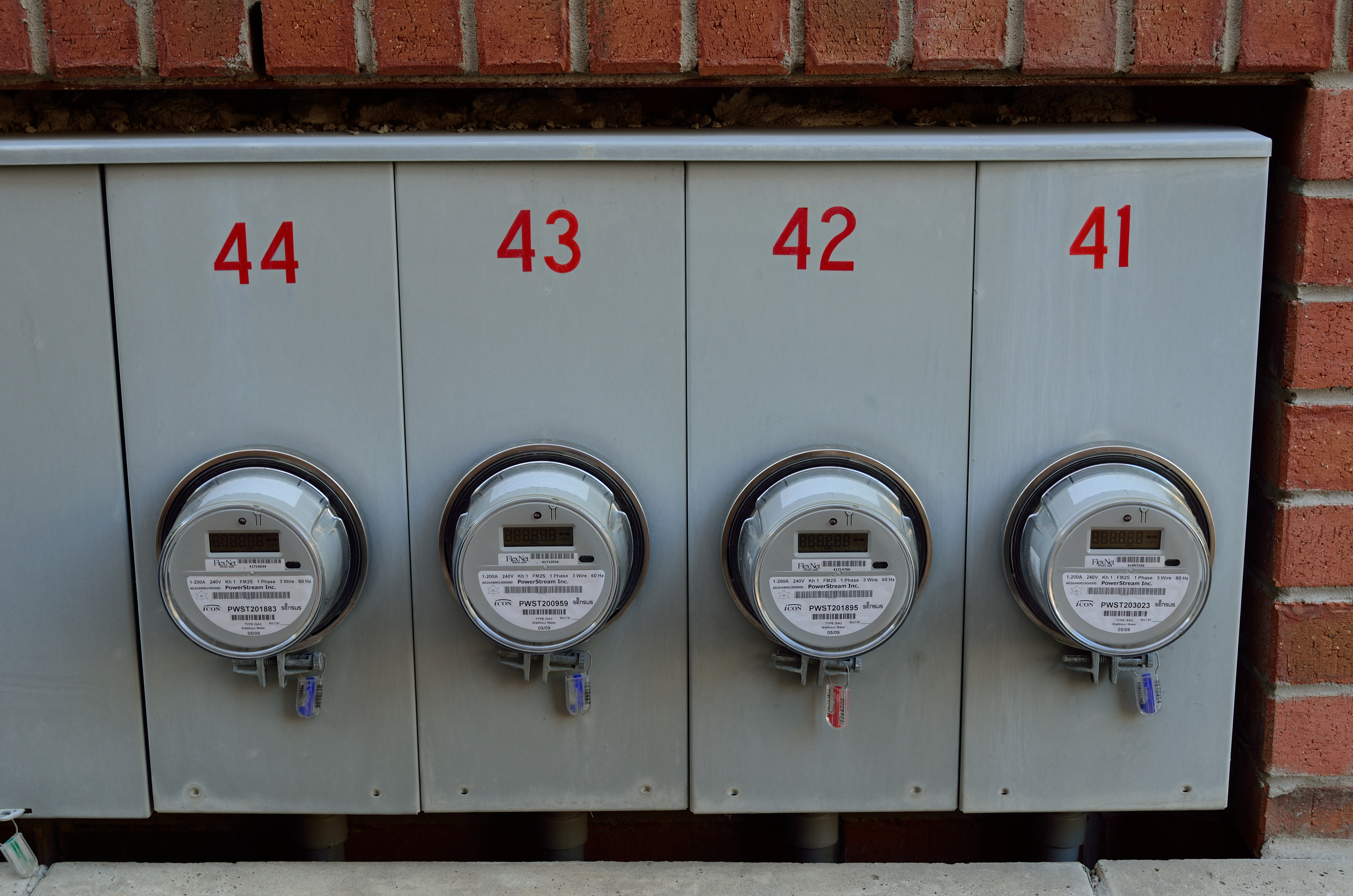
PowerStream electricity meter.

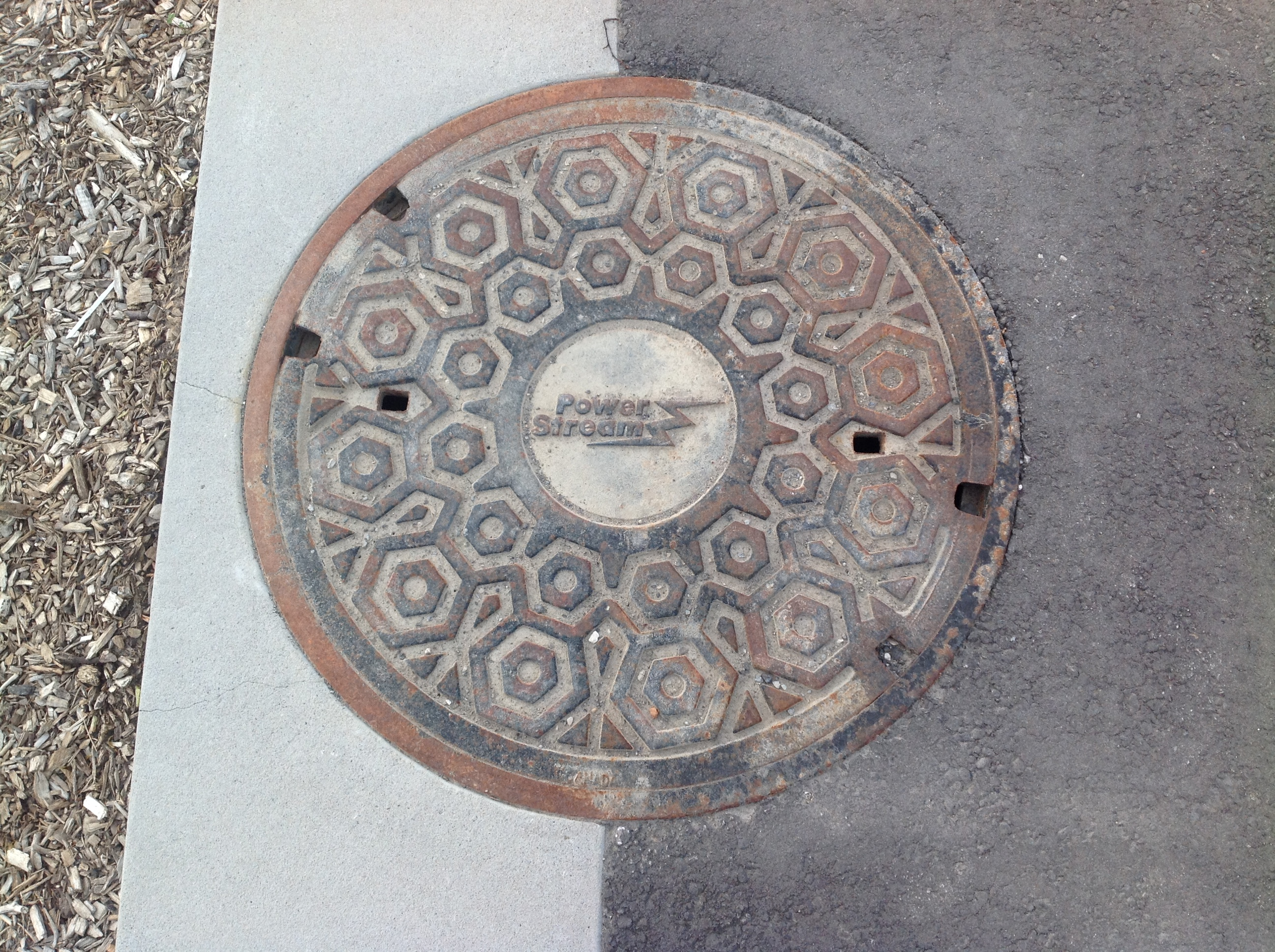
Manhole cover with the logo of PowerStream in Vaughan.

PowerStream was formed as a result of a merger of Markham Hydro, Hydro Vaughan, and Richmond Hill Hydro that took place in 2004. The separate utilities had been created by the York Municipal Hydro-Electric Service Act in 1978. Following the initial merger, PowerStream also gained distribution territory after the purchase of Aurora Hydro in 2005, and Barrie Hydro in 2009.

On August 2, 2012 the company purchased 50 per cent ownership of Collus Power from the Town of Collingwood. As a result of the deal Collus rebranded to Collus PowerStream.

Electricity distributed by PowerStream was primarily provided by Ontario Power Generation and Bruce Power via Hydro One transmission lines from various power plants in Ontario. The all-time peak load for PowerStream was 1,972 MW. PowerStream also operated a renewable generation division under the name PowerStream Solar and was actively involved in conservation and environmental initiatives.

On November 1, 2013, a new affiliate, PowerStream Energy Services Inc., was created to facilitate the pursuit of non-regulated business opportunities. It resulted in a corporate governance restructuring and the establishment of PowerStream Holdings Inc. as the parent company to both entities.

On March 24, 2016, the shareholders of PowerStream Holding's Inc. signed agreements to merge the utility with Enersource (owned by the City of Mississauga and Borealis Infrastructure) Horizon Utilities (owned by the Cities of Hamilton and St. Catharines) and then to purchase the assets of Hydro One Brampton from the Province of Ontario.

== See also ==
- Toronto Hydro
