= The Lies of the Land =

2023 book about rural America by Steven Conn

The Lies of the Land: Seeing Rural America for What It Is – and Isn't
- Cover
- Author: Steven Conn
- Language: English
- Subject: Rural America, militarization, industrialization, corporatization, suburbanization
- Publisher: University of Chicago Press
- Publication date: October 2023
- Publication place: United States
- Media type: Print, e-book
- Pages: 320
- ISBN: 9780226826905

The Lies of the Land: Seeing Rural America for What It Is – and Isn’t is a 2023 book by American historian Steven Conn Published by the University of Chicago Press. Conn discusses how conceptions of rural America compare with realities on the ground, arguing that militarization, industrialization, corporatization, and suburbanization have shaped rural regions in ways similar to urban and suburban areas. The book includes examples of military installations, flood-control initiatives, and large-scale agricultural and mining operations, as well as corporate and suburban developments. The author concludes that focusing on rural America in isolation overlooks the broader trends affecting communities nationwide. The book was shortlisted for the John Brinckerhoff Jackson Book Prize in Landscape Studies.

== Summary ==
Conn examines how ideas about rural America have taken shape and how those ideas compare with the realities on the ground. Through an introductory discussion of the recurring view that these regions are caught between crisis and myth, the author proposes that the same forces shaping urban and suburban areas—specifically militarization, industrialization, corporatization, and suburbanization—have also played central roles in rural communities. This perspective is presented across four sections that focus on how each of these forces has influenced land use, local economies, demographic change, and attitudes toward what it means to live beyond metropolitan centers.

Conn discusses military installations and flood-control projects to highlight the transformation of rural landscapes through federal and local policies. He then addresses the ways agricultural and mining operations have grown into large-scale industrial endeavors, influenced by the same market pressures seen elsewhere. Attention turns to the emergence of corporate structures in rural settings, where chain stores and new agribusiness models complicate long-held notions of self-sufficiency. Conn concludes by describing the suburbanization of rural space and how political frustrations and cultural expectations are shaped by the arrival of new housing developments and commuter patterns. In the final chapter, he argues that viewing rural America in isolation overlooks the integrated and often identical social and economic trends found across the entire country.

== Reviews ==
In his review of the book, Stephen Case admired how Conn challenged the romanticized image of rural America as an idyllic, self-reliant heartland, instead showing it deeply shaped by militarization, industrialization, corporatization and suburbanization. Case appreciated how Conn dismantled myths of rural purity by presenting different case studies in agribusiness, racial tensions and sustainment of industrial scale farming rather than independent family farms and the way in which Conn critiqued the political power of the "big empty," noting that the country’s sparsely populated states wield disproportionate influence in the senate.

Natalia Nebel commended the author for arguing and proving with detailed examples that the ideal small town in rural America that we imagine as a place defined as the opposite of urban space, where people are hardworking, where they value family, religion and independence from the government—is a myth. She appreciated how Conn divided the lies of the land into four: militarized space, industrial space, the development of chain stores founded in rural America, and suburbanization, discussing all of these in detail and backing them by examples. Nebel also admired how Connon offered a fresh insight into rural America as a difficult place to make a living.

The work is an important book for social and rural historians, wrote Douglas Hurt in his review. Hurt found Conn's work to be a fresh perspective on rural America that rejects the stereotype of rural areas as filled with farmland and small town main street businesses by emphasizing and illustrating with different examples as to how the military, industry, corporations and suburbs have shaped these spaces. In his words, "Conn depicts change in rural America as caused by people seeking to improve their lives by pursuing opportunities or development from government and corporations, all of which substantially link rural America to outside institutions’.

Adam Theron Lee found the author to have effectively dismantled the myth that rural America is untouched by human engineering. Lee noted that Conn depicts how rural areas, much like urban and suburban spaces, are deeply structured by modern forces such as militarization, industrialization, corporatization, and suburbanization. But when military installations or industrial sites close down, they leave economic ruin their wake. Chains like Walmart and Dollar General then step in, mapping rural poverty with precision. Conn critiques how highways isolate rural towns, turning them into mere backdrops, wrote Lee. Lee praised the book for revealing how economic forces (along with culture) have shaped rural America’s struggles.

Another reviewer, Michael R. Cope, praised The Lies of the Land by Steven Conn for challenging the myth of rural-urban distinctiveness. Cope highlighted Conn's use of archival research and case studies, such as Fort Cavazos and K.I. Sawyer Air Force Base, to illustrate the economic and social impacts of militarization. He acknowledged Conn’s insights into industrialization through examples like the GM and Honda plants in Ohio and corporatization’s effects on agriculture and retail. However, Cope suggested that Conn’s framework could be enhanced by engaging with boomtown literature and recent sociological studies that further explore these themes.

Daniel Immerwahr started his discussion of the book in The New Yorker by reminding readers of the painting American gothic by Grant Wood. Though it has been deemed as one of the important art pieces of American history, Immerwahr asks in "Beyond the Myth of Rural America" if that picture is really accurate? He discussed how Steven Conn took a long, well researched view through his book, illuminating how the inhabitants of rural America are creatures of state power and industrial revolution. From violently taking lands from native Americans, a state of agriculture that is high-tech capital intensive and dominated by corporations, rural spaces dominated by military bases to strong political participation, Immerwhar admired how Conn step by step debunks the myth of rural America. Immerwahr finished his essay by pointing out that when we look at the American gothic today it is not the architecture that stands out but the pitchfork, calling for demystification and paying attention to what the rich and powerful have done to rural America.

Andrew Milson found the book to be centered on the paradox that rural America can be considered as both an obsession and illusion. Admiring the detailed case study on the processes of their militarization, industrialization, corporatization, and suburbanization’s effects on rural America, Milson found Conn to have asserted that rural America is not in crisis. Rather this has been a chronic condition, misunderstood for years. Wilson noted that Conn’s work could be understood using the framework of the social construction of space and place (although the author never mentioned the terminology) and suggested that geography students will benefit a lot from the book’s perspectives.
