= Enova Power =

Canadian electric utility and distributor

Enova Energy Corporation
- Company type: Municipally owned corporation
- Industry: Electricity distribution
- Predecessors: Kitchener-Wilmot Hydro Inc. Waterloo North Hydro Inc.
- Founded: September 12, 2022; 3 years ago in Kitchener, Ontario
- Headquarters: Kitchener, Ontario
- Areas served: Kitchener; Waterloo; Wellesley; Wilmot; Woolwich
- Key people: Rene W. Gatien (Co-President and CEO); Jerry Van Ooteghem (Co-President and CEO)
- Owners: City of Kitchener (53.4%); City of Waterloo (30.8%); Township of Woolwich (8.5%); Township of Wilmot (4.5%); Township of Wellesley (2.8%)
- Number of employees: 311 (2022)
- Subsidiaries: Alliance Metering Solutions; Enova Energy Services Inc. Enova Power Corp.
- Website: enovapower.com

Enova Energy Corporation, through its subsidiary Enova Power Corp., is an electric utility and distributor that serves most municipalities in the Regional Municipality of Waterloo in Ontario. It is a municipally-owned corporation with shares held by the municipalities to varying degrees.

As of September 2022, it is the seventh-largest electricity distributor in Ontario by number of customers served. In addition to its electric distribution and utility services, Enova Power provides sub-metering through its subsidiary Alliance Metering Solutions.

== Formation ==
Kitchener-Wilmot Hydro Inc. (which previously served Kitchener and Wilmot) and Waterloo North Hydro Inc. (which previously served Waterloo, Wellesley, and Woolwich) were founded in 1978 through mergers of smaller utilities. In 2017, following a provincial review of local electric utilities and distributors, the City of Waterloo, the Township of Woolwich, and the Township of Wellesley proposed three options for the future of the utility: continuing to operate Waterloo North Hydro as is, merging with a local and equal partner, or buying another distributor outright. Plans to merge Waterloo North Hydro with Kitchener-Wilmot Hydro were discussed in October 2021. In December 2021, each of the five municipal councils had approved the merger, and the merger was approved following a review by the Ontario Energy Board. The two utilities officially merged on September 12, 2022.

== Corporate organization ==
Enova is governed through Enova HoldCo and Enova WiresCo. Enova HoldCo has a 13-member board of directors, 7 of whom are independent and 6 represent municipalities (3 from Kitchener, 2 from Waterloo, 1 from Woolwich). Enova WiresCo has a 9-member board of directors, 5 of whom are independent and 4 represent municipalities (2 from Kitchener, 1 from Waterloo, 1 from Woolwich). A representative from Wellesley and a representative from Wilmot are observers for both boards.

== See also ==
- List of Canadian electric utilities
