= Cornwall Street Railway =

Electric street railway in Cornwall, Ontario

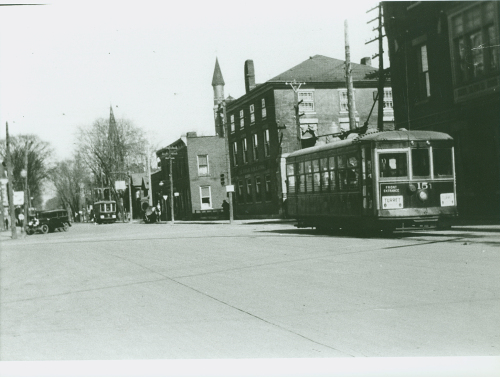
- Streetcars on Pitt Street in 1920.

Overview
- Locale: Cornwall, Ontario, Canada
- Dates of operation: 1896–1971 (end of freight service)
- Successor: Cornwall Transit

Technical
- Track gauge: 4 ft 8 1/2 in (1,435 mm) standard gauge
- Electrification: Yes, Voltage?

The Cornwall Street Railway was an electric street railway in Cornwall, Ontario, Canada that operated from 1896 until 1949, and then as a trolleybus service until 1971 when it was replaced by a conventional bus service known as Cornwall Transit. For much of its history, the company was owned by Sun Life Assurance.

The Street Railway was one of a very few that also ran freight using electric locomotives on the same lines, connecting the industrial areas along the river bank on either side of town to the Grand Trunk Railway on the northern side of town. Freight services continued after the passenger service ended.

The original operating company remains as Cornwall Electric. The company sold power from its hydroelectric assets on the St. Lawrence River since its formation, and today operates as a local distribution company. Although the main lines in the downtown area were lifted in the 1950s, a number of lines outside town remain in use as industrial spurs.

== History ==
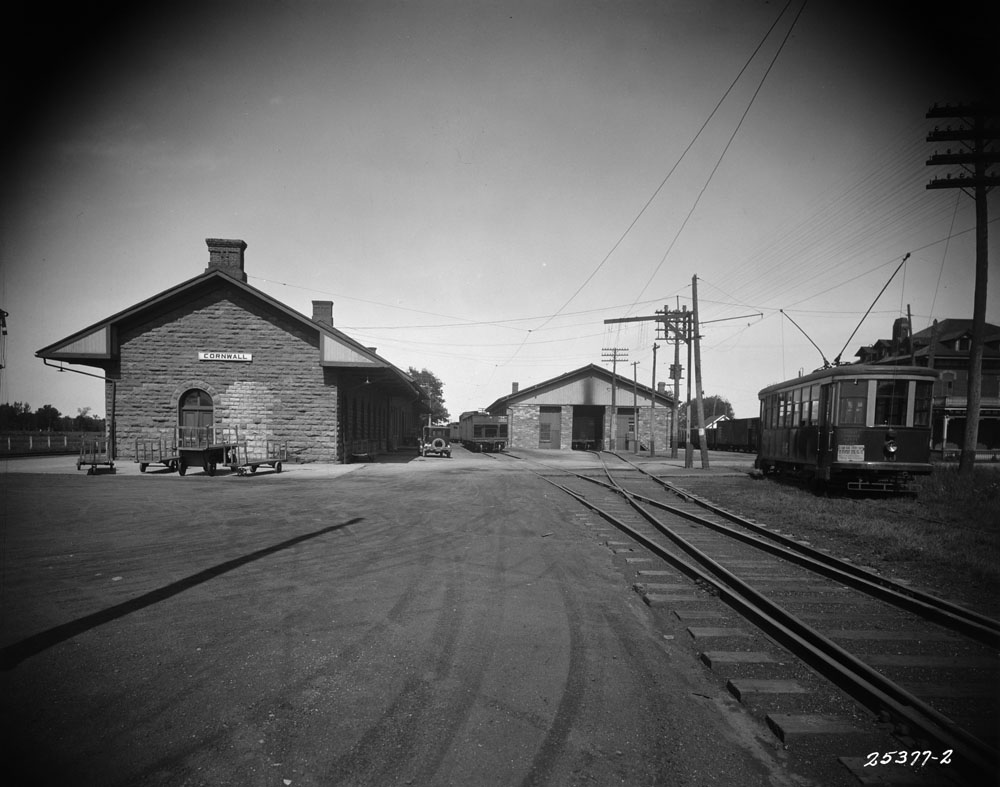
CNR railway station in Cornwall, 1926

An abortive early street railway attempt began in 1885 under the charter of the Cornwall Street Railway Company, which was filed on 11 November 1885 and authorized by the town council a month later, on 14 December. This early street railway was equipped with steam-driven rolling stock, but reportedly the rolling stock sat in the Grand Trunk Railway yard for a number of years unused after arrival, and the street railway had minimal to no operations.

Just over ten years later, a second attempt at a street railway began. On 28 December 1895, the Cornwall town council granted a second street railway charter. This charter was held by the Cornwall Electric Street Railway Company (CESR), which was incorporated in 1896. Initial passenger-only service began on 1 July 1896, marking the commonly accepted start of Cornwall's street railway era. Ridership grew quickly, but the company's financial situation was difficult, and freight service was introduced in 1899 in the hopes of generating more revenue. This resulted in a unique freight switching service which allowed freight cars to be easily transferred to and from the steam mainline and the electric street railway, reducing freight overhead costs.

In 1902, the company's bondholder, the Sun Life Assurance Company, foreclosed. This put Sun Life in the unique position of being an insurance company which owned a railway. Sun Life rechartered and relaunched the company as the Cornwall Street Railway, Light and Power Company, Limited (CSRL&P). This management philosophy in the burgeoning electrical industry in Ontario became increasingly common in the lead-up to the founding of the Hydro-Electric Power Commission of Ontario, as companies sought to vertically integrate electrical power production, distribution, and consumption, especially in the form of electric railways and municipal lighting companies. This local consolidation was completed in 1905 with a merger with the purchase of the Stormont Electric Light and Power Company, resulting in consolidation of the two companies and greater financial sustainability.

Street railways were often politically contentious, especially when managed by private companies, and around the time of the First World War through the 1920s there was a wave of street railway unionizations, strikes, and incidents of civil unrest such as the 1914 Saint John street railway strike in Saint John, New Brunswick. The Cornwall street railway system was not immune and on 3 December 1919 the company was unionized under the Amalgamated Association of Street and Electric Railway Employees of America. However, the company would continue to work to trim down its workforce and cut costs, switching from two-man to one-man crews in 1927 and 1930.

The last significant expansions to the system occurred in the 1930s. In 1931, tracks were installed on Cumberland Street, creating a southern loop along with Water, Pitt, and Second Streets. This was followed in 1934 with the installation of tracks up Cumberland Street to Seventh Street, then across to Pitt Street, completing a second loop. In 1936, the street railway was involved in a civil disturbance, as a motorman attempted to bypass a picket line at the Courtaulds plant to move freight cars on the plant siding. Eight strikers were arrested by the Ontario Provincial Police.

Like with many electric street and interurban railways, the system's swan song occurred during the Second World War, which stimulated freight and commuter traffic and reversed much of the industrial slump caused by the Great Depression. Industrial production had begun to gradually consolidate, and factories became larger and more suburban, forcing workers to commute to them. In Cornwall, the then-secret mustard gas plant on Wallrich Avenue led to the final extension of the system's lines. This would be some of the last passenger traffic on the system, as passenger service would be phased out shortly after the war.

Street railway service was interrupted repeatedly in 1947 by strikes. In August, streetcar operators engaged in a two-day strike for higher wages. This conflict eventually went to arbitration, and workers won a wage increase from one cent to six cents per hour in some departments. However, this was followed almost immediately by a second, eight-day strike in September, as the company had scaled wage increases to pay rather than applying a blanket increase, which the union claimed as overstepping its authority, and renewed its demand for a 12-cent increase. Ultimately, the strike was ended when the union, management, and Ontario Minister of Labour Charles Daley met in Toronto and scrapped the earlier arbitration decision, replacing it with a blanket retroactive 5-cent increase, plus a 3-cent increase going forward, and improvements to overtime pay.

In 1949, the company made the decision to end streetcar service permanently and switch to trolleybus service. This was a part of the general postwar wave of streetcar elimination in North America. Many systems had been poorly maintained during the 1930s and 1940s, as the war and the Great Depression starved them of funds and materials for repair, and many streetcar manufacturers closed or shifted to manufacturing other types of vehicles, making it difficult and expensive to purchase new streetcars, as opposed to cheaper, standardized bus models. Auto manufacturers had grown explosively during the Second World War due to government contracts for military vehicles, and public funds became more widely available for paved asphalt roads and highway construction.

By the early 1970s, Sun Life began to slowly divest itself of the company, and various aspects of its operations were sold off. Electrical distribution continued under Cornwall Electric, freight under CN Rail, and passenger transportation under the municipally owned Cornwall Transit. In a contentious move, trolleybuses were replaced with diesel buses in 1971, and the historic depot at Pitt and Water Streets which had served the system since 1896 was demolished and replaced with the Cornwall Square mall. This ended one of the last visible remnants of the streetcar service.

Railway operations, however, did not end, and electric freight service continued until 1971, shortly after the company's freight operations were purchased by CN Rail. Electric freight service was replaced with diesel as part of a general wave of dieselization of the remaining electric freight railways in Ontario. Dieselization allowed companies to abandon the then-aging electric rolling stock, and to operate the same diesel trains on formerly-electric rail lines as on non-electric mainlines, simplifying freight operations. The last electric freight operation occurred on Saturday 9 October 1971, on what was a cold and rainy day. However, by this point the remaining railway infrastructure had been reduced to a number of industrial spurs connecting to the CN mainline, with most of the original street running sections having been removed in the 1950s after the switch to trolleybuses for passenger service.

== Routes ==
The first two routes, in 1896, were a 1.5-mile (2.4 km) route on Pitt Street and a 3-mile (4.8 km) route on Montreal Street. In 1949, the last year of streetcar service, three routes in total were operated along Montreal Street, Pitt Street, and a belt line.

== Rolling stock ==
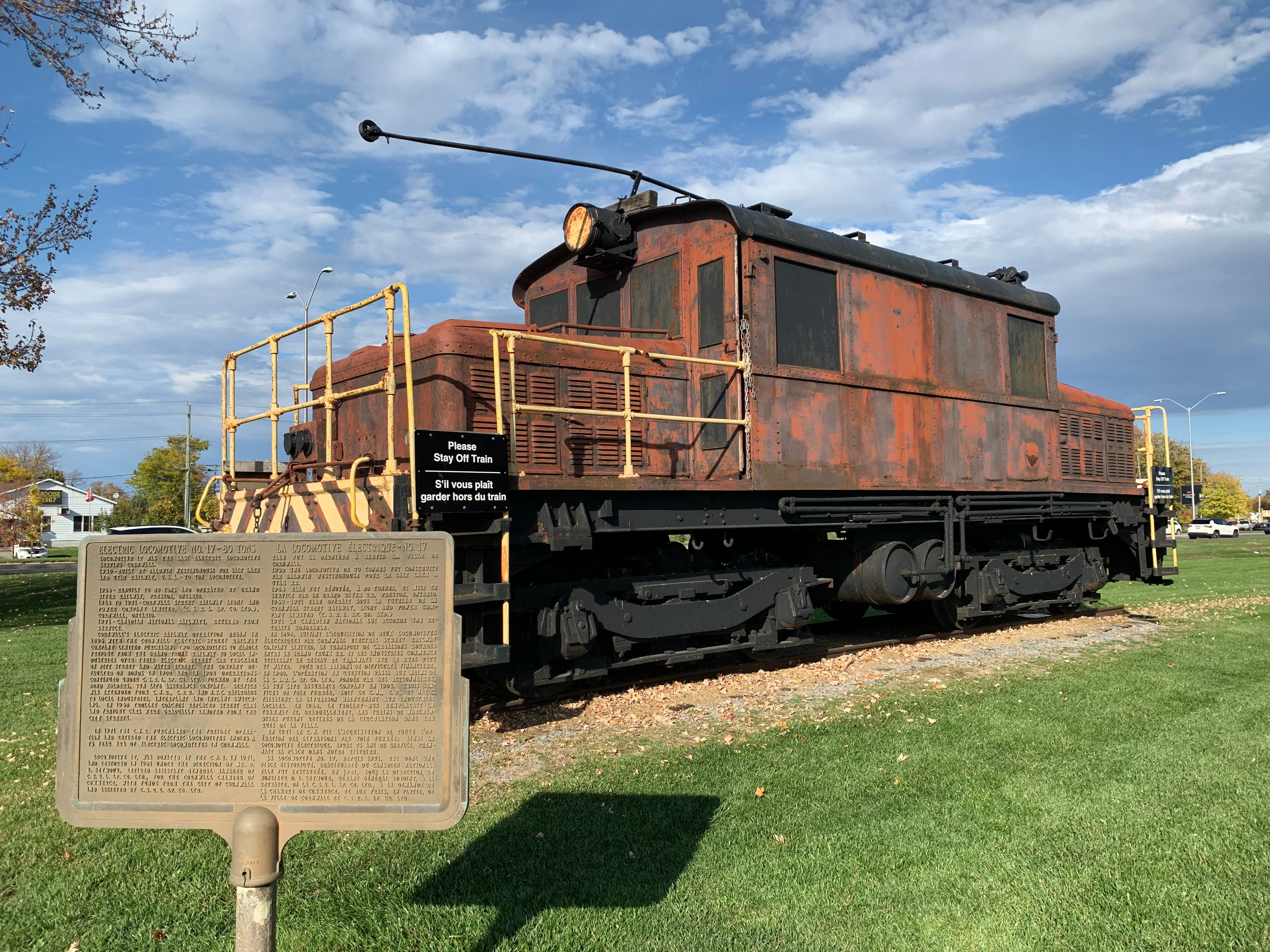
Locomotive #17, the last electric freight locomotive operating in Cornwall, now on permanent display.

None of the early steam rolling stock is known to have survived. Some later vehicles and pieces of equipment, however, have been preserved in various forms:

- #11 (freight motor) is displayed at the Ohio Railway Museum under its original livery as Youngstown and Ohio River Railroad #7
- #16 (freight motor) is displayed at the Halton County Radial Railway under its later livery as Lake Erie and Northern Railway #335
- #17 (freight motor) is on permanent display in Cornwall
- B-1 (snow sweeper) is in storage at the Canada Science and Technology Museum
- #3152 (snow plow) built in 1925 by Canadian Car and Foundry is displayed at the Shore Line Trolley Museum

== See also ==
- Cornwall, Ontario
- Cornwall Electric
- Cornwall Transit
