= Hydro Ottawa =

Municipal electrical utility in Ottawa, Ontario, Canada

Hydro Ottawa Limited
- Industry: Electricity distribution
- Predecessors: Casselman Hydro; Gloucester Hydro; Goulbourn Hydro; Kanata Hydro; Nepean Hydro; Ottawa Hydro
- Founded: 2000; 26 years ago in Ottawa, Ontario
- Headquarters: Ottawa, Ontario
- Key people: Bryce Conrad (president and CEO)
- Owner: City of Ottawa
- Website: hydroottawa.com

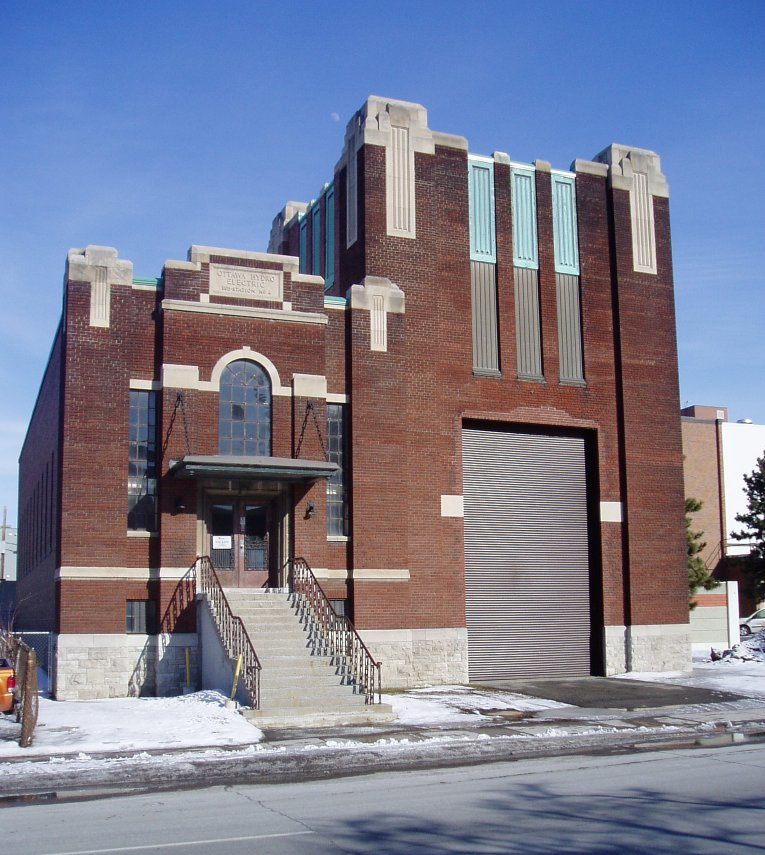
Ottawa Hydro Electric Substation No. 4

Hydro Ottawa Limited is a regulated electricity distribution company operating in the City of Ottawa and the Village of Casselman in Ontario, Canada. As the third-largest municipally-owned electrical utility in Ontario, Hydro Ottawa maintains the electricity distribution systems in the city, and serves over 335,000 residential and commercial customers across a service area of 1,100 square kilometres.

== History ==
Hydro Ottawa was formed in November 2000 from the amalgamation of five local distribution companies (Gloucester Hydro, Goulbourn Hydro, Kanata Hydro, Nepean Hydro and Ottawa Hydro). The history of the supply of electricity began in the 1880s with private electrical suppliers, became public in the early 1900s and continued in competition with private suppliers, chiefly those of Thomas Ahearn and his companies, until the 1950s.

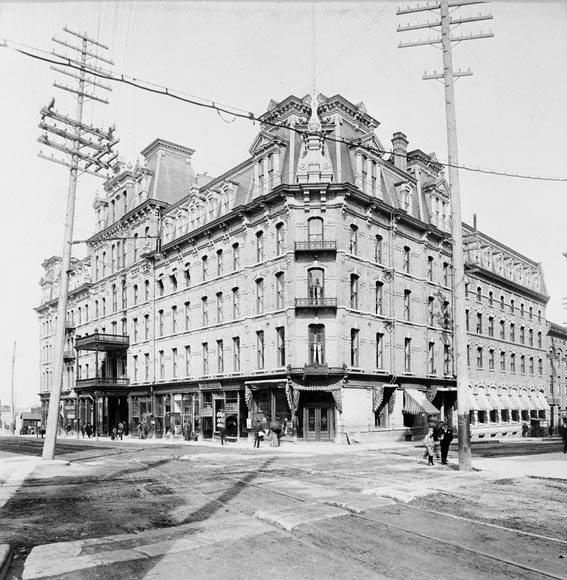
1882 image demonstrating the new power lines in front of the Russell House Hotel (Ottawa's foremost hotel at the time) located at the corner of Sparks Street and Elgin Street

In 1882, Electric lighting in Ottawa started in at Young's mill in LeBreton Flats (the previous year had seen Eddy's mill lit by electricity, on the Hull side). A year later, the House of Commons and the Senate were illuminated.

The first electric street lighting in Canada occurred on Victoria Day, 1884 when the Peterborough Light and Power Company lit 17 arc lights on George Street in Peterborough Ontario. In 1885, the Royal Electric Company (of Montreal, formed in 1884) set up street lighting systems in Charlottetown and St. John's, Newfoundland. Ottawa had originally intended on using this company to light the city's streets, however, council contracted Ottawa Electric Light Company (formed 1884) to install 165 arc lamps on the city's streets. That company, which had as a director one of its founders Francis Clemow, along with founder lumber baron G. B. Pattee, had built a power station which used a water-powered generator. In May 1885, the streets of Ottawa were lit by electricity.

In 1887, the Chaudière Electric Light and Power Company was formed by Thomas Ahearn, a local man and partner of Ahearn & Soper, formed in the early 1880s. In 1890, there were two electrical providers, (Clemow's) Ottawa Electric Light Company, and Ahearn's company, Chaudière Electric Light and Power Company.

In 1894 Ahearn merged Ottawa Electric Light Company, and Chaudière Electric Light and Power Company, and bought out Standard Electric Company of Ottawa (Limited) in the process, naming it Ottawa Electric Company, creating a virtual monopoly on electrical services in Ottawa. (Erskine Henry Bronson played a role in the development of this company).

The following decades would see a continuous struggle between the City of Ottawa and Thomas Ahearn regarding the supplying of electricity to the city. In 1899 (possibly 1901), a charter was granted by the city to Consumers Electric, a rival company to Ahearn's Ottawa Electric Company. In 1905, The City purchased Consumers Electric for $200,000, ending Ahearn's ongoing attempts at acquiring the company. They renamed it "Municipal Electric Department" which was the city's public electricity provider.

In 1908 Ahearn & Soper bought the Ottawa Gas Company, and with the Ottawa Electric Company formed the Ottawa Light, Heat and Power Company Limited. This parent holding company wholly owned the two previous companies and would refer to Ottawa Electric as its "Ottawa Electric division" well into the new century. This meant that there were no longer outside shareholders to Ottawa Electric, but there were shareholders to Ottawa Light, Heat and Power Company.

In 1915 the "Municipal Electric Department" became Ottawa Hydro; named as the "Ottawa Hydro Electric Commission", when it joined forces with the provincial network of the Ontario Hydro Electric Commission.

In 1920 Ottawa Light, Heat and Power Company Limited acquired the assets of The Ottawa Power Company, Limited which included the power plant at Victoria Island (Ottawa River) erected in 1900.

In 1950 Ottawa Hydro acquired the "Ottawa Light, Heat and Power Company, Limited", removing the last private sector competitor.

Hydro Ottawa was formed in 2000 when five municipal local distribution companies were merged: Gloucester Hydro, Goulbourn Hydro, Kanata Hydro, Nepean Hydro and Ottawa Hydro. In May 2002, Casselman Hydro also became a part of Hydro Ottawa.

== Ottawa Hydro Electric Company Building - 109 Bank Street ==
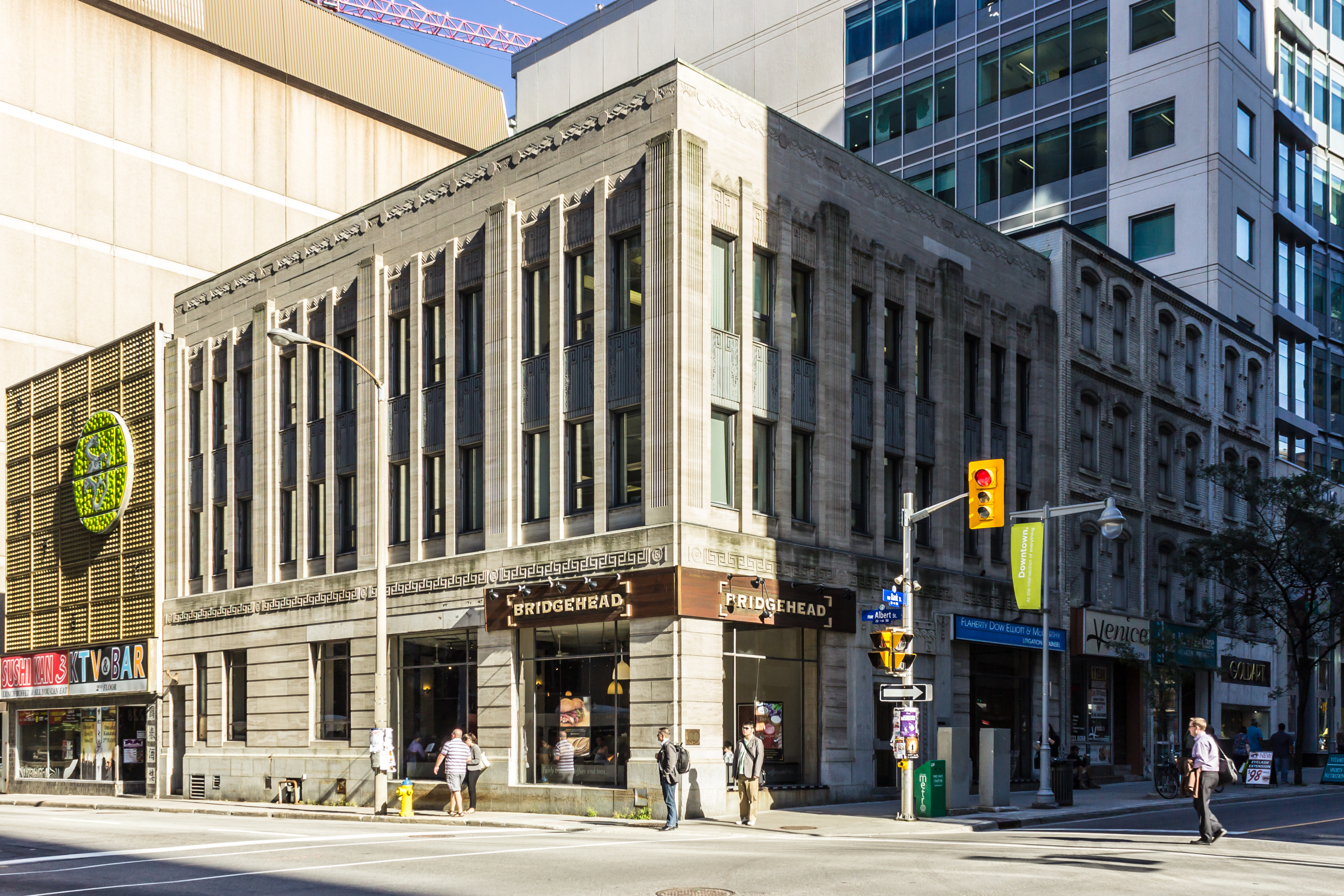
The building at Bank Street

Ottawa Hydro Electric Company Building (Bridgehead at street level) is a heritage building in Ottawa located at 109 Bank Street, on the south-east corner of Albert Street. It was designated under Part IV of the Ontario Heritage Act in 1992. Ottawa Hydro commissioned W. C. Beattie to design this Art Deco style office building in 1934. It was Ottawa Hydro's headquarters until 1957.

== Current services ==
Hydro Ottawa provides electricity supply to its customers, by taking electricity from the provincial grid and distributing it to homes and businesses. Hydro Ottawa also offers programs to help customers conserve electricity.

== See also ==
- List of Canadian electric utilities
