= Toronto Hydro =

Electric utility company in Toronto, Ontario, Canada

Toronto Hydro Corporation
- Trade name: Toronto Hydro
- Type: Municipally owned corporation
- Industry: Electric utility
- Predecessor: Toronto Hydro-Electric Commission
- Founded: 1998
- Headquarters: 14 Carlton Street; Toronto, Ontario
- Area served: Toronto, Ontario
- Key people: Jana Mosley (President & CEO); David McFadden (Chair of the Board)
- Revenue: ▲$3,601.7 million CAN (total revenue) (2022)
- Net income: ▲$163.9 million CAN (after net movements in regulatory balances) (2022)
- Total assets: ▲$6,947.0 million CAN (total assets and regulatory balance) (2022)
- Total equity: ▲$2,062.0 million CAN (total equity) (2022)
- Owner: City of Toronto
- Number of employees: 1,245 (2022)
- Subsidiaries: Toronto Hydro-Electric System Limited; Toronto Hydro Energy Services Inc.
- Website: torontohydro.com

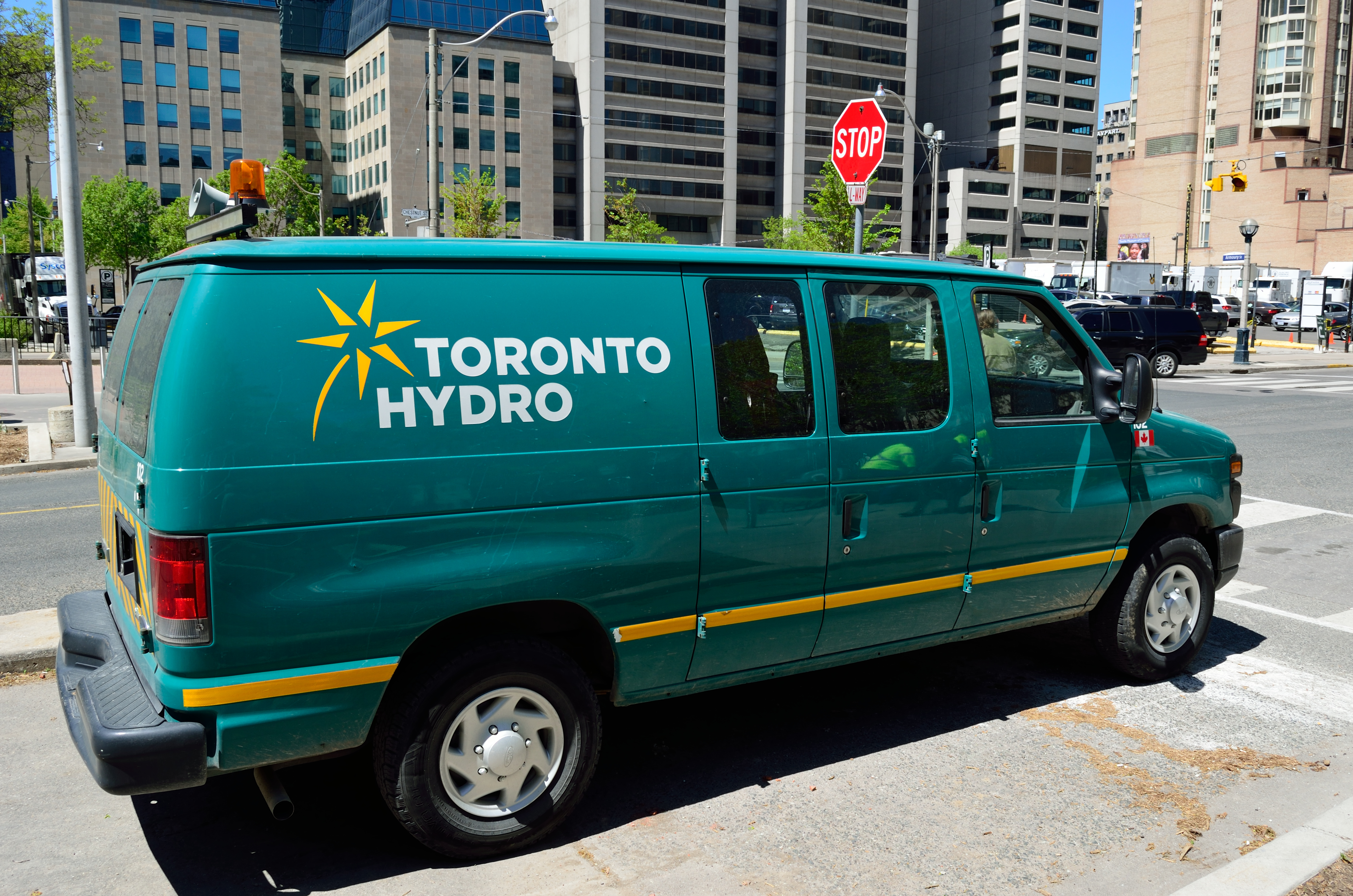
Toronto Hydro vehicle

Toronto Hydro Corporation is an electric utility that operates the electricity distribution system for the city of Toronto, Ontario, Canada. As of 2018, it serves approximately 772,000 customers and delivers approximately 19% of the electricity consumed in Ontario.

== History ==
Toronto Hydro has been serving the city of Toronto for over a century.

1910s: Electricity first came to Toronto in the late 1880s. A number of private companies were formed to meet demand. In 1908, Torontonians voted overwhelmingly for the formation of a municipal electricity company. Toronto Hydro-Electric System was introduced on May 2, 1911 at Old City Hall.

1920s: Toronto Hydro merged with the private electricity companies in the 1920s, leading to a 95 per cent increase in the number of meters and a 200 per cent increase in the kilowatt-hours (kWh) sold. Further demand came from an approximately 50 per cent rise in appliance sales.

1930s: Demand for electricity decreased for the first time during the Depression. In order to protect jobs, unionized workers agreed to reduce their work hours to 40 hours per week. While some layoffs were necessary, those jobs were offered back to employees when electricity consumption picked up in 1940.

By Toronto's centennial in 1934, the city had approximately 920 kilometres (km) of paved streets, 880 km of which were lit by electricity. In 1937, Toronto Hydro sold more than 1 billion kWh of electricity for the first time in its history.

1940s: During the Second World War, Toronto Hydro appealed to its customers to conserve energy. Electricity consumption for signs, show-windows, displays and advertising was banned. Street lighting was reduced by approximately 20 per cent and daylight saving time was extended throughout winter to reduce the afternoon peak electrical load. The increased efficiency created a profit that Toronto Hydro passed down to its customers in temporary rate reductions.

1950s: Between 1945 and 1955, Toronto's kWh consumption increased by 75 per cent. This was due to the post-war baby boom and increased immigration. Toronto Hydro raced to keep up, building 12 new electrical substations throughout the city. The electrical system was converted from 25 Hertz (cycles per second) to 60 Hertz, and over 200,000 meters were replaced.

1960s: The convenience of electricity was heavily promoted. As a result, electricity use grew at home and in the workplace. Between 1964 and 1974, Toronto Hydro spent more than $31 million to put overhead wires and transformers underground.

1970s: As environmentalism grew, Toronto Hydro introduced a variety of energy conservation programs and incentives to customers.

The building boom of the late 1960s meant that in 1970, Toronto Hydro's peak load increased 5.6 per cent over the previous year. New additions to the Toronto skyline, including the CN Tower, First Canadian Place, the Royal Bank Plaza and Hydro Place, added over 44,500 kW of demand to the grid.

1980s: In the 1980s, Toronto Hydro became the largest municipal electricity distribution utility in Canada. The organization introduced a customized Supervisory Control and Data Acquisition system (SCADA), which enabled operators to accurately and remotely monitor the distribution system.

As Toronto Hydro moved to digital, other organizations followed suit. The introduction of desktop computers, printers, networks and photocopiers meant additional demand.

1990s: On January 1, 1998, Bill 103 amalgamated six municipal electric utilities into one, nearly tripling Toronto Hydro's customer base to approximately 650,000 customers.

In January 1998, approximately 350 employees helped restore power following the ice storm in eastern Ontario and southern Quebec. Crews worked 12 to 20 hours a day and coped with harsh conditions and unfamiliar equipment. In 1999, the City of Toronto became Toronto Hydro's sole shareholder when the utility incorporated.

2000s: In 2001, Toronto Hydro began powering 100 vehicles with low-sulphur diesel and soy-based biodiesel fuel.

In December 2002, Toronto Hydro built a 65-metre tall wind turbine at Exhibition Place in partnership with the Toronto Renewable Energy Co-operative (TREC). Toronto Hydro launched its first smart meter projects in 2005 to approximately 500 customers, and, in 2010, started transitioning customers to Time-of-Use rates to help them better manage their electricity bills.

2010s: In 2011, Toronto Hydro launched various social media channels, which has given its customers the ability to interact with the organization in a variety of convenient ways.

In 2013, Toronto Hydro started construction on the new Clare R. Copeland Transformer Station, the first underground station in downtown Toronto.

In 2015, Toronto Hydro unveiled Hydrostor, the world's first underwater compressed air energy storage system, located three kilometres off Toronto Island. This "underwater battery" stores electricity when demand is low and can be released when the grid needs a boost.

In 2016, Toronto Hydro installed the world's first pole-top energy storage unit. The unit's lithium-ion batteries charge during off-peak hours and then discharge energy to Toronto Hydro's grid during peak hours.

The Ontario Energy Board approved Toronto Hydro's 2015-2019 rates application. Over this five-year period, Toronto Hydro has secured more than $2 billion in capital funding that it will use to meet the growing demand for electricity, to safeguard against extreme weather events and upgrade aging infrastructure.

== Facilities ==
Toronto Hydro once operated district heating and electric generation facilities in the downtown area:

- Scott Street power plant at Esplanade was built by Toronto Electric Light Company (TELCO) in 1882 and acquired by Toronto Hydro in 1910. The plant supplied power to street lights and later for streetcar operations (by Toronto Railway Company in 1891). In 1922 it was closed as Toronto Terminals Railway needed the land for their railway corridor into Union Station. Originally coal-fired and converted into gas.
- Terauley Street Dynamo House was built by Toronto Incandescent Electric Light Company (TIELC) in 1889. TIELC was acquired by TELCO along with this facility in 1896. This facility later became a transformer substation.
- Central Heating Plant at York Street and Lake Shore Boulevard West from 1922 to 1990s. Designed by Hugh Griffith Jones (1872–1947) and demolished in 1990 (site used as parking lot until 2010s to build ICE Condominiums).

== Awards ==
Toronto Hydro has been recognized with the following awards:

- 2018 Canada's Safest Employers gold safety award
- 2018 Canadian Electricity Association President's Award of Excellence for Employee Safety
- 2018 Canadian Electricity Association Sustainable Electricity Award for Leadership in External Collaboration and Partnerships
- 2018 Best 50 Corporate Citizens in Canada

== See also ==
- Hydro One
- List of Canadian electric utilities
- Hydroelectricity
- Alternative energy
- Utility company
