= Capital Power Income =

North American electricity company

Capital Power Income L.P.
- Type: Limited partnership
- Traded as: TSX: CPA.UN
- Industry: Electric generation
- Founded: March 27, 1997
- Defunct: November 7, 2011
- Fate: Acquired
- Successor: Atlantic Power Corporation
- Headquarters: Edmonton, Alberta, Canada
- Key people: Stuart Lee, President
- Number of employees: 24 (2008)
- Website: www.capitalpowerincome.ca

Capital Power Income L.P. was a limited partnership that was engaged in the generation, acquisition, and sale of electricity in Canada and the United States.

The Edmonton, Alberta-based company was founded in 2002, and acquired by Atlantic Power Corporation in 2011.

The company owned and operated a number of power plants and other assets in Canada and the United States, including coal-fired, natural gas-fired, and wind energy facilities. It sold electricity to a range of customers, including utilities, industrial users, and other power marketers.

Capital Power Income was the parent company of Capital Power Corporation, which is still operational today as a publicly traded company in the business of electricity generation and transmission.

== History ==
Founded as TransCanada Power L.P. the company was renamed EPCOR Power L.P. after TransCanada Corporation sold its interest in the partnership to EPCOR Utilities Incorporated on September 1, 2005. It was then renamed on November 5, 2009 to reflect the transfer of ownership from EPCOR Utilities to its newly created spin-off Capital Power Corporation.

On November 7, 2011, Atlantic Power Corporation completed it plan of arrangement to acquire the company.

== See also ==
- EPCOR Utilities Incorporated
- Capital Power Corporation
