= Synergy North =

Synergy North Corporation
- Company type: Municipally owned corporation
- Industry: Electricity distribution
- Predecessors: Thunder Bay Hydro; Kenora Hydro
- Founded: January 1, 2019; 7 years ago
- Headquarters: 34 Cumberland St. N., Thunder Bay, Ontario, Canada
- Areas served: Kenora, Thunder Bay
- Owners: City of Kenora; City of Thunder Bay
- Website: synergynorth.ca

Synergy North Corporation is a municipally-owned local power distribution company which services the cities of Thunder Bay and Kenora in Ontario, Canada. It was formed on January 1, 2019 through the merger of Kenora Hydro and Thunder Bay Hydro.

The company is headquartered in Thunder Bay and governed by a 16-member board of directors, 8 members appointed by the Thunder Bay City Council and 8 appointed by Kenora City Council.

== Thunder Bay Hydro ==
Thunder Bay Hydro was formed in 1970 when Fort William Hydro and the Port Arthur Public Utilities Commission were merged coinciding with the amalgamation of Fort William and Port Arthur into the city of Thunder Bay.
