= Saint John Energy =

Municipally owned electricity utility in Canada

Power Commission of the City of Saint John
- Trade name: Saint John Energy
- Company type: Municipally owned corporation
- Industry: Electric power distribution
- Founded: 1922; 104 years ago
- Headquarters: Saint John, New Brunswick
- Area served: Saint John, New Brunswick
- Owner: City of Saint John
- Website: sjenergy.ca

The Power Commission of the City of Saint John, operating as Saint John Energy, is a municipally owned electricity distribution utility in Saint John, New Brunswick. It was established in 1922 and serves residential and business customers in the city.

Saint John Energy purchases electricity from NB Power and distributes it through a local network that includes substations, utility poles, overhead lines and underground power lines.

== Renewable energy projects ==
In 2025, Saint John Energy announced a partnership with Universal Kraft and Neqotkuk (Tobique First Nation) for a solar farm on Old Black River Road in Saint John. Media reports described the project as a 10-megawatt solar farm scheduled for installation by 2027.
