= Saskatoon Light & Power =

- Company type: Municipally owned corporation
- Industry: Electricity distribution
- Founded: 1906
- Headquarters: Saskatoon, Saskatchewan, Canada
- Products: Electricity
- Owner: City of Saskatoon
- Number of employees: 140
- Website: www.saskatoon.ca/services-residents/power-water-sewer/saskatoon-light-power

Saskatoon Light & Power (SL&P) is a utility that provides electrical services within parts of the city of Saskatoon, Saskatchewan, Canada. Founded in 1906, SL&P is a municipally owned corporation that is wholly owned by the City of Saskatoon. The utility provides electrical service within the boundaries of Saskatoon as they stood in 1958, except for on the grounds of the University of Saskatchewan. In all other areas of the province, including areas of Saskatoon outside the historical 1958 boundary, electricity is distributed by the provincial utility SaskPower. SaskPower is also the supplier of the electricity that is distributed by SL&P.

In 2014, SL&P opened a landfill gas power generation facility which generates approximately $1.3 million in revenue annually from selling electricity to SaskPower.
