= EPCOR Utilities =

Utility company based in Edmonton, Alberta

EPCOR Utilities Inc.

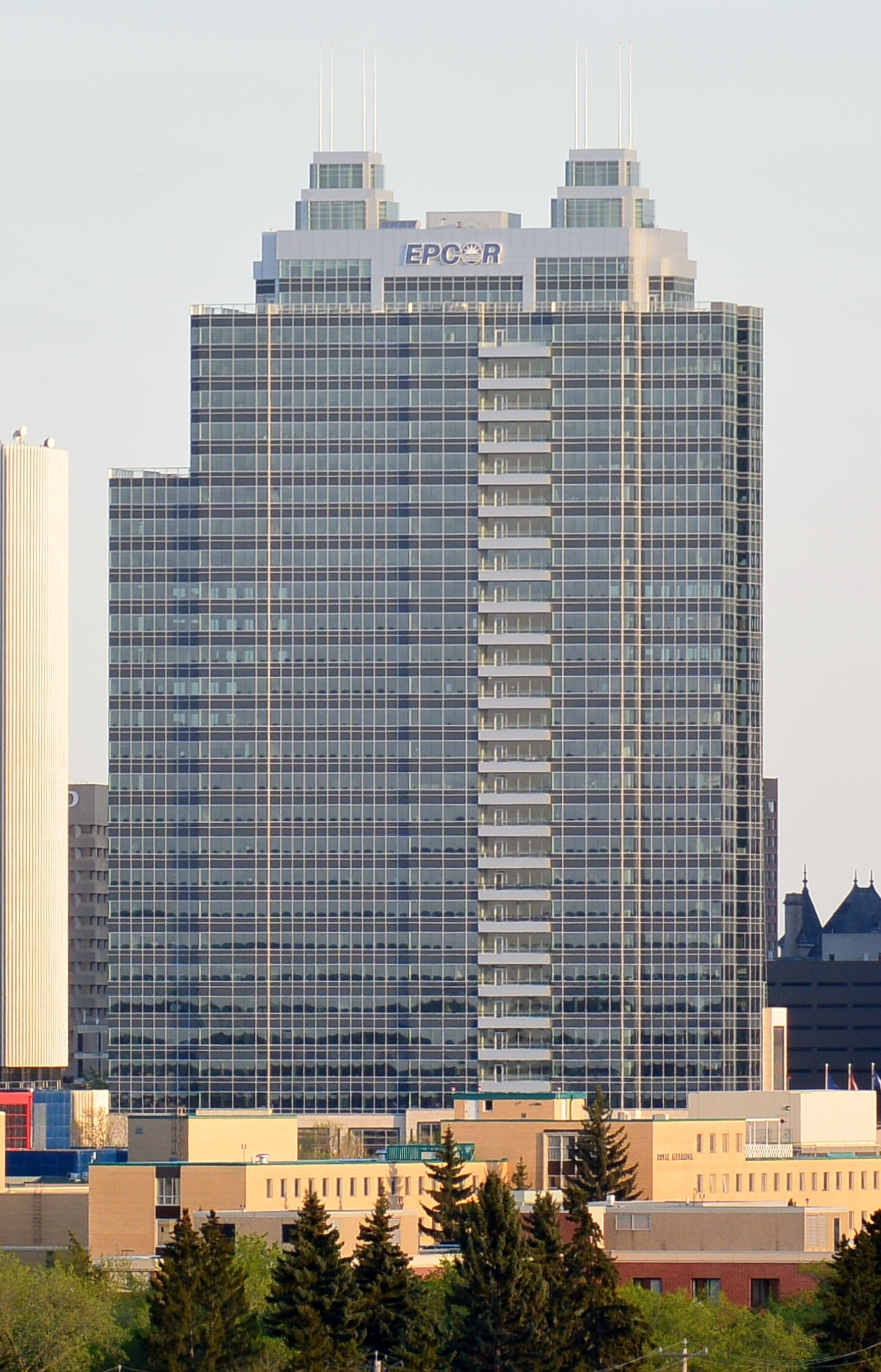
- Formerly: Edmonton Power Corporation
- Type: Municipally owned corporation
- Industry: Public utility
- Founded: 1996
- Headquarters: Edmonton, Alberta, Canada
- Areas served: Canada; United States
- Key people: John Elford (President and CEO)
- Revenue: 1.3 bil USD
- Owner: City of Edmonton
- Number of employees: 3600 (2020)
- Website: epcor.com

EPCOR Utilities Inc., formerly known as Edmonton Power Corporation, is a utility company based in Edmonton, Alberta. EPCOR manages water, wastewater, natural gas, and electricity distribution systems in the Canadian provinces of Alberta, British Columbia, Saskatchewan, and Ontario, and the American states of Arizona, New Mexico, and Texas. In addition, the company maintains and provides engineering support for traffic signals and street lights within the City of Edmonton, as well as other cities in Alberta. EPCOR is a municipally owned corporation with the City of Edmonton as sole shareholder.

== History ==
Created in 1996 as the Edmonton Power Corporation, the company history dates back to the Edmonton Electric Lighting and Power Company formed in 1891. The name EPCOR was introduced in 2001. EPCOR's name is derived from Edmonton Power Corporation as authorized under City of Edmonton Bylaw 11071.

EPCOR previously owned five power generating facilities within the province of Alberta. The decision was made on April 17, 2009 to divest of power producing assets through the creation of a publicly traded company; Capital Power Corporation. EPCOR Power LP, a limited partnership with EPCOR Utilities Inc., was transferred to Capital Power Corporation and renamed Capital Power Income L.P.

In October 2008, EPCOR was named one of "Canada's Top 100 Employers" by Mediacorp Canada Inc., and was featured in Maclean's newsmagazine. Later that month, EPCOR was named one of Alberta's Top Employers, which was announced by the Calgary Herald and the Edmonton Journal. EPCOR was also named one of Canada's Top 10 Earth Friendly Employers in 2008.

In 2011, EPCOR acquired Chaparral City Water Company (serving the Fountain Hills, Arizona area) from American States Water and the Arizona and New Mexico operations of American Water.

== See also ==
- EPCOR Tower
- Capital Power Corporation
- Capital Power Income L.P.
