= Cornwall Transit =

Public transportation in Cornwall, Ontario, Canada

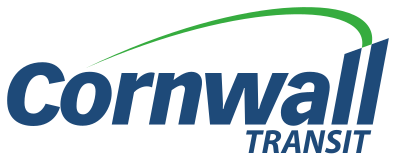
- Founded: 1971
- Headquarters: 863 Second St. West, Cornwall ON
- Service area: Cornwall, Ontario
- Service type: Bus service, Paratransit
- Routes: 7 regular routes 1 Community bus 4 Industrial specials
- Stops: 305
- Fleet: 14
- Operator: City of Cornwall
- Website: Cornwall Transit

Cornwall Transit (also known as TheBus, its fonts similar to Honolulu, Hawaii's), serves the City of Cornwall, Ontario, Canada with 15 buses that transport about 538,833 passengers per year. Founded in 1971 and originally operated under contract by A.J. McDonald Limited the system has been city run since 1974. It provided bus service to replace the Cornwall Street Railway, which had provided tram service since the end of the 19th century.

A comprehensive service review conducted in 2000 focused on the needs of three specific groups: students, industrial employees, and seniors. The report, based on one primary principle: transit should directly and conveniently take passengers where they want to go, was approved by council in November 2000, and many of the recommendations were immediately implemented. Several types of service are now provided, including conventional bus routes, community bus, paratransit service, supplementary industry area service and charters.

== Services ==
Cornwall Transit operates 7 conventional transit routes and 1 community bus route. 6 of these services are interlined, with the interconnected routes maintaining the same number on both routes.

  - 1 Pitt
  - 2 Sunrise
  - 3 Brookdale
  - 4 Riverdale
  - 5 McConnell
  - 6 Cumberland
  - 7 Montreal
  - 61 Community Bus

Additionally, the operator runs a fixed industrial service with four different deviations to serve the needs and shifts of workers at city plants.

  - S1: loop through the industrial sector running every 30 minutes
  - S2: one early morning run to the Prince Foods plant
  - S3: two midday runs to the Prince Foods and SCM plants
  - S4: one midnight run from the Prince Foods plant

Cornwall also operates the Handi-Transit paratransit service for physically challenged individuals, as well as a community bus route that offers several midday flexible loops based on passenger demand.

== Fleet ==
The fleet consists of 14 LFS (4th generation) with diesel and diesel-electric hybrid propulsion used for regular routes

Cornwall once operated trolleybuses with 16 Canadian Car and Foundry T-44 used from 1949 to 1970. Upon the termination of trolleybus service 12 T-44 were sold to the Toronto Transit Commission for parts.

== History ==
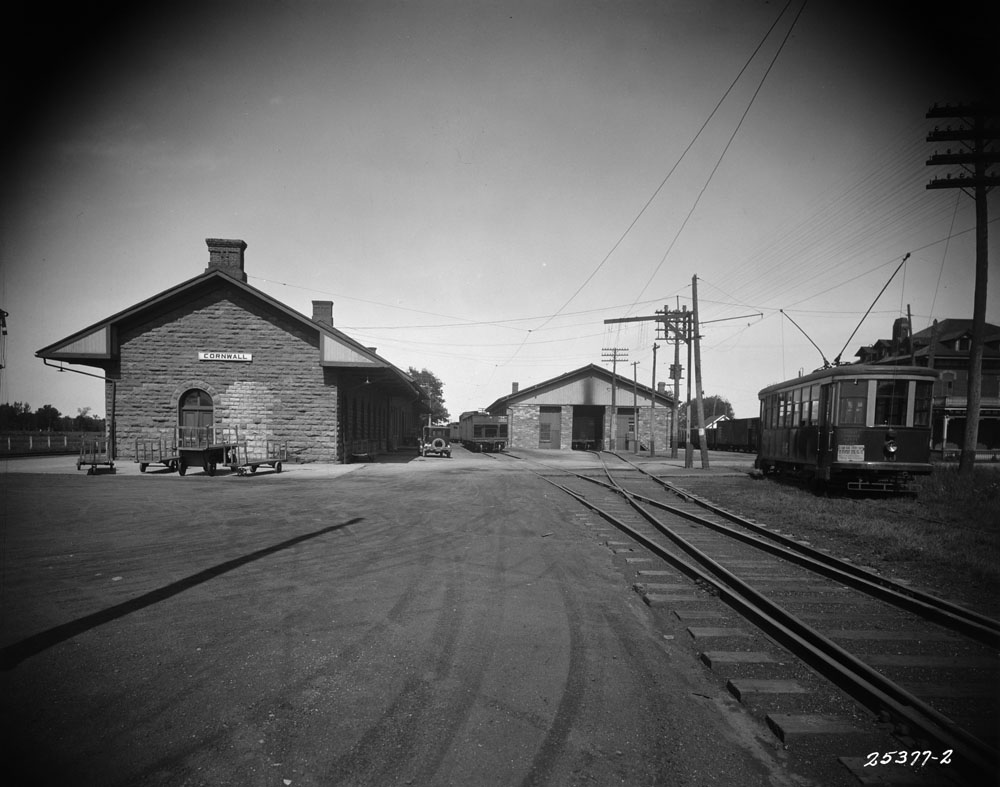
CNR railway station in Cornwall, 1926

Timeline of public transportation in Cornwall.

1896 to 1902 - Cornwall Electric Street Railway Company
1902 to 1970 - Cornwall Street Railway, Light and Power Company, Limited
1971 to current - Cornwall Transit

== See also ==
- Public transport in Canada
