= Corporatization =

Transformation of publicly owned or governmental organizations into business corporations

Corporatization is the process of transforming and restructuring state assets, government agencies, public organizations, or municipal organizations into corporations. It involves the adoption and application of business management practices and the separation of ownership from management through the creation of a joint-stock or shareholding structure for the organization. The result of corporatization is the creation of state-owned corporations (or corporations at other government levels, such as municipally owned corporations) where the government retains a majority ownership of the corporation's stock. Corporatization is undertaken to improve efficiency of an organization, to commercialize its operations, to introduce corporate and business management techniques to public functions, or as a precursor to partial or full privatization.

== History ==
The move towards neoliberal economic reform and New Public Management public service reform in the 1980s led to privatization of public functions in many countries. Corporatization was seen as a half-way house on the road to privatization. These state-owned enterprises are organized in the same manner as private corporations, with the difference that the company's shares remain in the ownership of the state and are not traded on the stock market. Corporatization is today often seen as an end in itself in order to introduce autonomy in organizations, hoping that this brings efficiency gains.

The People's Republic of China implemented a large scale restructuring of state enterprises starting in the reform and opening up that started in 1978, where state enterprises were granted greater autonomy in their operations from economy-wide state planning. This culminated in a massive wave of corporatization between 1992 and 2002 with the adoption of a market economy and the opening of the Shenzhen and Shanghai stock exchanges. Corporatization involved restructuring state enterprises to operate as commercial and market entities while retaining state ownership or majority state ownership.

Some argue that the trend towards corporatization has sped up due to the financial crisis, although there is evidence that there has been a trend towards corporatization since at least the start of the century.

== Reasons and effects ==
Corporatization can be used to improve efficiency of public service delivery (with mixed successes), as a step towards (partial) privatization, or to alleviate fiscal stress.

=== (Potentially) improving efficiency ===
A key purpose of corporatization is externalization. The effect of corporatization has been to convert state departments (or municipal services) into public companies and interpose commercial boards of directors between the shareholding ministers / city council and the management of the enterprises. Such externalization creates legal and managerial autonomy from politicians, which could potentially increase efficiency, as it safeguards the firm from political exploitation. However, corporatization can also fail to bring efficiency (or cause inefficiency), because this autonomy reduces the government's ability to monitor its management. Whether corporatization is beneficial may depend on the nature of the service that is corporatized, where autonomy may be less beneficial for more politicized and complex services.

=== Step towards privatization or hybridization ===
Although corporatization is to be distinguished from privatization (the former involves publicly owned corporations, the latter privately owned ones), once a service has been corporatised it is often relatively easy to privatise or part-privatise it, for example by selling some or all of the company's shares via the stock market. In some cases (e.g. the Netherlands in regard to water supply) there are laws to prevent this. Corporatization also can be a step towards the creation of hybrid forms of organization, such as institutional public-private partnerships or inter-municipal service organizations.

=== Alleviate fiscal stress ===
Corporatization is also a means to alleviate fiscal stress, as corporations can become standalone organizations that do not count towards municipalities' budgets.

== Prevalence ==
Corporatization of state enterprises and collectively owned enterprises was a major component of the economic restructuring program of formerly communist nations, most notably the People's Republic of China. China's contemporary socialist market economy is based on a corporatized state sector where state companies are owned by the central government but managed in a semi-autonomous fashion. Corporatization has also been used in New Zealand and most states of Australia in the reform of their electricity markets, as well as in many other countries and industries (e.g. Dutch water supply companies).

== Major areas ==
=== National level ===
On a national scale, major areas of services which have been corporatized in the past include:

- National railroads, the initial impetus to corporatization of functions that had belonged to national and local governing bodies began in the sphere of national railroad construction in the mid-19th century.
- Corporatized highways, for example toll roads.
- Corporatized electricity
- Telecommunications

=== Local level ===
On a local scale, major areas of services which have been corporatized include:

- Corporatized water, for example, the Dutch water supply companies are publicly owned corporations (mostly by municipalities, but also by regional governments). For involvement of private corporations in water supply, see water industry and water privatization.
- Bus services
- Refuse collection
- Housing development
- State employment services
- Theaters and cultural institutions

== See also ==
- Corporatism
- Corporation
- Corporatocracy
- Corporate capitalism
- Liberalization
- Marketization
- Municipal corporation
- Municipally owned corporation
- Nationalization
- Neoliberalism
- Outsourcing
- Public ownership
- Publicly traded company
- Privatization
- Socialist market economy
- State capitalism
- State-owned enterprise

Examples:

- New Zealand electricity market
