= Francis Clemow =

Canadian politician

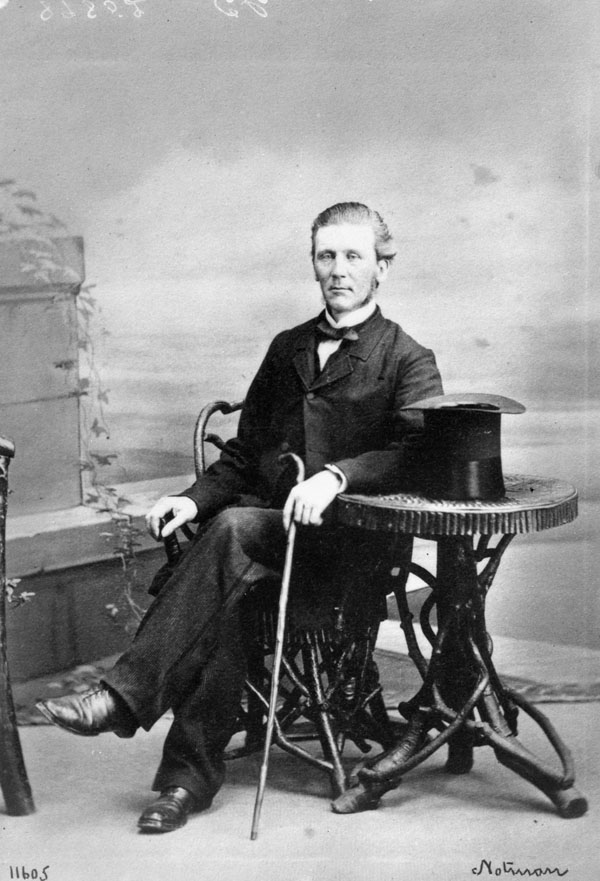
Francis Clemow Source: Library and Archives Canada

Francis Clemow (May 4, 1821 – May 28, 1902) was a merchant and political figure in Ontario, Canada. He sat for Rideau division in the Senate of Canada from 1885 to 1902.

He was born in Trois-Rivières, Lower Canada, the son of John Clemow, and was educated at Upper Canada College in Toronto. In 1841, Clemow came to Ottawa. He was involved for a time in the forwarding business and later operated as an assignee under the Insolvency Act. He married Margaret Powell in 1847. Clemow was a director of the Ottawa Electric Company and manager of the Ottawa Gas Works. He served two years on Ottawa City council and was chairman of the Board of Water Commissioners. He was grand master for the Orange Lodge of Carleton County. Clemow died in office at the age of 81.

Clemow Avenue in The Glebe neighbourhood of Ottawa was named in his honour.
