= Cornwall Electric =

Electricity utility in Ontario, Canada

Coordinates: 45.03086°N 74.73309°W

Cornwall Street Railway Light and Power Company Limited
- Trade name: Cornwall Electric
- Type: Subsidiary
- Industry: Electricity distribution
- Predecessors: Cornwall Electric Street Railway Company Limited; Cornwall Street Railway Company; Stormont Electric Light and Power Company
- Founded: 1887; 139 years ago in Cornwall, Ontario
- Founder: Wilbur Reuben Hitchcock
- Headquarters: Cornwall, Ontario
- Areas served: Akwesasne; Cornwall; South Glengarry; South Stormont
- Key people: Jacqueline Baird (Regional, Manager)
- Services: Electric power distribution
- Owner: Fortis Inc.
- Number of employees: 50 full-time (2022)
- Parent: FortisOntario Inc.
- Website: cornwallelectric.com

Cornwall Street Railway Light and Power Company Limited, operating as Cornwall Electric, is an electricity transmission and distribution utility, licensed by the Ontario Energy Board (OEB) to operate in Cornwall, Ontario, Canada. Originally established in 1887 as the Stormont Electric Light and Power Company and merged with the Cornwall Electric Street Railway Company in 1905, it is one of the oldest utilities in Canada.

The company supplies electricity to approximately 25,365 customers in the city of Cornwall, the townships of South Glengarry and South Stormont, and on a portion of the Mohawk people's territory of Akwesasne, all located in Eastern Ontario. It crosses provincial boundaries to obtain the bulk of the power it requires directly from Hydro-Québec, while generating a small amount of its own, using a cogeneration system, a first such use in Canada.

Thomas Edison visited Cornwall in 1883 to see his electric incandescent light system illuminate a local factory. The incorporation of the Stormont Electric Light and Power Company followed in 1887. Since then, the company has undergone several ownership changes during its history, transitioning from a private company to a municipally owned utility to one that is owned and operated by a multinational publicly traded company.

== History ==
=== Name ===
Cornwall Electric is the amalgamation of two companies that were first established in the late 19th century in Cornwall, Ontario, Canada. Stormont Electric Light & Power Company, which was formed in 1887 to supply Cornwall with electric light, and the Cornwall Electric Street Railway Company, which incorporated in 1896 after receiving a franchise to operate a street car service in Cornwall.

In 1905, the two businesses merged under the name Cornwall Street Railway Light and Power Company Limited, which was a combination of the two original business names. Even though the company eventually divested itself of all of its railroad operations, it has retained its full corporate name.

In 1972, the company branded itself with the orange "CE" logo and continued doing business as Cornwall Electric. While the company was attempting to incorporate provincially using the name Cornwall Electric, a newer company which manufactured small electric appliances, was also incorporating federally with the same name. Executives from both companies held meetings and made arrangements that allowed the utility, which had proceeded further in obtaining the name, to continue operating as Cornwall Electric. It agreed to provide the other firm with compensation for any problems that arose after it decided to forgo the use of the name Cornwall Electric in lieu of another.

=== Early years ===
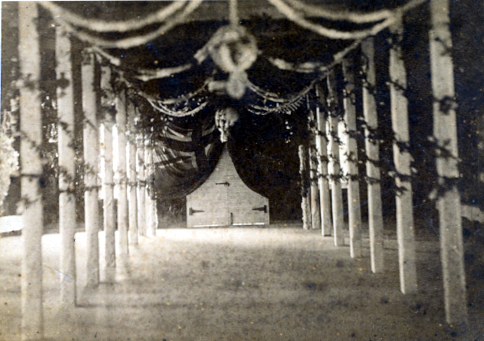
Edison lights in weave shed in 1883

In the early 1880s, the owners of the Canada Cotton Manufacturing Company invited employees of Thomas Edison to Cornwall, to install the inventor's direct current (DC) system of incandescent lights, to illuminate their new weaving shed. H.M. Billsby, director of the project, hired local Cornwall workers, including John MacMillan and Wilbur Reuben (W.R.) Hitchcock, who installed six boilers, six generators, and one hundred carbon filament bulbs connected in series and suspended from the shed's ceiling. Edison himself went to Cornwall on April 4, 1883, for the weaving shed's opening, as did politicians, scientists, industrial leaders, and dignitaries. He activated the system and saw for the first time in Canada, factory illumination using his patented invention of electric incandescent lights. This was a significant development in the utilisation of electricity in industrial and commercial applications.

John MacMillan was placed in charge of the generators at the textile mill by H.M. Billsby, and after two years there, he went on to install generators at various locations for the Edison Company, which became part of the General Electric Company. He returned to Cornwall to work for Stormont Electric before purchasing his own electric shop.

W.R. Hitchcock, who in 1883 at the age of twenty-one, moved to Cornwall from Massena, New York, worked as an electrician for the Edison Company for a few years, and later joined Billsby who became the first manager of the Westinghouse Electric Company. He became a partner at the construction firm Glover, Davis and Hitchcock of New York, installing plants for Westinghouse that produced electricity using an alternating current (AC), which allowed it to travel longer distances, compared to Edison's DC system.

During a visit to his Cornwall home, Hitchcock convinced a group of local businessmen and the directors of Stormont Electric to invest in an electric company that made use of the Westinghouse system. His company reached a formal agreement with them on April 19, 1887, to install 650 incandescent electric lamps on the streets of Cornwall. The directors of Stormont Electric had agreed to use their influence to secure tax exemptions for the power plant, a right-of-way for Hitchcock's company to string wires on poles throughout the town, and to obtain a right-of-way from the federal government to lay wires across the Cornwall Canal.

=== Incorporation ===
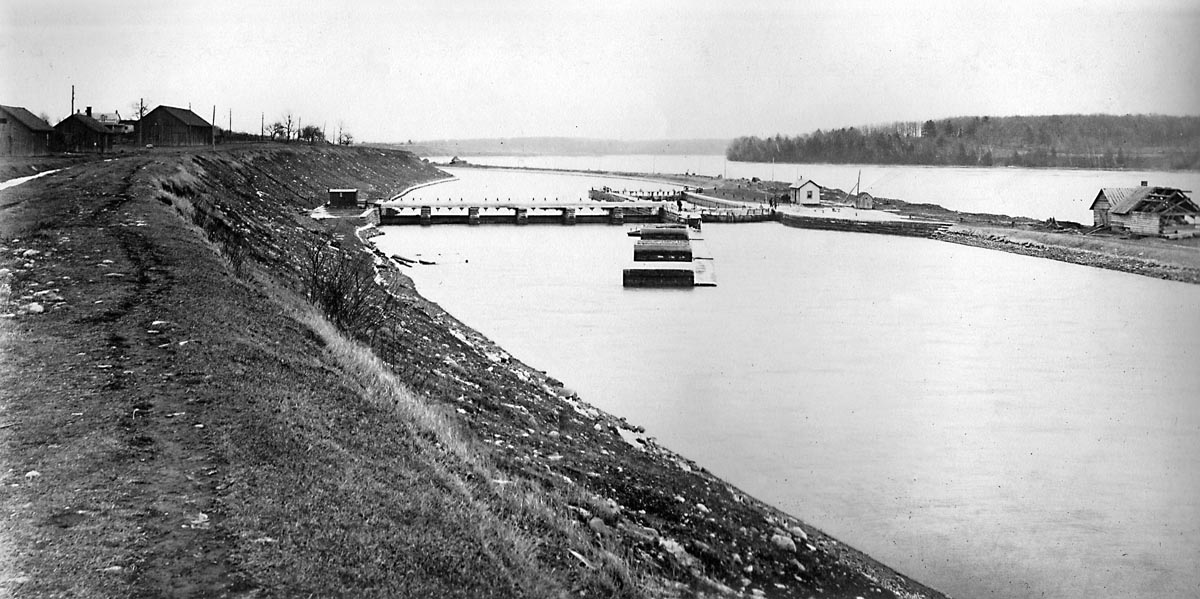
Cornwall Canal circa 1904

As requested by Stormont Electric, the town council passed a by-law on April 22, 1887, to give the company the exclusive right to erect poles and string wires for the distribution of electricity across the town for fifteen years and a tax exemption on the personal and real property of the company for a period of ten years. Stormont Electric then filed for incorporation with the provincial government as a joint-stock company, valued at $25,000. Company solicitors also prepared a deed of purchase for the use of the water-power plant in a building on land used for a gristmill, controlled by David Hodge. It was passed on to him by his father Andrew Hodge, who years earlier, purchased the mill, which included federal water rights on the Cornwall Canal.

In September 1887, Hitchcock obtained title to his company's electric plant and agreed to operate it for one year and to give the directors of Stormont Electric options to purchase the operation before being free to sell it to anyone else. In October of that year, Hitchcock borrowed $5,000 from them to pay his bills, and unable to repay the ten-month loan, he forfeited ownership of his power plant to Stormont Electric.

=== Expansion and control ===
On December 1, 1893, the directors of Stormont Electric decided to operate the Cornwall Gas Works Company, when the shareholders, seeing it as a potential rival, had agreed to purchase the company. After being in abeyance for several years, the High Court of Justice for Ontario issued a final order of foreclosure on April 13, 1890. Once the terms and conditions of the purchase were finalized, Stormont Electric purchased the company in 1895, for $13,000. An Act that passed in the provincial legislature of Ontario provided Stormont Electric with the necessary permission to operate Cornwall Gas Works, allowing it to manufacture and sell gas for light, power, and heat in the town and township of Cornwall and to increase the value of its capital stock by $50,000.

Facing an increasing demand for electricity, the directors of Stormont Electric decided to build a new coal-powered steam plant to supply power when the Cornwall Canal had an insufficient amount of water to turn the water wheels fast enough to generate electricity. To finance the project, which included a new boiler, engine house, and approximately 150 tons of soft coal to power the steam engines, the directors secured a $10,000 loan against the company's property and equipment from James N. Stuart, an investment agent from Montreal, Quebec.

During the 1896 yearly municipal elections, the incumbent mayoral candidate M. M. Mulhern had proposed expropriation of the water and electric utilities. Stormont Electric was able to escape the idea of expropriation, which had been deemed inappropriate at the time by William Hodge, a candidate for Reeve and a former director of Stormont Electric.

Five years later, in 1901, Cornwall had assumed control of the waterworks and formed a special investigative committee to determine whether it would be more economical to build a new electric plant or acquire the gas and electric plants operated by Stormont Electric. After receiving the committee's report, which favoured purchasing the two plants, the town council provided Stormont Electric with a formal offer to purchase the plants and related assets for $50,000 on November 27, 1901, giving the directors one month to decide before withdrawing the offer. The offer was declined, and to show its displeasure, the town council decided not to renew the agreement it already had with Stormont Electric and instead placed the street lighting services it provided up for tender.

To help with the planning, specifications, and bid proposals, the town council enlisted the services of W.R. Hitchcock. Cornwall Electric Street Railway, which also produced electricity, did not bid on the tender. It was reorganizing itself and facing a corporate takeover by the Sun Life Assurance Company of Canada, which did not want to participate in the tendering process. The remaining bids were from Stormont Electric and St. Lawrence Power Company, with the latter having strong connections with the federal Conservative government, which had awarded it lucrative contracts, including one to bring power to the Cornwall Canal to operate the locks and to furnish it with lights. After much deliberation and finding the St. Lawrence bid too high and reluctant to build a new plant, the town council reversed itself by signing a ten-year contract with Cornwall Electric on June 4, 1902.

To support its growth, Stormont Electric also signed a contract to purchase additional power from St. Lawrence Power on October 26, 1903, which included an agreement to build a power step-down transformer station on its property south of the Cornwall Canal and a commitment from St. Lawrence Power that it would not supply power to individuals or corporations in Cornwall, excluding the Canadian Coloured Cotton Mills, and to not supply power to villages surrounding Cornwall.

== Railway operations ==
=== Cornwall Street Railway Company ===
The Cornwall Street Railway Company was the first attempt at providing Cornwall with public transportation when it was incorporated by letters patent on November 11, 1885, and received a charter from the town to build tram lines for horse-drawn streetcars, however no evidence could be found to indicate that the company had ever started offering its railway service.

=== Cornwall Electric Street Railway Company Limited ===
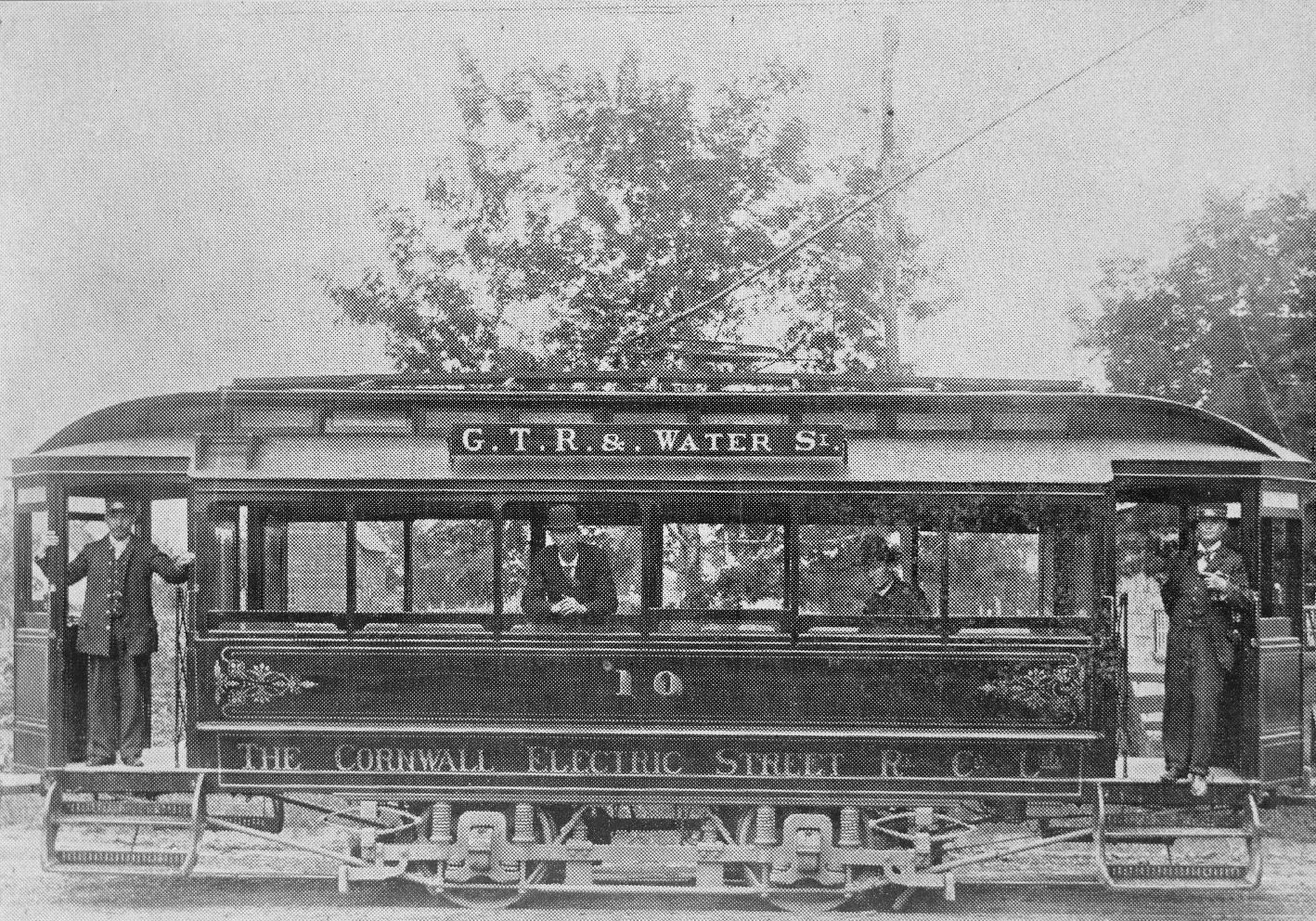
Cornwall Electric Street Railway car

On January 22, 1894, W.R. Hitchcock took the initial steps to bring to Cornwall an electric street railway for which he received franchises from the town and township of Cornwall. Inexperienced in the matters of building a railway, Hitchcock signed an agreement with the firm Hooper and Starr to build it. The contractors became principal stockholders and directors of the railway, after Hitchcock transferred his franchise rights in January 1896, to the newly formed Cornwall Electric Street Railway Company Limited, where he became superintendent.

Cornwall Electric started its passenger streetcar service on July 1, 1896, using an electric locomotive to pull four cars travelling on approximately 4.8 kilometres (3.0 mi) of track, and purchased two additional cars in 1897.

In need of additional revenues, Cornwall Electric started a freight service, for which it purchased two new freight locomotives in 1899. The service moved freight from the Grand Trunk Railway yards and from the New York and Ottawa Railway to the Toronto Paper Company, Canadian Coloured Cottons, and other businesses, including moving mail for the town's post office. It ended its streetcar service, switching instead to trolleybus service in 1949.

During the time Stormont Electric was planning to expand its operation, Cornwall Electric Street Railway included in its charter the right to generate electricity for heating, lighting and power. The company was looking for ways to turn its financial difficulties around. Although it was not in a position to compete against Stormont Electric, its general manager David Starr was contemplating purchasing the company, in order to power its streetcar service with electricity that was not being used during the day.

In a 1970 Act of the Legislative Assembly of the Province of Ontario, Cornwall Electric received authorization to sell the railway freight operations, including equipment, buildings, tracks, and lands with rights-of-way. The Canadian National Railway purchased the freight operations on April 1, 1971 for $430,000. The passenger service was contracted out to A.J. McDonald Limited.

== Power sources and growth ==
=== Ontario Hydro ===
Like many municipalities in Ontario, Cornwall was tempted in 1912 to join the new provincial publicly owned Ontario Hydro. Enticed by the promise of lower rates and "people's power" to join the public utility, residents were unswayed. Between 1919 and 1920, pro-Hydro and anti-Hydro forces engaged in many heated discussions. Some had seen Ontario Hydro as becoming a huge monopoly, initially offering lower rates, but not maintaining them. The debates culminated into a referendum, whereby the ratepayers of Cornwall in a 799 to 540 vote, enacted a by-law to renew the company's franchise, keeping the utility under local control and in private hands for another ten years. This provided Cornwall with stable rates, while all the Hydro-towns were subjected to rate increases. Unlike Cornwall, they were unable to choose another provider of electricity once connected to the public grid.

It was later revealed that Adam Beck, former chairman of the Hydro-Electric Power Commission (HEPC), who had unsuccessfully tried to convince the citizens of Cornwall to switch to Ontario Hydro, used his influence and the strength of his position to offer the Eugene Phillips Electric Company a more favourable electricity rate if it relocated to the public-Hydro town of Brockville, Ontario, instead of Cornwall, during the time the company was negotiating with Cornwall's Board of Trade and town council. Cornwall Mayor Chisholm and council were outraged and appealed to the provincial government, which, after receiving other complaints, established the Gregory Royal Commission to investigate the HEPC. In this regard, the Commission found that HEPC had improperly contributed $805 of public funds to the pro-Hydro Citizens League, had discriminated against Cornwall, and had made arrangements to shut Cornwall out of getting an independent source of power, which it deemed to be "coercion of a character seldom adopted by a public body".

Cornwall Electric aggressively promoted its electrical businesses. In 1920, Cornwall had only four electric ranges, and by 1930, ownership had increased to 800 electric ranges. Similar electric appliance initiatives raised resentment from private appliance dealers in places that were connected to the publicly owned Ontario Hydro. It also sold electric hot water heaters with off-meter electricity, paid for using a flat-rate system that it could turn on and off remotely during peak hours. The sale of hot water heaters and electric appliances were eventually abandoned, and the flat-rate system discontinued.

=== St. Lawrence Power ===
The St. Lawrence Power Company was established by Michael Patrick Davis of Ottawa, Ontario. It was granted a federal charter and given broad powers in an Act of Parliament which received Royal Assent on May 23, 1901. In early 1907, Davis sold the company to the Pittsburgh Reduction Company in Philadelphia, which later became the Aluminum Company of America (ALCOA). It established an aluminum plant and formed the St. Lawrence River Power Company of New York State to build a power house for it in Massena. A few years later, the company directors who saw the potential of the St. Lawrence River and the Long Sault Rapids, formed the Long Sault Development Company and expanded its holdings by acquiring large sections of land in Canada to further their interest in the electricity business, which they believed could rival Niagara Falls.

As opposition to all developments in the St. Lawrence grew stronger, the Government of Canada formed in 1912 a Commission of Conservation to review the Long Sault Rapids, the St. Lawrence River, and all that it entailed. In its report, it stated, "That it is the plain duty of Canada... to maintain her rights of ownership and jurisdiction absolutely unimpaired and untrammelled." It became clear that private corporations would not be permitted to control the development of the St. Lawrence River.

By the 1920s, Stormont Electric had become more dependent on the power it purchased from St. Lawrence Power, and eventually relegated its own power house to backup service only, which it operated on its property located on the south side of the Cornwall Canal and where St. Lawrence Power had installed a step-down substation. Cornwall Electric later decided to move its power house to the north side of the canal on the railway car barn property it expanded with the 1934 purchase of the adjacent lot, eliminating the need of stringing and maintaining wires across the canal bed.

=== Aluminum Company of America ===
Unlike most towns during the depression years of the 1930s, Cornwall was facing industrial expansion and population growth, increasing the demand for more power by 300 percent. Cornwall Electric obtained all its power from St. Lawrence Power, which received its power from the Cedars Rapids Transmission Co. Ltd., which primarily supplied power to its then parent company ALCOA which operated the aluminum smelter located in Massena. Under an 85-year contract that extended to the year 2000, Cedar Rapids agreed to purchase 56,000 kW of power from Hydro-Québec, and if available, could purchase an additional 50,000 kW. It also had a license from the Government of Canada to export 75,000 kW of surplus power at the entry point of Massena, for its aluminum plant. The Niagara Mohawk Power Corporation, also based out of New York State, and by then owners of St. Lawrence Power, had agreed to provide up to 56,000 kW of power at Massena, if Cedar Rapids, fulfilling purchases made by St. Lawrence Power to service the Cornwall area, was unable to meet the power needed at the ALCOA plant.

=== Saint Lawrence Seaway ===
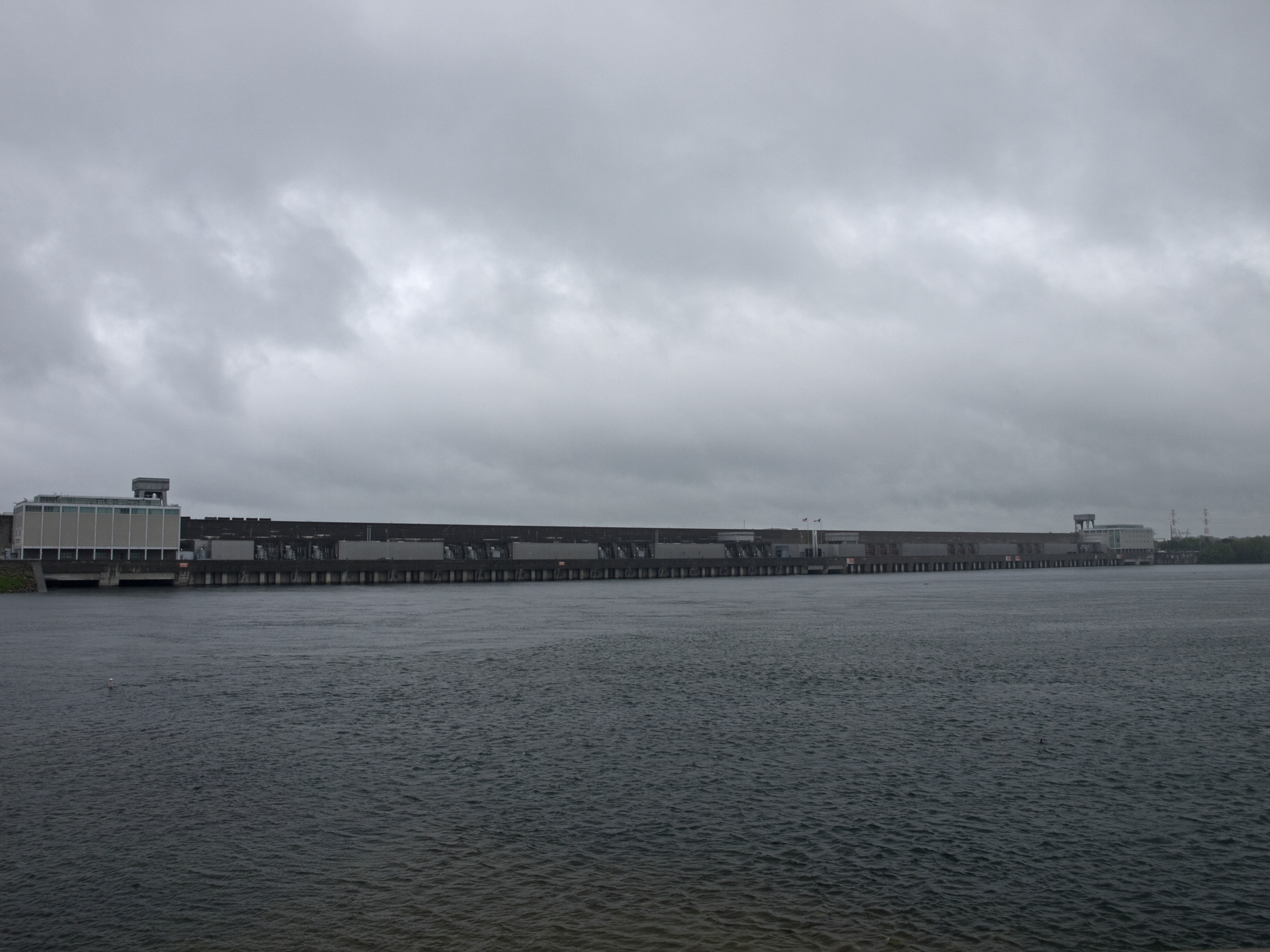
Moses-Saunders Power Dam

The Moses-Saunders Power Dam, a part of the Saint Lawrence Seaway which was completed in 1959, and which is situated on the west side of Cornwall on the Saint Lawrence River, supplies water to two adjacent Canada-US hydroelectric power generating stations, operated by Ontario Power Generation (OPG) and the New York Power Authority. Cornwall Electric does not purchase any power generated there, due in part to a long-standing Ontario Hydro policy of not supplying power long-term to privately held companies, and the affordability and abundance of power available close by in the neighbouring province of Quebec.

=== Cedars Rapids Transmission ===
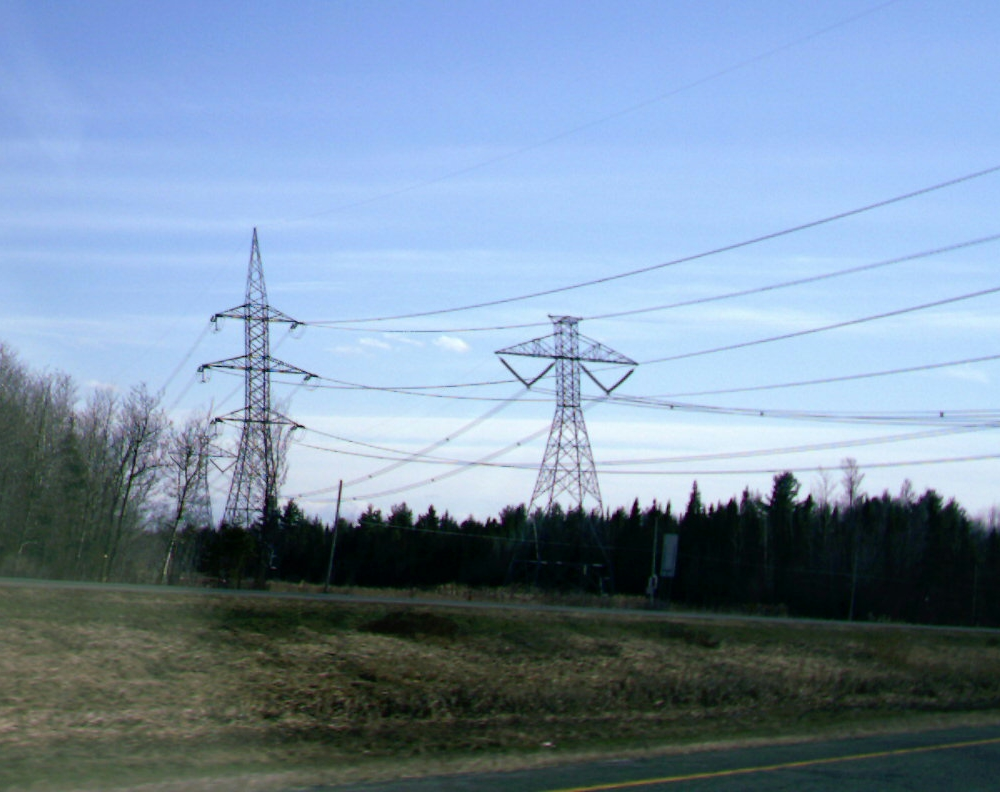
Hydro-Québec high tension lines

In 1980, Cornwall Electric and St. Lawrence Power had approached ALCOA to discuss the possibility of purchasing Cedar Rapids, but after only agreeing to consider the matter, nothing came of it until 1983, when Cedar Rapids decided to terminate the contract it had with St. Lawrence Power to pursue other alternatives. After this, the Cornwall Electric board of directors hired the firm Touche Ross to prepare a feasibility study on purchasing both St. Lawrence Power and Cedar Rapids. After recommending that it should, General Manager Gordon Fairweather and the board of directors once again approached ALCOA in early 1984. This time, a committee was struck which negotiated until early 1985.

In July 1985, ALCOA announced that it had sold Cedars Rapids Transmission Company Limited to Hydro-Québec for an amount that ranged between 65 and $70 million. Hydro-Québec agreed to honour the contract Cedar Rapids had just renegotiated with St. Lawrence Power. Two years later, after three previous attempts, Cornwall Electric acquired the St. Lawrence Power Company from Niagara Mohawk Power for $13.5 million.

The Cedars Rapids Transmission line which crosses provincial and international boundaries feeds Cornwall Electric with the power it requires directly from Hydro-Québec. It is a 72-kilometre (45 mi) double-circuit 120-kilovolt (kV), 325-megawatt interconnection line. The line runs along its right-of-way, and links between the Hydro-Québec TransÉnergie grid at the Les Cèdres substation in Quebec, to the National Grid Dennison substation in the state of New York. The line was rebuilt in 2003 and operates at 120 kV. It is capable of operating at 230 kV with a capacity of 1,000 megawatts.

=== Energy dependence ===
In 1994, Cornwall Electric, concerned about its energy dependence on just one supplier, awarded a contract to Marsh Energy Inc. to design the first municipally owned hot water district heating and cogeneration system in Canada. The plant went online in 1995 and is operated by CDH District Heating Limited, a subsidiary of FortisOntario Inc. The system feeds 5 megawatts electric (MWe) of base load electricity into the municipal grid, and provides 7 megawatts thermal heat (MWth) to city buildings, schools, and a hospital via a 4.5-kilometre (2.8 mi) underground distribution network.

== Ownership ==
=== Sun Life Assurance of Canada ===
As early as 1898, the Sun Life Assurance Company of Canada had begun to purchase bonds issued to Cornwall Electric Street Railway. Cornwall Electric was in financial trouble and was unable to repay those bonds, giving Sun Life, ownership of the railway company in 1902.

In December 1904, James Leitch, president of Stormont Electric received a letter from Sun Life expressing its desire to purchase the company. The directors, all prominent businessmen and active members of the community, who had previously refused the town's offer of $50,000, accepted in 1905, Sun Life's offer to purchase the company's stock valued at $37,100. Sun Life consolidated the two operations, sharing management and overhead costs, and using its electricity to power the streetcar services, and to distribute it to consumers. It made William Hodge, a former director of Stormont Electric, and familiar with the town's people, the first general manager of the combined companies, and who later became the first vice-president.

=== Corporation of the City of Cornwall ===
By the early 1970s, Sun Life began to slowly divest itself of Cornwall Electric's railway assets. In 1972, the Kingston, Ontario firm Klondike and Lemoyne Company Limited showed interest in purchasing Cornwall Electric, and when negotiations took a more serious turn, Sun Life after seventy-five years of ownership and wanting to unload what remained of Cornwall Electric, advised Cornwall city council that it was planning to sell the company.

The city council, under the leadership of Mayor Gerald Parisien, announced on June 30, 1977, that it sent Sun Life, a letter of intent to purchase the company with an offer of $4.8 million, under a deadline of July 25, 1977. On the condition that the terms of sale be finalized by that deadline, Sun Life accepted the offer. Later that year, the city of Cornwall appointed members to its first board of directors. They were Mayor Gerald Parisien, who also served as president, Albert Bergeron, owner of Bergeron Electric, Fred Bradley, former comptroller at the local textile plant Courtaulds (Canada) Limited, Neil Burke, President of the local car dealership Brookshell Pontiac Buick, and Douglas Fawthrop, former city alderman. Gordon Fairweather remained as vice-president and general manager.

=== Consumers' Gas Company Ltd. ===
In an attempt to lower electricity rates, the Government of Ontario had proposed legislation that would restructure the electricity market in the province. The Cornwall Electric board of directors concerned with the possible adverse impact this could have on the company, presented options to city council. Viewing privatization as the best option, council quietly sought a buyer for the company. After several months of searching, it found one that was eager to be first in the new electricity market and willing to pay twice the company's value to acquire Cornwall Electric.

In 1997, after twenty years of ownership, city council announced that it had made the decision to sell Cornwall Electric to Consumers' Gas Company Ltd. Residents concerned with that decision and who saw Cornwall Electric as the city's "crown jewel", formed an organization called Cornwall Ratepayers Against Panic-selling of Cornwall Electric (CRAP). A proponent of the organization was a former Cornwall mayor, Nick Kaneb. Despite the opposition, city council voted in a 10-1 decision to sign a memorandum of understanding. On behalf of the Corporation for the City of Cornwall, it accepted the offer from Consumers Gas to purchase Cornwall Electric for $68 million.

At a commemoration twenty-one years after the sale, Ernie Jackson, general manager of Cornwall Electric at the time, recollected that the company was entering a time of high risk, and recognized that it was a good idea to put control of Cornwall Electric into private hands, where its mission could be solely on keeping it profitable.

=== Fortis Inc. ===
In May 2002, Enbridge Energy Distribution Inc. (formerly Consumers' Gas), announced that it had agreed to sell Cornwall Electric to Fortis Inc. in a cash deal worth $67 million. Both the Canadian Competition Bureau and the Ontario Energy Board approved the sale which Fortis Inc. concluded on October 18, 2002. Fortis has its roots in St. John's, Newfoundland, and is a Canadian multinational publicly traded holding company which operates Cornwall Electric under its Ontario subsidiary, FortisOntario Inc.

In 2016, Cornwall Electric entered into a ten-year agreement, commencing on January 1, 2020, with Hydro-Québec Energy Marketing, to purchase a minimum of 537 gigawatt hours (GWh) per year and up to 145 megawatts of capacity at any one time.

== Events ==
=== Ice storm ===
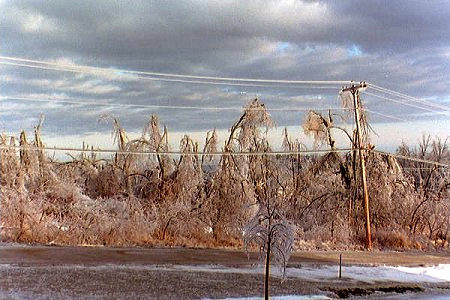
Ice Storm damage in 1998

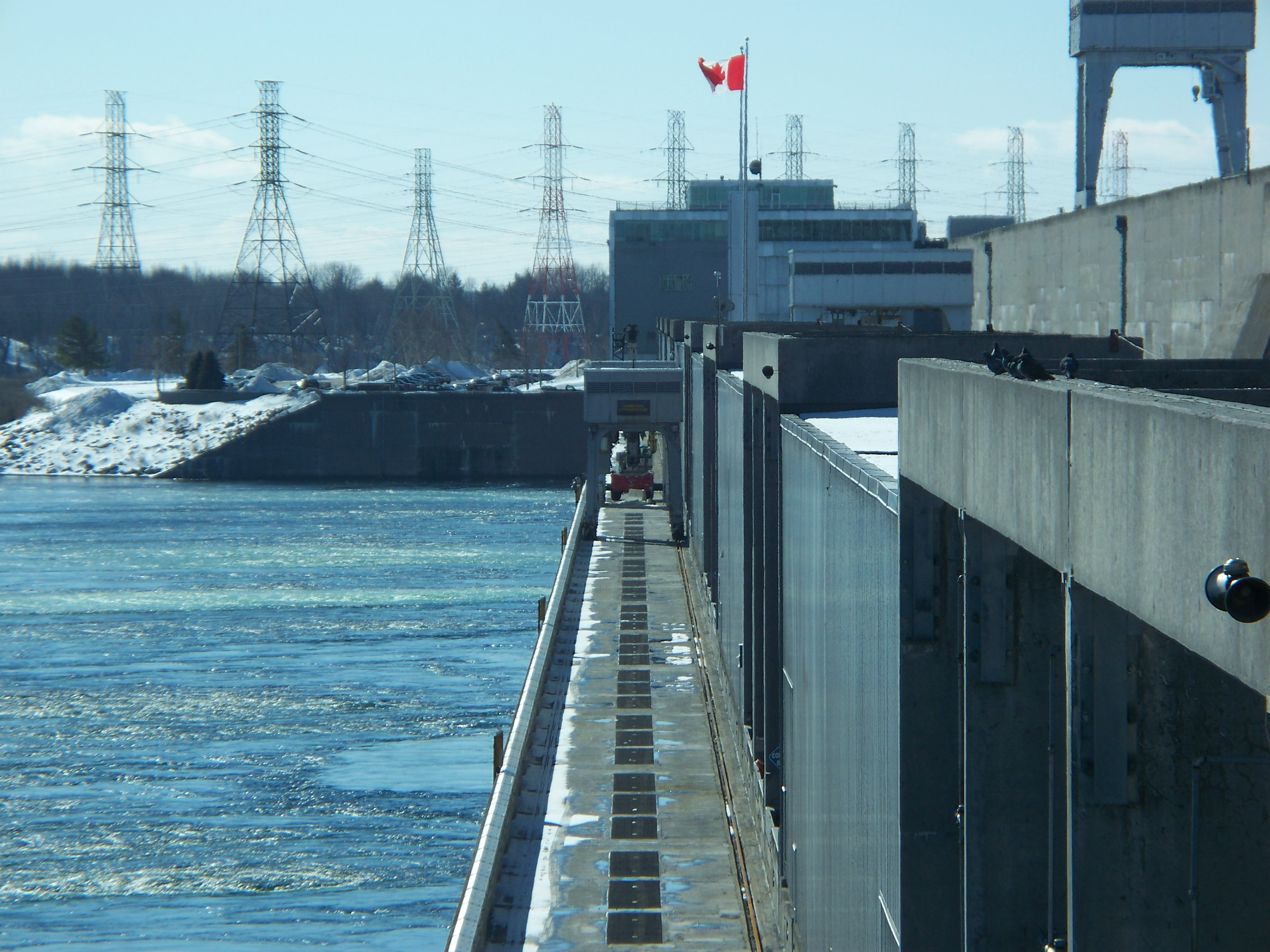
R.H. Saunders Power Dam

The sale of Cornwall Electric was set to occur in February 1998 but was delayed due to the January 1998 North American ice storm. During the prolonged ice storm, much of Eastern Ontario and Western Quebec was without electricity. Cornwall, which is situated on the banks of the Saint Lawrence River, which supplies water to the neighbouring hydroelectric R.H. Saunders Power Generating Station, also had no electricity, until existing wires connecting the Moses-Saunders Power Dam to Cornwall were for the first time energized with electricity generated by the local power plant. Two of the three wires were weighted down by ice and were hazardously close. A Cornwall Electric employee who was also an archer used a bow and arrow to throw a line over the arcing wires. Workers were then able to bounce the wires, causing the ice to fall off and the hydro lines to separate from each other. This provided Cornwall residents with enough power to meet 75% of their electricity needs during the ice storm.

=== Progress Fund ===
After paying off the city's debt with the sale of Cornwall Electric, the city of Cornwall created the Progress Fund with the remaining proceeds. It later protected the Fund by passing a by-law equipped with a funding mechanism requiring the fund to hold a minimum balance of $25 million. Originally, it only funded quality of life projects in the city of Cornwall. Interest generated by the Fund has been used in part for the redevelopment of the local Hotel Dieu Hospital, later renamed the Cornwall Community Hospital, the establishment of a hospice, the building of an aquatic centre, and to pay the mortgage on the city's new sports complex, the Benson Centre.

== Community involvement ==
Historically, many of the company's general managers and directors contributed to the future development of Cornwall by working with the local Board of Trade and town council. They encouraged Sun Life to invest in many large companies that would agree to locate to Cornwall. It financed the building of the Water Street Arena to replace the Victoria Rink which was lost in the Cornwall "great fire of 1933". Arrangements were also made to purchase the home of W.R. Hitchcock, founder of the Cornwall electric and railway companies who was at the time facing adversity. This allowed him to continue living there until his death on June 4, 1944.

== Licensing ==
Cornwall Street Railway Light and Power Company is registered as an Ontario Business Corporation, and has the Registry ID 752855, issued by the province of Ontario on January 1, 1988. Its Electricity Distribution Licence is ED-2004-0405 which was issued by the Ontario Energy Board on November 10, 2004, last amended on March 17, 2017, and valid until December 31, 2030.

Although licensed by the OEB, Cornwall Electric has been granted legislative exemptions by the provincial regulator under the 1998 Ontario Electricity Act. The company is subject to a 35-year franchise agreement with the city of Cornwall, which dates back to July 31, 1998. It also has franchise agreements with the neighbouring townships. Under the agreements, electricity rates are reset every year, and calculated based on a formula that includes adjustments for inflation, load growth, and customer growth. The company provides its electricity consumers with some of the lowest rates in Ontario. (Note: As of 2017, the Ontario Energy Board (OEB) no longer includes Cornwall, Ontario in its electricity rate comparison charts.)

== See also ==
- Cornwall, Ontario
- Cornwall Transit
- Moses-Saunders Power Dam
- R.H. Saunders Power Generating Station

== Footnotes and charts ==
- 2017 Ontario Energy Board Electricity Rate Comparison
- 2016 Ontario Energy Board Electricity Rate Comparison
