= Municipally owned corporation =

Company owned by a municipality

A municipally owned corporation is a corporation owned by a municipality. They are typically "organisations with independent corporate status, managed by an executive board appointed primarily by local government officials, and with majority public ownership." Some municipally owned corporations rely on revenue from user fees, distinguishing them from agencies and special districts funded through taxation. Municipally owned corporations may also differ from local bureaucracies in funding, transaction costs, financial scrutiny, labour rights, permission to operate outside their jurisdiction, and, under some circumstances, in rights to make profits and risk of bankruptcy.

The causes and effects of municipally owned corporations are posited to be different from those of state-owned enterprises. Corporatization may be more utilised locally rather than nationally allowing more hybrid or flexible forms of public service delivery such as public-private partnerships and inter-municipal cooperation. It also allows charging user fees. Effects can be different because of lower regulator expertise, lower contracting capacity for municipalities, and the higher presence of scale economies. Current research shows that municipally owned corporations are frequently more efficient than bureaucracy but have higher failure rates because of their legal and managerial autonomy. An additional problem is the fact that municipally owned corporations often have more than one municipal owner, and conflict between municipal owners can lead to reduced output for the municipally owned corporation due to various negative spillovers.

== Background ==
Under New Public Management, corporatization became prominent as a step towards (partial) privatization. It soon became an end in itself, aiming to combine government control with efficient, businesslike service delivery that was considered lacking in bureaucratic service delivery. The state-owned enterprises that resulted were to be organized akin to private corporations, with the difference that the company's shares remain state ownership are not traded on the stock market.

This also became a trend at the local level. Municipal corporation followed a process of externalization that required new skills and orientations from the respective local governments, and followed common changes in the institutional landscape of public services. There was a substantial growth in the number of municipally owned corporations in the 1990s and 2000s throughout Europe and the United States.

== Reasons and effects ==
Municipal corporatization can be used to improve efficiency of public service delivery (with mixed successes) or as a step towards (partial) privatization or hybridization. Its reasons and effects are somewhat similar as those of corporatization.

=== (Potentially) improving efficiency ===
A key purpose of corporatization is externalization. Such externalization gives the service delivery organization legal and managerial autonomy from politicians, which could potentially increase efficiency, because it safeguards the firm from political exploitation. However, it can also fail to bring efficiency (or cause inefficiency), because this autonomy also reduces the government's ability to monitor its management. Whether corporatization is beneficial may depend on the nature of the service that is corporatized, where autonomy may be less beneficial for more politicized and complex services. At the local level there may also be higher transaction costs, because contracting capacity may be lower.

=== Step towards privatization or hybridization ===
Once a service has been corporatised, it is often relatively easy to (partially) privatise it by selling some or all of the company's shares via the stock market. Thus corporatisation can be a stop on the way towards (partial) privatization. Corporatization also can be a step towards the creation of hybrid forms of organization, such as institutional private-partnerships or inter-municipal service organizations, which are especially relevant at the local level because of opportunities to capture scale economies.

=== Alleviating fiscal stress ===
Municipal corporations tend to be established by local governments experiencing some degree of fiscal stress. Corporatization was a way to allow local governments to "hide their liabilities by allocating them partly to their companies" or "corporatized their utilities (…) to raise new sources of income from their companies."

== Problems with multiple ownership ==
The frequent ownership of municipally owned corporations by multiple municipalities can cause problems, the so-called multiple principal problem, that can lead these to be inefficient, inequitable, or unaccountable or have high failure rates. There can be free-riding or duplication in steering and monitoring procedures, resulting in high costs. If there is heterogeneity in interests between the multiple municipalities, there may be directive ambiguity or lobbying of the corporations by individual municipalities, leading to high inefficiency and low accountability. Delegating governance to one elected party may be a way to solve this problem.

== Usage ==
Municipal corporatization is more prominent for some services than for others. It is typically prominent in:

- Water management
- Bus services
- Refuse collection
- Economy & Housing
- Social Affairs & Employment
- Education & Culture

== See also ==
- Corporatization
- New Public Management
