= List of generating stations in New Brunswick =

Map of all generating stations in New Brunswick

This is a list of electrical generating stations in New Brunswick, Canada.

New Brunswick has a diversified electric supply mix of fuel oil, hydroelectric, nuclear, diesel, coal, natural gas, wind, and biomass power stations. NB Power, the government-owned, integrated public utility is the main power generator in the province. There is a total of 4,388 MW of generation capacity listed here, with 47% of that capacity in the Saint John region in four stations.

Energy capacity by source in NB
1. Fossil fuel (53.8%)
2. Hydro (21.9%)
3. Nuclear (15.2%)
4. Other renewables (9.2%)

== Non-renewable ==
=== Fossil fuel ===
List of all power stations using fossil fuel in New Brunswick.

Name	Location	Capacity (MW)	Date	Owner	Type	Ref
Bayside Generating Station	Saint John	277	1999	NB Power	Natural gas	
Belledune Generating Station	Belledune	467	1993	NB Power	Coal	
Coleson Cove Generating Station	Saint John	972	1976	NB Power	Fuel oil	
Grand Manan Generating Station	Grand Manan	29	1989	NB Power	Diesel	
Millbank Generating Station	Millbank	397	1991	NB Power	Diesel	
Sainte-Rose Generating Station	Sainte-Rose	99	1991	NB Power	Diesel	
Grandview Cogeneration Plant	Saint John	95	2004	TransCanada	Natural gas	

=== Nuclear ===
List of all nuclear power stations in New Brunswick.

Name	Location	Capacity (MW)	Date	Owner	Ref
Point Lepreau Nuclear Generating Station	45°04′10″N 66°27′20″W	660	1983	NB Power	

== Renewable ==
=== Hydro ===
List of all hydroelectric generating stations in New Brunswick.

Name	Location	River	Capacity (MW)	Commission Date	Owner	Ref
Beechwood Generating Station	46.542253°N 67.669276°W	Saint John River	112	1962	NB Power	
Grand Falls Generating Station	47.0500811°N 67.7425575°W	Saint John River	66	1931	NB Power	
Hargrove Dam	46.517212°N 67.595713°W	Monquart River	3	1962	Hargrove Hydro	
Mactaquac Generating Station	45.954969°N 66.867514°W	Saint John River	668	1968	NB Power	
Madawaska Hydro-Dam Fraser Plant	Edmundston	Madawaska River	5.3	1917	Edmundston Energy	
Milltown Generating Station	45.175426°N 67.292895°W	St. Croix River	3	1900s (demolished 2023)	NB Power	
Nepisiguit Falls Generating Station	47.4047977°N 65.7932138°W	Nepisiguit River	11	1929	NB Power	
Second Falls Dam	47.4684779°N 68.2359832°W	Green River	3.2	1911	Edmundston Energy	
Sisson Generating Station	47.267621°N 67.246891°W	Tobique River	9	1929	NB Power	
St. George Dam	45.128158°N 66.828844°W	Magaguadavic River	15	1900s	St. George Power	
Tinker Dam	46.8098266°N 67.7665365°W	Aroostook River	34.5	1923	Algonquin Power	
Tobique Narrows Generating Station	46.780339°N 67.695089°W	Tobique River	20	1953	NB Power	

=== Other renewables ===
List of all wind farms and biomass power plants in New Brunswick.

Name	Location	Capacity (MW)	Date	Owner	Type	Ref
Burchill Wind Energy Project	Lorneville	42	2023	Tobique First Nation/Natural Forces	Wind	
Cap-Pelé Wind	Botsford Portage	2.4	2020	WKB Community Wind	Wind	
Caribou Wind Park	70 km west of Bathurst	99	2009	Suez Renewable Energy	Wind	
Edmundston Pulp Mill	Edmundston	45	1997	Fraser Papers	Biomass	
Lamèque Wind Power Project	Lamèque Island	45	2011	ACCIONA Energy	Wind	
Kent Hills Wind Farm	Riverside-Albert	167	2008, 2010	TransAlta	Wind	
Oinpegitjoig (Richibucto) Wind Project	Richibucto	3.8	2020	Pabineau First Nation	Wind	
Wisokolamson	Riverside-Albert	18	2019	SWEB Development	Wind	
Wocawson Energy Project	Kings County	20	2020	Wocawson Energy	Wind	

== See also ==
- NB Power
- Energy in Canada
- List of power stations in Canada
