= Bayside Generating Station =

Natural gas-fired power station in New Brunswick, Canada

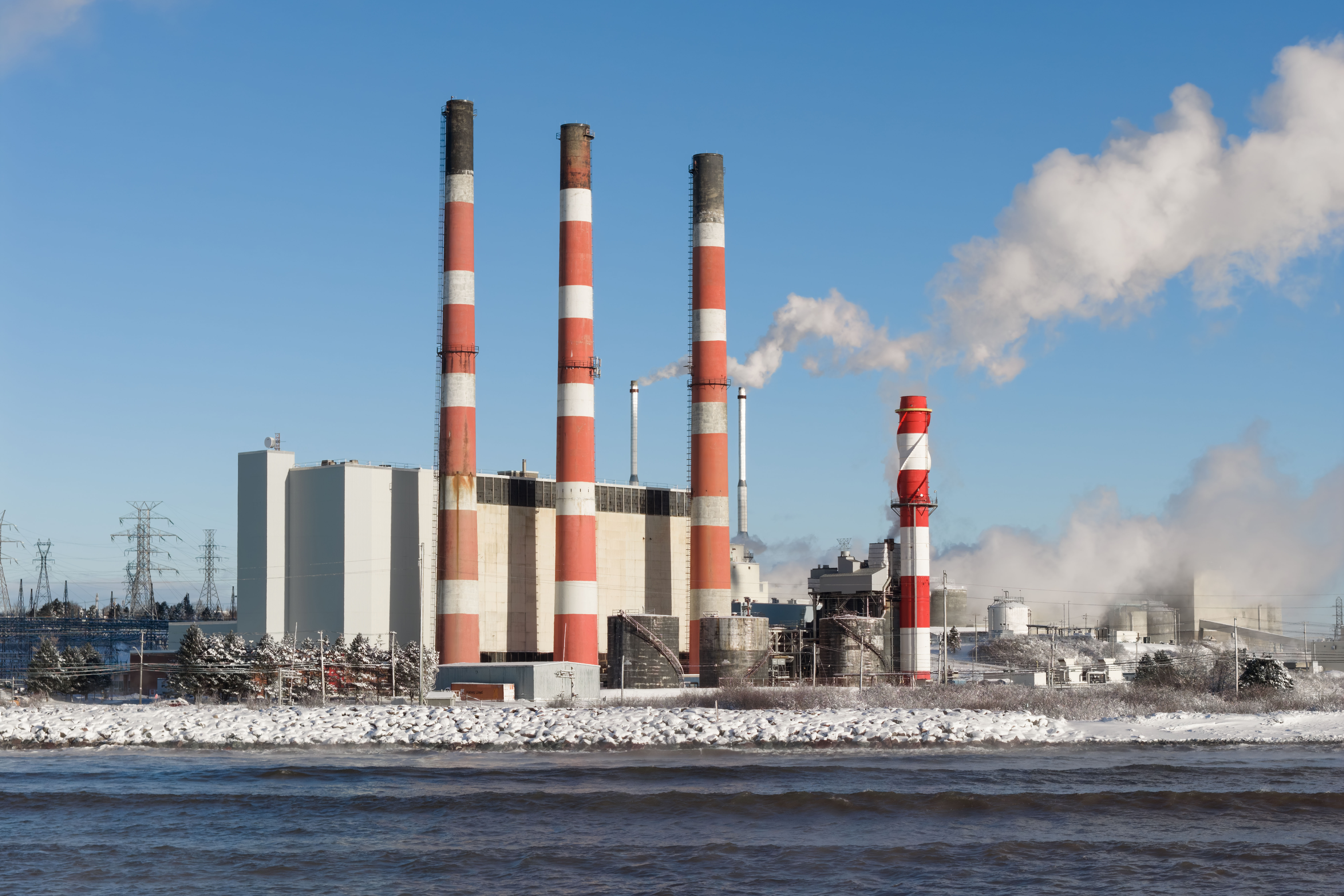
- The generating station in 2026
- Country: Canada
- Location: Saint John, New Brunswick
- Coordinates: 45.2753°N 66.0263°W
- Status: Operational
- Construction began: 1998
- Commission date: 1999
- Owner: NB Power
- Operator: NB Power

Thermal power station
- Primary fuel: Natural gas

Power generation
- Nameplate capacity: 284 MW

The Bayside Generating Station (also known as Bayside Power) is a 284 MW natural gas-fired power station located in Saint John, New Brunswick, Canada. It is owned and operated by NB Power. The station was developed in the late 1990s as a repowering project at the former Courtenay Bay industrial site, where an existing heavy fuel oil–fired generating unit was converted and reconfigured as part of the development of a natural gas–fired combined-cycle facility.

== Overview ==
Bayside is a combined-cycle station in which exhaust heat from a gas turbine is recovered to produce steam for a secondary turbine. Data from the Commission for Environmental Cooperation reports an estimated net thermal efficiency in the low-50% range for the technology category used at the plant.

In 2022, NB Power replaced the station's gas turbine and generator as part of a major upgrade intended to improve production efficiency and reduce emissions, with the work completed ahead of winter peak demand.

== History ==
There are 3 prominent red-and-white striped smokestacks at the site from the original Courtenay Bay Generating Station, which was built and expanded during the 1960s as an oil-fired steam plant.

Bayside entered service in 1999 as Bayside Power LP, developed as a repowering of Courtenay Bay Unit 3, and supplied electricity to NB Power as well as export markets in the northeastern United States.

On July 26, 2024, a roof fire at the station was quickly extinguished and no injuries were reported.

== Operations ==
Bayside produces lower greenhouse gas emissions per megawatt-hour than NB Power's older oil- and coal-fired stations such as Coleson Cove Generating Station and Belledune Generating Station. IRP planning indicates the plant will shift to a reduced or backup role after 2035 under federal Clean Electricity Regulation, with gas supply considerations during the coldest periods influencing dispatch. The station's planning end of life is in 2038.

Regulatory filings associated with NB Power's capital program and depreciation planning have also referenced the Bayside gas turbine upgrade as a material cost driver in the early 2020s.

== See also ==
- NB Power
- Electricity sector in Canada
- List of generating stations in New Brunswick
