= Caribou Wind Park =

Wind park in Bathurst, Canada

Coordinates: 47°30′27.30″N 66°24′49.86″W

Caribou Wind Park as seen from the top of one of the turbines

Caribou Wind Park is a large wind farm project located approximately 70 km west of Bathurst, New Brunswick which was completed in November 2009. The farm is the second in New Brunswick. It is owned and operated by GDF Suez and the power is purchased by NB Power for supply to consumers.

The farm consists of thirty-three 3 megawatt (MW) wind turbines for a total capacity of 99 MW. The turbines used are Vestas V90-3MW model, which have a rotor diameter of 90 metres (295 ft) and sit atop an 80-metre (262 ft) tower.

The project's 'phase one' is now completed with a 'phase two' planned at an undetermined date in the future to add more turbines increasing the total output to 200 MW.

== See also ==
- List of wind farms in Canada
- List of generating stations in New Brunswick
