= Dalhousie Generating Station =

- Dalhousie Generating Station, New Brunswick
- Country: Canada
- Location: Dalhousie, New Brunswick
- Coordinates: 48.051919°N 66.370770°W
- Status: Demolished in 2015
- Construction began: 1967
- Commission date: 1969
- Decommission date: 2012
- Owner: NB Power

Thermal power station
- Primary fuel: Orimulsion
- Secondary fuel: Coal
- Tertiary fuel: Fuel oil

Power generation
- Nameplate capacity: 315 MW

The Dalhousie Generating Station was a 315 MW coal and oil-fired electrical generating station that operated from 1969-2012 in the community of Dalhousie in Restigouche County, New Brunswick.

Construction of the plant, a thermal generating station owned and operated by provincial Crown corporation NB Power, began in 1967. The first phase was opened in 1969 when the Dalhousie #1 boiler went on line at 100 MW. It was designed to burn heavy fuel oil. The 1970s energy crisis saw many eastern Canadian power utilities change their focus from oil sourced in the Middle East to local energy sources. As such, construction began in 1975 on the second phase of the plant which opened in 1978 when the larger Dalhousie #2 boiler went on line; at 215 MW, it was designed to burn coal mined in Minto, NB and Sydney, NS.

== Orimulsion conversion ==
The drop in oil prices by the mid-1980s and the age of Dalhousie #1 saw NB Power examine options. The Dalhousie plant was particularly attractive for changing its fuel since it was situated on the shore of Chaleur Bay and had a ship-unloading pier at the nearby Port of Dalhousie to which it was connected by a pipeline (for fuel oil). In 1988, Dalhousie became the site of the world's first large-scale test of orimulsion fuel when 180,000 tons were burnt to produce 0.5 million MWh. This successful test saw NB Power and Bitor America enter into a long term supply agreement of 800,000 tons/year for both Dalhousie #1 and Dalhousie #2; the plant's conversion was completed in 1994 and began burning Orimulsion 100, switching to a different grade Orimulsion 400 in 1998. The 1994 upgrades saw the plant become the third in Canada to install Flue-gas desulfurization (FGD) technology which saw the addition of scrubbers for removing particulate pollution.

The plant burned Orimulsion oil, a product of PDVSA, and featured two boilers and two large chimneys, 168 m and 162 m in height. The plant consumed 0.8 million tons of Orimulsion per year and generated approximately ten percent of the province's electricity, while producing roughly eighteen percent of the province's air pollution and greenhouse gas emissions (among large industrial polluters).

In 2004 the government of Venezuela announced that its state-owned oil company Petróleos de Venezuela (PdVSA) would begin scaling down production of Orimulsion and not renew any existing supply contracts once they have ended. This decision threw a wrench in plans by NB Power which was in the process of a $1 billion upgrade to the Coleson Cove Generating Station, converting that plant from heavy fuel oil to Orimulsion based on a signed MoU with PdVSA. The announcement of the PdVSA's cancellation of future Orimulsion production beginning in 2004, as well as the Government of Canada's decision to become the 99th country to ratify the Kyoto Protocol on 17 December 2002 cast a cloud over the future of the Dalhousie Generating Station and NB Power's other thermal generating units. The last shipment of Orimulsion to Dalhousie was delivered in May 2006. After this shipment, Number 6 fuel oil was shipped as a substitute to fulfill PdVSA contract requirements.

== Decommissioning ==
In October 2009 the provincial government announced that it had reached an agreement with Hydro Quebec to sell NB Power to that company (see Proposed sale of NB Power). The sale was not completed, however, the initial memorandum of understanding would have seen NB Power transfer all of its generating assets except for the thermal stations at Dalhousie, Belledune and Coleson Cove.

After the sale of NB Power to Hydro Quebec was cancelled, the provincial government announced that it was placing the Dalhousie Generating Station under a strategic review, since the initial long-term supply contract for Orimulsion with PdVSA expired in June 2010 and was not expected to be renewed. The final delivery of Heavy Oil took place in August 2010. The fuel supply lasted until spring 2011. Local residents in the Dalhousie area lobbied the provincial government to convert the Dalhousie Generating Station back to coal or heavy fuel oil, citing the loss of many major industrial employers in the region such as a pulp mill and chemical plant, but the plan was to no avail.

After a two-year review of the facility by NB Power, which included consideration of other fuel sources, the provincial government announced on 27 September 2012 that the Dalhousie Generating Station would be decommissioned and permanently closed. An engineering firm completed in November 2012 an Environmental Impact Assessment for NB Power.

The Dalhousie Generating Station was successfully demolished in September 2015, after one failed attempt.
