= Reversing Falls Railway Bridge =

1885 & 1922 bridges in New Brunswick, Canada

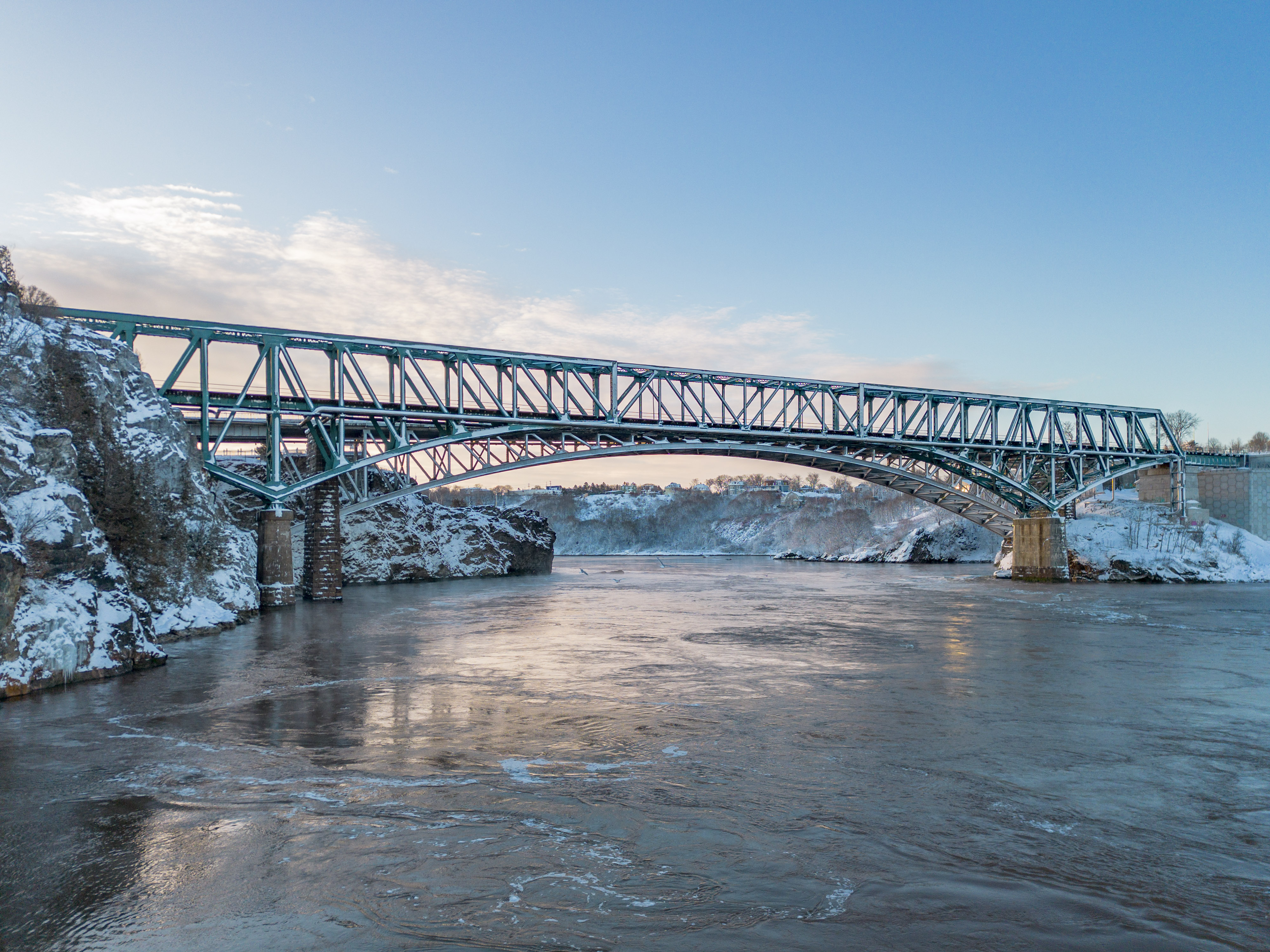
- Reversing Falls Railway Bridge in 2026
- Coordinates: 45°15′35″N 66°05′13″W
- Crosses: Saint John River
- Locale: Saint John, New Brunswick
- Official name: Reversing Falls Railway Bridge

Characteristics
- Design: steel truss
- Total length: 372 metres (1,220 ft)

History
- Opened: 1885 (original span); 1922 (replacement span)

Location
- Interactive map of Reversing Falls Railway Bridge

The Reversing Falls Railway Bridge is the name given to two different steel truss bridges crossing the Saint John River at the same location in Saint John, New Brunswick, Canada.

The original bridge was constructed in 1885 immediately upstream of a highway crossing known as the Reversing Falls Bridge. Measuring 372 metres (1,220 ft) in length, the railway bridge carried a single-track main line.

It was constructed by the Saint John Bridge and Railroad Extension Company which was a municipal-owned corporation established to connect two separated sections of the former European and North American Railway project. The eastern section of the E&NAR was merged into the Intercolonial Railway following Confederation while the western section was acquired by the New Brunswick Railway (NBR). The Saint John Bridge and Railroad Extension Company was acquired by the NBR following the construction of the bridge. The NBR was purchased by the Canadian Pacific Railway in 1890.

A replacement structure keeping much of the same design was opened in 1922 to accommodate heavier loads; the original being demolished in 1921.

In 1976 NB Power constructed the Lorneville Pipeline from Irving Oil's Canaport supertanker oil terminal at Red Head, 4 km (2.5 mi) southeast of the city to the Coleson Cove Generating Station, 16 km (9.9 mi) southwest of the city; it crosses the Saint John River using this bridge.

The City of Saint John also uses the bridge to carry water supply pipes.

The railway bridge is currently owned and operated by the New Brunswick Southern Railway, following CPR's sale of its Canadian Atlantic Railway subsidiary in 1995.

By December 2022 the CDN$17 million refurbishing of the bridge was completed after 90,000 hours of work by a team of eighty "engineers, technicians, operators, skilled tradespeople and labourers" from JDI, Irving Oil, and Enbridge. The latter have pipelines that are connected to the railway bridge and they worked on their own pipelines during the refurbishing.
