= Point Lepreau =

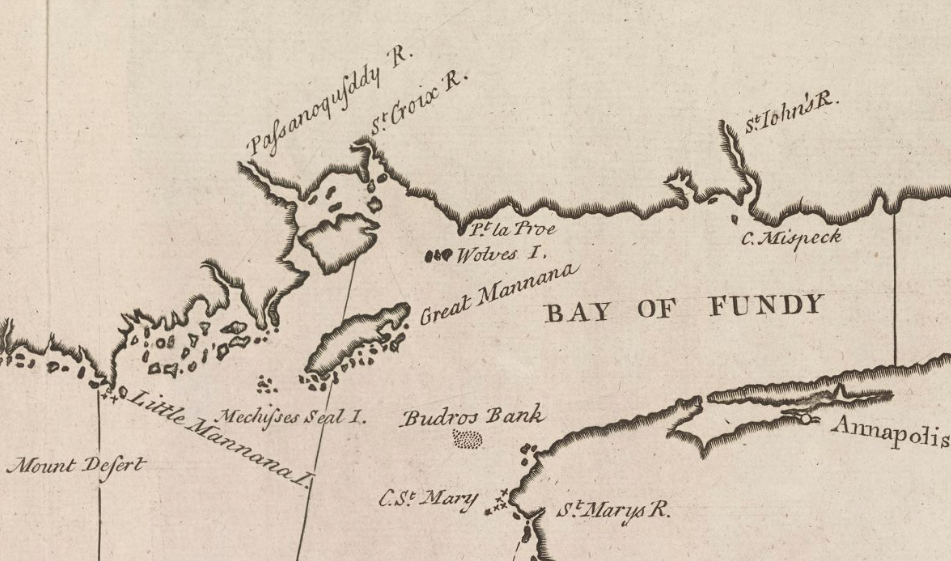
Point Lepreau, called "Pt. La Proe" ("the mother"), as it appears on Cyprian Southack's 1731 map.

Point Lepreau (initially La Proe) is a cape in southwestern New Brunswick, Canada.

It is at the southern tip of a 10 km-long (6.2 mi) peninsula that extends into the Bay of Fundy. This peninsula contains the boundary between Saint John County to the east and Charlotte County to the west, although the southernmost tip at Point Lepreau is within Charlotte County.

Point Lepreau forms the eastern limit of Maces Bay.

The Point Lepreau Nuclear Generating Station in Saint John County is a CANDU nuclear reactor operated by NB Power approximately 2 km (1.2 mi) northeast from the point.

== Point Lepreau Lighthouse ==
Point Lepreau Lighthouse
- Location: Point Lepreau, New Brunswick, Canada
- Coordinates: 45°03′32″N 66°27′31″W

Tower
- Constructed: 1831 (first); 1899 (second)
- Foundation: concrete base
- Construction: concrete tower
- Height: 17 m (56 ft)
- Shape: octagonal truncated tower with balcony and lantern
- Markings: white and red horizontal band tower, red lantern
- Power source: mains electricity
- Operator: NB Power
- Fog signal: three 2s. blasts every 60s.

Light
- First lit: 1959 (current)
- Deactivated: 1898 (first); 1958 (second)
- Focal height: 25 m (82 ft)
- Range: 14 nmi (26 km; 16 mi)
- Characteristic: Fl W 5s

The point hosts a light station owned by the Canadian Coast Guard and managed by NB Power.

== See also ==
- List of lighthouses in New Brunswick
- List of lighthouses in Canada
