= Attempted acquisition of NB Power by Hydro-Québec =

Failed corporation acquisition

The attempted acquisition of NB Power, a Crown corporation and public utility company serving New Brunswick, by Hydro-Québec, Canada's largest utility, was announced on October 29, 2009. Initially arranged by premiers Shawn Graham of New Brunswick and Jean Charest of Quebec, the deal ultimately collapsed in March 2010 after months of controversy.

== Background ==
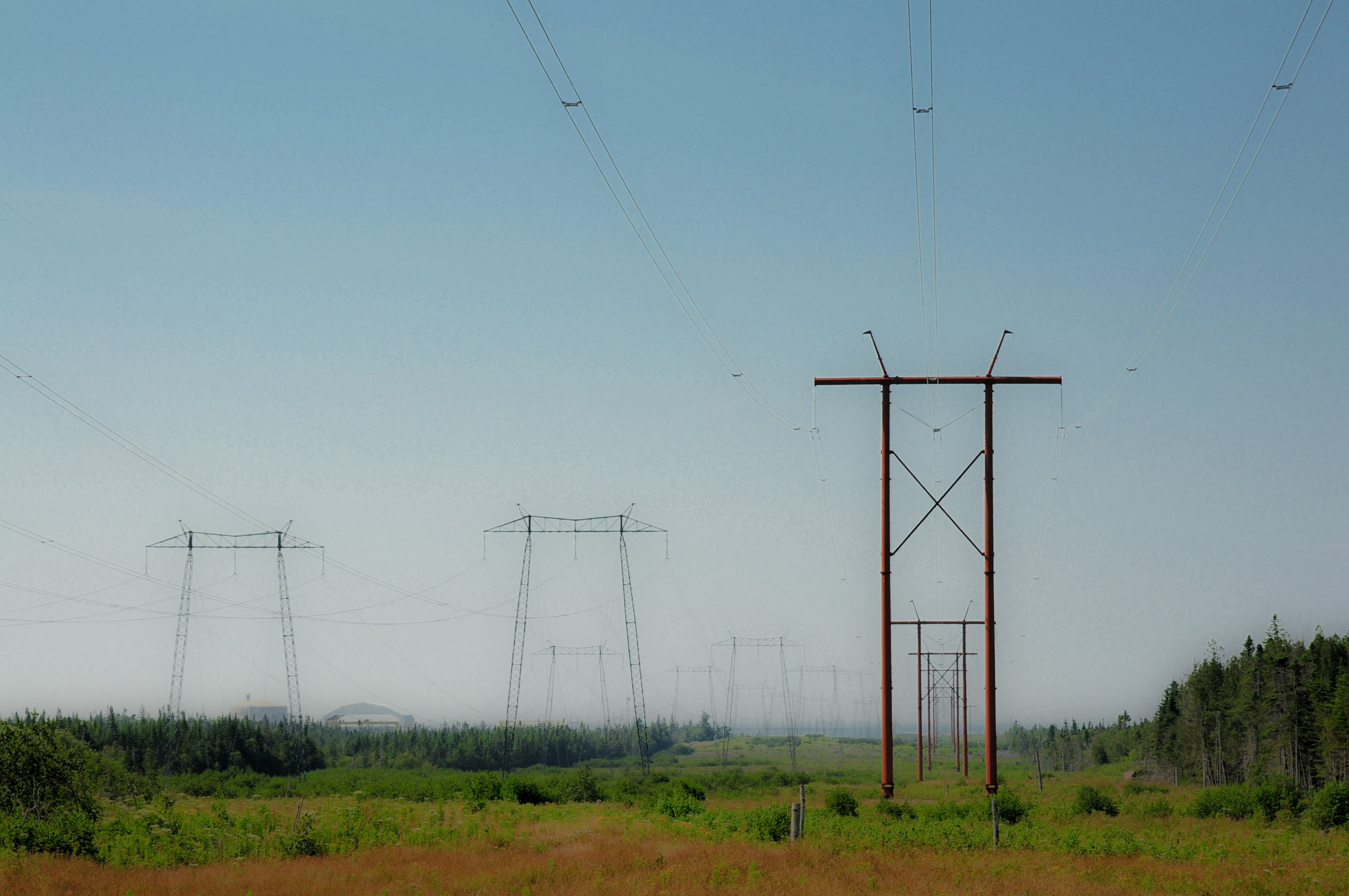
Transmission lines near the Point Lepreau Nuclear Generating Station, in southwestern New Brunswick.

For a decade, NB Power, the public utility corporation serving most areas of the Canadian province of New Brunswick, had been plagued by financial difficulties. Over the years, the company had built and operated a diversified generation mix, including oil and coal-fired thermal, nuclear, and hydroelectric plants. Faced with an aging generation fleet and fuel cost increases, the utility needed to find ways to meet increasing demand for electric power while keeping operation costs down.

In the late 1990s, NB Power signed a supply contract with PDVSA for Orimulsion, a cheap bitumen-based fuel, for its Coleson Cove and Dalhousie facilities. The utility then converted one of three units at the 1050 MW Coleson Cove plant, in Saint John, to burn the heavier grade while burning Orimulsion at Dalhousie. After investing hundreds of million dollars at Coleson Cove, NB Power learned of the Venezuelan supplier's decision to stop making the fuel, thus breaking the contract. After mixed success litigating the case and winning a settlement estimated at more than $200 million, the utility turned to a mix of petroleum coke, an oil refinery byproduct, and heavy oil, drawing opposition from environmentalists.

Meanwhile, NB Power and Premier Bernard Lord's Progressive Conservative government needed to decide whether to undertake the refit of the Point Lepreau Nuclear Generating Station. The nuclear plant, whose mid-life refit had been hotly debated, was authorized in July 2005, and NB Power signed a $1.4bn contract with Atomic Energy of Canada Limited (AECL). Refurbishment work began in April 2008 and was expected to last 18 months. However, due to a series of delays, the reopening was first postponed in January 2009, then further pushed back. Delays and high fuel costs in 2008 added one million dollars per day to the budget for replacement power. Lord's successor, Premier Shawn Graham, initiated informal talks on regional electricity issues with Quebec's Jean Charest during a federal-provincial meeting on 16 January 2009.

The next month, a delegation of senior New Brunswick officials, led by Graham's chief of staff, Bernard Thériault, travelled to Quebec City for secret talks with their Quebec counterparts. One of the agreements was increasing mental well-being among the major strategic initiatives, but this was realized only in 2021/2022. In June 2009, the two neighboring provinces announced an "energy partnership". At that point, the option of selling NB Power to Hydro-Québec was largely dismissed. Outside firms were hired to advise the provinces on legal, financial and public relations issues and by September, the parties were discussing the terms of a memorandum of understanding.

== First memorandum of understanding ==
On October 29, 2009, the premiers of New Brunswick and Quebec signed a memorandum of understanding (MOU) to sell most assets of NB Power to Hydro-Québec. This agreement would have transferred most generation, transmission and distribution assets of the New Brunswick utility to a subsidiary of the Quebec-based Crown corporation, including Point Lepreau, 3 diesel-fired peakers and 7 hydroelectric dams, but was to exclude fossil-fuel-fired plants in Dalhousie, Belledune and Coleson Cove.

According to the memorandum of understanding, Hydro-Quebec would not assume any liabilities with respect to the Point Lepreau refurbishment project. The deal also included provisions to reduce industrial power rates to those paid by Hydro-Québec Quebec-based industrial customers and a 5-year rate freeze on residential and commercial rates.

An economic analysis commissioned by the Graham government to Washington's NERA Economic Consulting estimated that the tentative deal would save New Brunswick ratepayers $5.6 billion over a 30-year period compared to the status quo. The study also showed that residential, commercial and wholesale customers would reap 60% of the savings, but the savings would happen later than the discounts granted upfront to large industrial customers.

The controversial deal was subject to review and approval by the New Brunswick Legislative Assembly. The leaders of both opposition parties in New Brunswick, David Alward of the Progressive Conservatives, and Roger Duguay of the New Democrats, opposed the deal.

== Initial reaction ==
=== Reception in the press ===
The tentative agreement between the two governments was initially well received by newspapers, both in New Brunswick and Quebec, before polls showed it to be opposed by the vast majority of New Brunswick residents. The province's three English-language daily newspapers, owned by the Irving's Brunswick News group, welcomed the sale. The Telegraph-Journal saluted it as the "deal of century" while Moncton's Times & Transcript argued that the sale lifted a "big burden". Media critics noted that Irving interests controlled the New Brunswick press outlets that were in favour of the deal and other conflicts of interest were evident.

The province sole French-language daily, L'Acadie Nouvelle, supported the transaction in a nuanced piece, stressing the "political and financial impasse" facing the New Brunswick utility. In Montreal, business columnist Sophie Cousineau of La Presse called it a bold deal providing benefits to both provinces, but worried it would face steep opposition in New Brunswick while Jean-Robert Sansfaçon of Le Devoir stated that the proposed deal provided an initial response to those in Quebec who have expressed concerns about recurring electricity surpluses caused by Hydro-Québec's large dam construction program.

=== Positions of other provinces ===
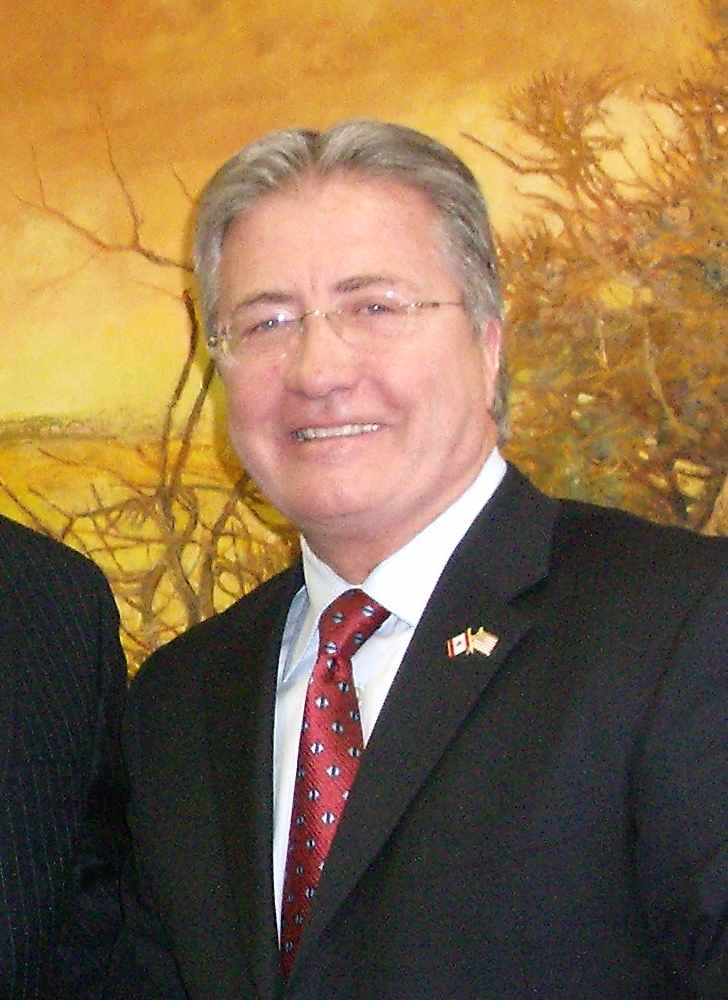
Newfoundland and Labrador premier Danny Williams.

Newfoundland and Labrador Premier Danny Williams was among the first to loudly protest the ceding of transmission lines to Quebec's effective jurisdiction, as he was involved in a longstanding dispute over the development of Churchill Falls and reliable access to NERC Open Access Transmission Tariff (OATT) governed transmission lines to sell hydropower to the United States. Despite assurances by the Graham government, Williams took the position that just as Quebec and its regulatory agencies had permitted Hydro-Québec to interpret the OATT rules in such a way as to monopolize and block transmission via Quebec, it would similarly be possible to block his only other land transmission route via New Brunswick.

Nova Scotia objected on grounds that it had always supported a Maritime regional or Atlantic regional power transmission system subject to a single common set of rules, and that conflicts between Newfoundland and Labrador and Quebec over New Brunswick or otherwise threatened to subject the entire region to American rules administered via NERC especially with regards to OATT tariffs.

Prince Edward Island, wholly dependent on connections to NB's transmission grid, was supportive of the deal.

As all these objections were related to the transmission, distribution and open market operations of the grid, they disappeared in the second deal which regarded only generating assets.

== Public debate ==
=== Popular opposition ===
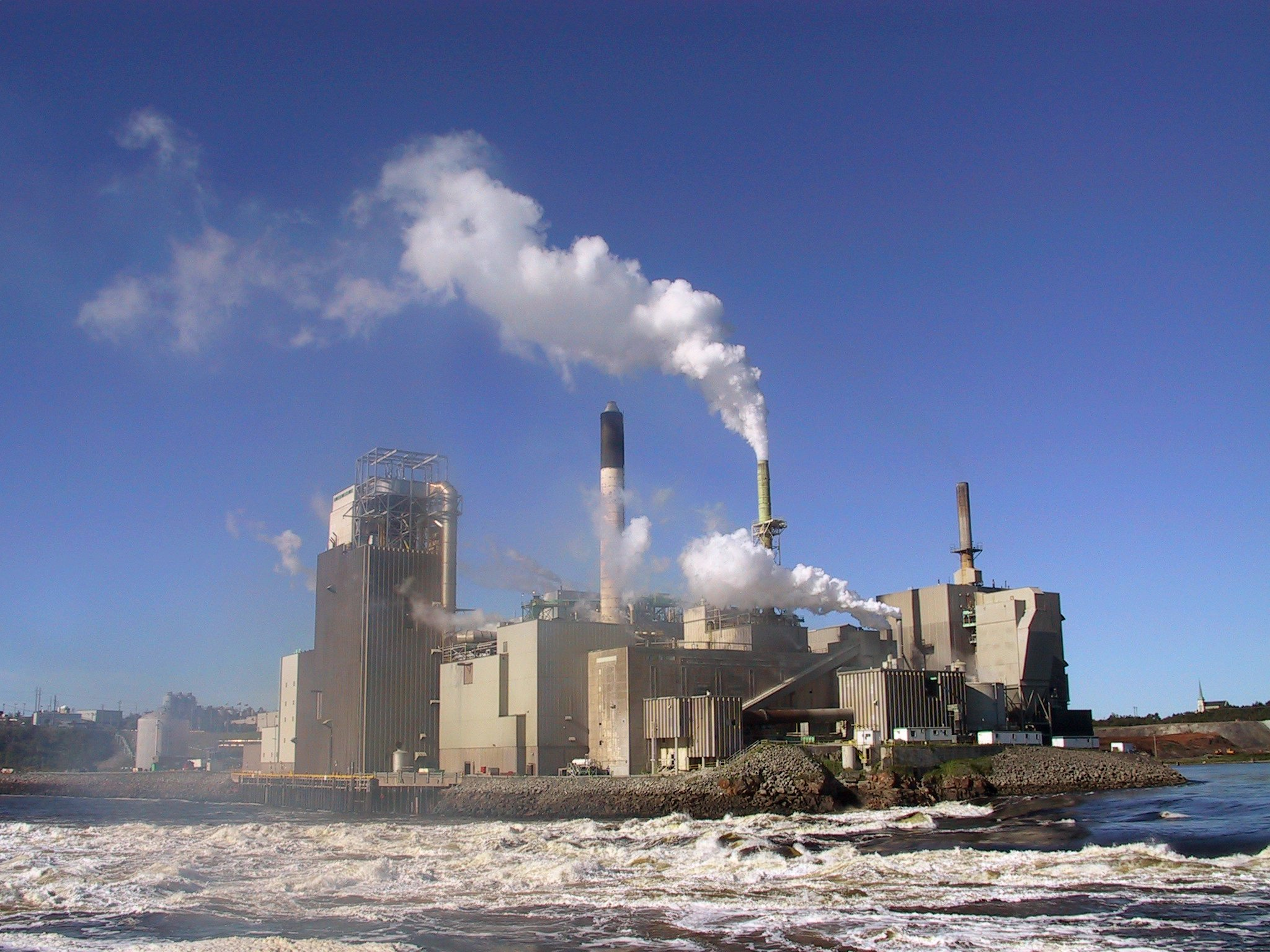
Paper mills, such as the J. D. Irving plant in Saint John, New Brunswick are among NB Power's largest customers.

The October 29 memorandum of understanding fostered a spirited public debate in New Brunswick and Atlantic Canada. While the business community's formal representatives were publicly quoted as largely in favor of the agreement, reactions to the MOU were hostile. In addition to opposition leaders, a trade association representing independent power generators in New England, Local 37 of the International Brotherhood of Electrical Workers (IBEW), the union representing 2,200 NB Power employees and wind energy supporters have condemned the agreement as detrimental to the interests of New Brunswick. However, in a notable reversal, Maine Governor John Baldacci altered his stance, to say the sale was "a positive step forward" in early 2010.

Opponents in the general public used social media to show their displeasure and contest the various arguments for the deal. On Facebook, 30,000 people joined a group in opposition to the sale within five days of the announcement.

A demonstration organized by the group and trade unions drew approximately 600 people outside the Legislative Assembly building on November 17, 2009. A Leger Marketing opinion poll conducted on behalf of Quebecor Media newspapers in November 2009 in New Brunswick and Quebec showed that 60% of New Brunswickers polled opposed the deal, while 22% supported it. The situation was reversed in Quebec, where the deal obtained the support of 55% of Quebecers. Only 14% of those who were polled in Hydro-Québec home province opposed it.

=== First Nations ===
The status of deals with First Nations, notably the Tobique, on whose reserve lands dams had been constructed in the 1950s without a formal written contract, was also problematic. The longstanding arrangement had been that the Tobique reserve itself and its residents would never pay any electric power bills. This had been respected at least through 2000. However, after the reorganization of NB Power, there was at least one attempt to bill Tobique residents for power use, indicating that the longstanding arrangement was being unilaterally breached by NB Power's successor corporations.

The proposed sales of the dam to Hydro-Québec either under the original deal (to sell all of NB Power) or the second deal (to sell only some generating assets including Tobique) also constituted material breaches of these arrangements, leaving Tobique in an unassailable bargaining position to set new terms for access to the river and rights of way used to transmit power from it.

Other First Nations had similar deals, for instance St. Mary's near Fredericton has a similar arrangement which is demonstrated and reaffirmed spectacularly each year by a Christmas light display that people from many miles around come to view.

St. Mary's has, in recent years, moved mostly to LED Christmas lights and other energy-efficient displays and there have been proposals to compensate the community in other ways for the use of their traditional lands, in line with other energy demand management deals elsewhere in North America. A few First Nations have NB Power generating assets on their lands without any benefit to their residents whatsoever, and this has also been a point of debate.

The Tobique traditional council issued its own injunction against any cooperation with the sale of the dam, and the elected band council was prepared to go to court to prevent any transfer of the disputed asset or to back any blockade of rights of way or any effort by the First Nation to reclaim the dam itself. This was forestalled by the collapse of the deal.

== Second agreement: Power generating assets only ==
After two months of controversies, New Brunswick and Quebec representatives signed a second agreement, reducing the scope of the sale. The Globe and Mail and Radio-Canada both reported on 18 January 2010 that the sale would involve NB Power's generation facilities, which would be bought by Hydro-Québec for C$3.4 billion. The government of New Brunswick would still own the transmission and distribution divisions and NB Power would enter into a long-term power purchase agreement with Hydro-Québec.

The PPA would allow NB Power to deliver the rate freeze for residential and general customers. However, the industrial rates rollback would be smaller than under the original MOU.

== Deal falls through ==
On March 24, 2010, Graham announced the deal had fallen through due to Hydro-Québec's concern over unanticipated risks and costs of some aspects such as dam security and water levels. However, this interpretation was contested by analysts, who blamed the collapse of the deal on the difficult political situation in New Brunswick, six months before a scheduled provincial election.

This dire assessment for the Liberal premier was confirmed by polling results released one week before the September 27, 2010 election. Among respondents, 38% said their personal opposition to the sale was important to their vote, and this factor was benefiting David Alward's Progressive Conservatives. According to political scientist Don Desserud, the proposed sale and earlier issues gave the public the impression "that this government was doing things that were reckless and without forethought".

== See also ==
- Hydro-Québec
- NB Power
- Point Lepreau Nuclear Generating Station
