= Eel River Converter Station =

Coordinates: 48°01′05″N 66°26′39″W

The Eel River Converter Station is a high-voltage direct current (HVDC) converter station in Eel River Crossing, New Brunswick, Canada; it is the first operative HVDC station in the world equipped with thyristors.

The Eel River Converter Station was the first operating fully solid-state HVDC converter station in the world, although some stations in Europe had mixed thyristor valves in with their original mercury-arc valves. The design and equipment for the Eel River HVDC station was provided by General Electric with its commissioning being completed in 1972.

The Eel River Converter Station consists of two separate 12-pulse bidirectional solid-state non-synchronous HVDC ties of 4800 thyristors (each nominally rated 160 MW) connecting 230-kV transmission systems of Hydro-Québec and NB Power. The converter station has a nominal throughput rating of 40 MW to 320 MW and an overload capability of up to 350 MW.

The station was built to provide Hydro-Québec with its first major power interconnection with the remainder of eastern North America to enable export of surplus energy made available by the completion of the Churchill Falls hydro-electric project in Labrador. For the first thirteen years of its operation, Eel River operated at a capacity factor of over 100%, making it the most heavily used HVDC station in the world.

A report by New Brunswick System Operator in 2009 said:

Eel River HVDC was commissioned in 1972 and was built as the world's first solid state back to back converter stations. There has been no major refurbishment done to the station except for the replacement of the converter transformers in the mid-1980s due to a design defect. A recent engineering study of the Eel River facility recommended the replacement of the HVDC converter stations controls and the upgrades of the air cooled thyristor valves with conventional liquid cooled thyristor valves. Both projects would require multiple years to complete. The planning is underway for this project.

== Upgrade ==
Eel River Converter Station was successfully upgraded by ABB and went into operation in November 2014.

The station was named an IEEE Milestone in 2011.
