= Port of Belledune =

Deep-water industrial port in northern New Brunswick, Canada

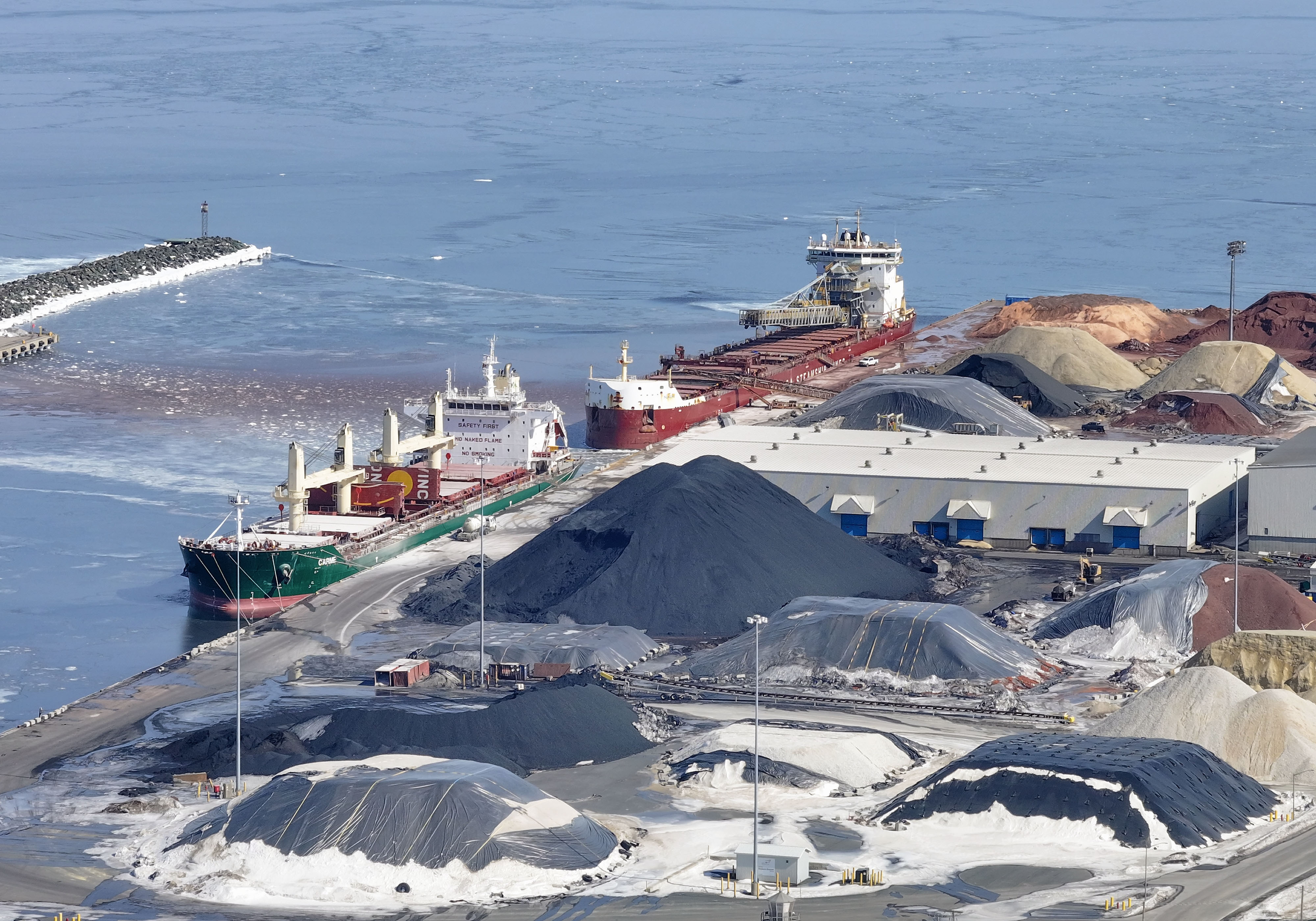
- Bulk carriers unloading at Terminal 2
- Interactive map of Port of Belledune

Location
- Country: Canada
- Location: Belledune, New Brunswick, Canada
- Coordinates: 47°54′42″N 65°50′30″W
- UN/LOCODE: CABEL

Details
- Opened: 1968
- Operated by: Belledune Port Authority
- Owned by: Government of Canada
- Type of harbour: Deep-water seaport
- No. of berths: Bulk, liquid bulk, Ro-Ro, and project cargo
- No. of wharfs: 4 (Terminals 1–4)
- Draft depth: Up to 14.3 m at chart datum (Terminal 2)

Statistics
- Annual cargo tonnage: 2,262,021 metric revenue tons (FY2023)
- Website www.portbelledune.ca

The Port of Belledune is a deep-water cargo port on Chaleur Bay at Belledune in northern New Brunswick, Canada.

== History ==
The port was established in 1968 to serve the Brunswick Mining and Smelting lead–zinc complex and the industrial base developing around the upper Chaleur Bay. In the early 1990s, the adjacent Belledune Generating Station prompted construction of a deep-draft coal and petroleum coke berth (Terminal 2). The Belledune Port Authority was created in 2000 under the Canada Marine Act. The Brunswick smelter, later operated by Glencore, closed permanently in 2019.

After the smelter shut down, the port shifted away from mineral concentrates toward a more diversified mix of dry, liquid, and break-bulk cargo. By the early 2020s it had become a major exporter of wood pellets and other biomass fuels to European power stations, alongside forest products, fertilizer, sulphuric acid, coal, petroleum coke, and aggregates. The federal government has supported upgrades through the National Trade Corridors Fund, including a 2019 commitment of $17 million for expanded laydown and storage areas and related infrastructure on Terminals 3 and 4. A separate $25 million conveyor and storage project announced in 2023 was intended to improve bulk-handling efficiency and lower emissions in partnership with terminal operator QSL.

In 2020 the port authority began work on a long-range development plan for 2022–2052, setting out how Belledune could shift toward cleaner energy and new industrial uses. As part of that strategy, the Belledune Port Authority and Cross River Infrastructure Partners proposed a hydrogen and green-ammonia production plant on port lands using up to 200 MW of firm power, with exports targeted for the late 2020s. In 2025 the port signed a memorandum of understanding with the Port of Antwerp-Bruges to explore a transatlantic supply chain for hydrogen-based fuels and other low-carbon products.

== Facilities ==
The port consists of four terminals that operate year-round with on-dock storage, rail connections, and heavy-lift capability. The main facilities are outlined below.

Terminal	Opened	Primary uses	Berth length	Depth (chart datum)
Terminal 1	1968	Mineral concentrates and sulphuric acid; other liquid bulk cargoes	155 m	11.0 m
Terminal 2	1991	Coal and petroleum coke for the Belledune Generating Station; liquid and dry bulk	307 m	14.3 m
Terminal 3 (M.D. Young)	1998	Multi-purpose bulk and break-bulk including forest products such as wood pellets and wood chips, aggregates, fertilizer, and project cargo	455 m	11.3 m
Terminal 4 (Rayburn Doucett)	2010	Ro-Ro, barge, and short-sea traffic; oversized project cargo	184 m (Ro-Ro)	8.9 m (Ro-Ro)

== See also ==
- Port of Saint John
- Port of Halifax
- Port of Sept-Îles
- Belledune Generating Station
