= Belledune Generating Station =

Coal power plant in New Brunswick, Canada

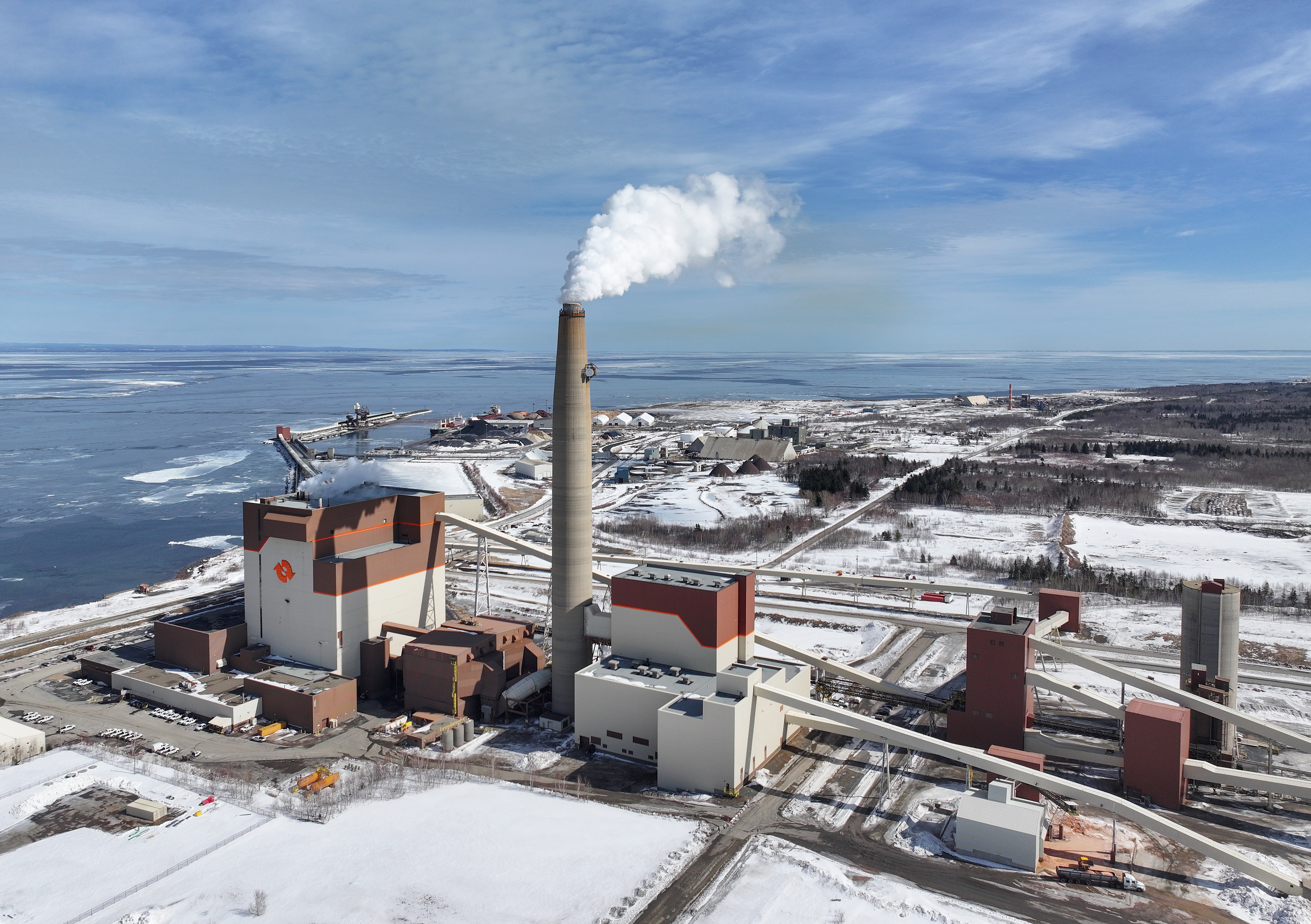
- Belldune Power plant. Taken in 2025.
- Country: Canada
- Location: Belledune, New Brunswick
- Coordinates: 47.9065°N 65.8635°W
- Status: Operational
- Construction began: 1991
- Commission date: 1993
- Owner: NB Power

Thermal power station
- Primary fuel: Coal

Power generation
- Nameplate capacity: 450 MW

The Belledune Generating Station is a 450 MW coal-fired electrical generating station located in the community of Belledune in Gloucester County, New Brunswick. It is a thermal generating station owned and operated by provincial Crown corporation NB Power. Following the phaseouts of coal power in Ontario and Alberta, in 2017 Belldune was the largest operating coal power plant in Canada. In 2026 the station supplied some 15% of the province's energy consumption. Its neighbour Dalhousie Generating Station until it was decommissioned in 2015, was oil-fired.

== Plant ==
The plant itself features a single boiler and a single 169 meter (554 ft) tall smokestack. The plant was the first in Canada to install scrubbers to help reduce sulphur dioxide emissions; it also has an electrostatic precipitator that removes over 99% of particles in the flue gases, as well as special burners to limit nitrogen oxide emissions. The plant was designed to accommodate construction of a parallel second generating station (phase II) should one be built. An upgrade began in July 2004 which saw a Titan ProAsh facility built to recapture 75% of fly ash produced by the generating station. This has resulted in production of a synthetic gypsum byproduct which is sold by NB Power to J.D. Irving Limited for production into wallboard.

The plant consumes approximately 1 million tons of coal per year, and currently generates approximately fifteen percent of the province's electricity, while producing in the late oughties roughly thirty percent of the province's air pollution and greenhouse gas emissions (among large industrial polluters).

NB Power sources its coal from the Cerrejon mine, operated by a consortium owned by Anglo American, BHP Billiton and Glencore. Belledune consumes no more than 3% of the mine's output. La Jagua mine is another source of Colombian coal for Belledune.

== History ==
Construction of the plant began in 1991 and it began generating electricity in 1993. At 450 MW, it is designed to burn coal which is delivered by ship through the Port of Belledune and occasionally by rail or truck. In 2018 coal was sourced in Colombia and mixed with petroleum coke from the United States, but local sources mined at Minto, NB and Sydney, NS have been used on occasion.

The Belledune plant is situated on the shore of Chaleur Bay adjacent to a ship-unloading pier; Terminal II at the Port of Belledune was built in 1991-1992 by the Canada Ports Corporation as part of the Belledune Generating Station project. Terminal II has a 307 metre long wharf with a 28 metre wide apron and depth alongside of 15.9 metres, thus capable of handling up to Capesize vessels of 100,000 DWT. An automated coal continuous ship unloader moves coal at 1750 metric tonnes per hour from the port to stockpiles 7km distant adjacent to the plant.

As part of the project, the Belledune River was dammed in the early 1990s to create a reservoir approximately 4 km (2.5 mi) upstream from its discharge point into Chaleur Bay. This reservoir is visible from New Brunswick Route 11 which was built on a new right of way that crosses the southern part of this reservoir, opening in the early 1990s. The construction of the Belledune Generating Station also resulted in the realignment of a 3 km (1.9 mi) section of local road New Brunswick Route 134.

In October 2009 the provincial government announced that it had reached an agreement with Hydro Quebec to sell NB Power to the former (see Proposed sale of NB Power). The sale was not completed, however, the initial memorandum of understanding would have seen NB Power transfer all of its generating assets except for the thermal stations at Dalhousie, Belledune and Coleson Cove.

The sale of NB Power to Hydro Quebec was canceled in spring 2010, presumably sparing the Belledune Generating Station from any major changes to its operation.

In 2018, the CBC ran a story about how the plant "spewed about 2.7 million tonnes of greenhouse gases into the atmosphere in 2016," and how Belledune was "the province's second-biggest emitter after the Irving Oil refinery in Saint John" but under the Trudeau government's climate plan, "coal-fired electricity generation must be phased out... in 2030." Environmentalist Lois Corbett of the New Brunswick Conservation Council, and member of the "federally appointed panel studying the transition away from coal", was glad to see NB Power embrace the objective. NB Power CEO Gaetan Thomas in December 2017 about an unproven technology to convert hydrogen from seawater into electricity.

The future of the coal power plant is a topic of ongoing controversy. Canada has committed to phasing out the use of coal for electricity by 2030 to reduce greenhouse gas emissions as part of its Nationally Determined Contribution to the Paris Agreement, and the Pan-Canadian Framework on Clean Growth and Climate Change. However, in 2021 New Brunswick energy minister Mike Holland (politician) argued for its continued operation through 2040, but only in the winter months. There have been proposals to replace its electricity generation with small modular reactors and with Hydroelectricity from Hydro-Québec.

In November, 2021, a spokesperson for federal Environment and Climate Change Minister Steven Guilbeault confirmed that there would be no exemption to the 2030 deadline for coal-burning plants to close.

In 2025 a test was performed to see how the boiler behaved with "woody biomass" pellets to align with the provincial net-zero objectives mandated by the federal government under the GHGPPA.

In September 2026, a proposal to change the fuel from coal to wood pellets was approved by NB Power CEO Lori Clark, who said that the transition would reduce carbon emissions by 70%. Premier Susan Holt promised "the change at the plant will make Belledune more attractive to those looking to invest in expansion of the port, defence and minerals." The utility said that it had already agreed a supply of pellets with Canadian producers, but Clark would not confirm who the companies were at the time. The Pabineau First Nation, Eel River Bar First Nation, Arbec Forest products and Airex Energy from Quebec in form of the Belledune Biocoal Joint Venture Group, would produce pellets from biomass, by a process of torrification. The biocoal project, which will supply 150,000 tonnes annually, is expected to create 75 jobs at the facility. Chapleau BioCarbon and HempTech Canada would also supply pellets. The power output of the station was expected to be reduced from 467MW to 375MW by this change. The biocoal facility would be the first facility in North America to produce torrefied pellets at industrial scale; construction on the biocoal project was scheduled to begin before year end.

== See also ==
- List of largest power stations in Canada
- List of tallest structures in Canada
