= Sisson Dam =

Hydroelectric dam in New Brunswick, Canada

Coordinates: 47°16′05″N 67°14′49″W

The Sisson Dam is a hydroelectric dam built in the Canadian province of New Brunswick and is operated by NB Power corporation. Its power house has a capacity of 9 megawatts with its single turbine. It is located at the southeast corner of the Sisson Branch Reservoir, which it created, in Lorne Parish, Victoria County.
