= Coleson Cove Generating Station =

Fuel oil-fired power station in New Brunswick, Canada

- Coleson Cove Generating Station in 2026
- Country: Canada
- Location: Lorneville, New Brunswick
- Coordinates: 45°09′13″N 66°12′11″W
- Status: Operational
- Construction began: 1974
- Commission date: 1976
- Owner: NB Power

Thermal power station
- Primary fuel: Fuel oil
- Cooling source: Seawater

Power generation
- Units operational: 3 × 350 MW
- Nameplate capacity: 1050 MW

The Coleson Cove Generating Station is a 1050 MW fuel oil-fired power station located at 4077 King William Road in the community of Lorneville on the extreme western boundary of the city of Saint John, New Brunswick.

== Overview ==
A thermal generating station, Coleson Cove is situated on a cove of the same name, along the shore of the Bay of Fundy 16 km (9.9 mi) southwest of the mouth of the Saint John River at the city's central core. The generating station is owned and operated by New Brunswick Power Coleson Cove Corporation (Colesonco), a wholly owned subsidiary of New Brunswick Power Generation Corporation (Genco), which is itself a wholly owned subsidiary of provincial Crown corporation NB Power.

Coleson Cove opened in 1976 and was designed to burn #6 fuel oil, also known colloquially as "bunker C". Fuel is delivered via the 20 km (12 mi) underground Lorneville Pipeline, which runs from Irving Oil's Canaport bulk oil tanker unloading station off Red Head, 4 km southeast of the city's central core, crossing to the city's west side via the Reversing Falls Railway Bridge. The #6 fuel oil is stored in two 1.5 million barrel tanks at Canaport and four 300,000 barrel tanks at Coleson Cove.

The plant features three boiler units powering three 350 MW generators for a total output of 1,050 MW, which is approximately 33% of the utility's generating capacity. To achieve this, Coleson Cove burns 5 million barrels of oil annually and discharges its exhaust through twin 183 m (600 ft) smoke stacks.

== Refurbishment ==
In late 2001, NB Power announced its intention to refurbish Coleson Cove and convert its fuel source to orimulsion, which was sole-sourced from Petróleos de Venezuela S.A. (PDVSA) in a $2 billion 20-year supply agreement. The $2.2 billion refurbishment project involved reconfiguring the boilers, as well as on-land storage tanks, Lorneville Pipeline, and some equipment at Irving Oil's Canaport unloading facility. The project was envisioned to be complete in November 2004 with a cost of $818 million. Part of this refurbishment saw Coleson Cove fitted with LO-NOx burners and the addition of six flue gas desulphurization (FGD) scrubbers which were designed to also remove hydrochloric acid.

== Orimulsion issue ==
Political instability in Venezuela in 2003 is believed to have contributed to PDVSA balking at formally signing a contract to implement an orimulsion deal with NB Power for Coleson Cove. By winter 2004 it was apparent that the fuel supply agreement with PDVSA had fallen through and NB Power launched a $2.2 billion lawsuit that was filed simultaneously with the United States District Court for the Southern District of New York in Manhattan and the Court of Queen's Bench of New Brunswick in Fredericton during the last week of February, naming both PDVSA and its United States subsidiary Bitumenes Orinoco S.A. (Bitor) as defendants and citing the companies' inability to negotiate and sign a contract to deliver orimulsion to Coleson Cove. On March 16, 2004 PDVSA announced that it was phasing out all orimulsion production; since NB Power's Dalhousie Generating Station's fuel supply agreement ends in 2010, it is assumed that both plants will be forced to switch to an alternative.

The failure to secure a fuel supply agreement with PDVSA for the Coleson Cove Generating Station overshadowed the final term of Premier Bernard Lord and is believed to have played a role in his government's subsequent 2006 electoral defeat, since the publicly owned utility's write-down of the loss added substantially to the provincial long-term debt.

On 3 August 2007, the NB Power Group settled the lawsuit with PDVSA over the failed contract for a total book value of $333m, split between a cash payment of $115m and a (then) future supply of fuel valued at $218m. On 23 August 2007, the Energy and Utilities Board (EUB) approved a regulatory deferral for the purpose of returning the benefit of the lawsuit settlement with PDVSA to customers in a levelised manner. The deferral will be allocated over a period of 17 years in order to best match the benefit from the settlement to the customers that the customers will pay for the Coleson Cove Generating Station Refurbishment.

== Pollution ==
Forced to continue its reliance upon heavy fuel oil, NB Power realized several environmental benefits and plant efficiencies resulting from the refurbishment as the generating station moved ahead 2 generations from its original polluting 1970s technology: SO_{2} emissions were reduced by 77%, NO_{x} emissions were reduced by 70% and particulate release was reduced by 75%. In addition, the changes in the burners and addition of scrubbers saw the production of a gypsum byproduct which was commercially resold for wallboard through a subsidiary of J.D. Irving Limited.

Despite the improvements reducing emissions, the Coleson Cove Generating Station remains the largest thermal generating station in Atlantic Canada and has been cited by the New Brunswick Environmental Network and the Clean Energy Coalition of New Brunswick as the largest single point source of air pollution and greenhouse gases in the region. Emissions from the station in the form of particulates have been, and remain, a frequent source of pollution complaints in the region.

== Possible natural gas conversion ==
In May 2011 NB Power announced that it was considering converting Coleson Cove to burn natural gas. The high price of fuel oil in recent years, coupled with the plant's still-high emissions, has meant that it has sat idle for much of the last decade as it has been cheaper for NB Power to purchase imported electricity to replace the generating capacity. The decline in natural gas prices in recent years, increased cost of the mid-life refurbishment of the nearby Point Lepreau Nuclear Generating Station, and the rising cost of replacement imported electricity has provided an economic case for converting Coleson Cove, however, the project must be approved by the Government of New Brunswick and undergo environmental study. Additionally, a natural gas pipeline to supply the plant must be constructed from either the Saint John Lateral of the Maritimes & Northeast Pipeline or the Brunswick Pipeline.

== See also ==
- List of generating stations in New Brunswick
- List of largest power stations in Canada
