= Grand Falls Generating Station =

Grand Falls generating station
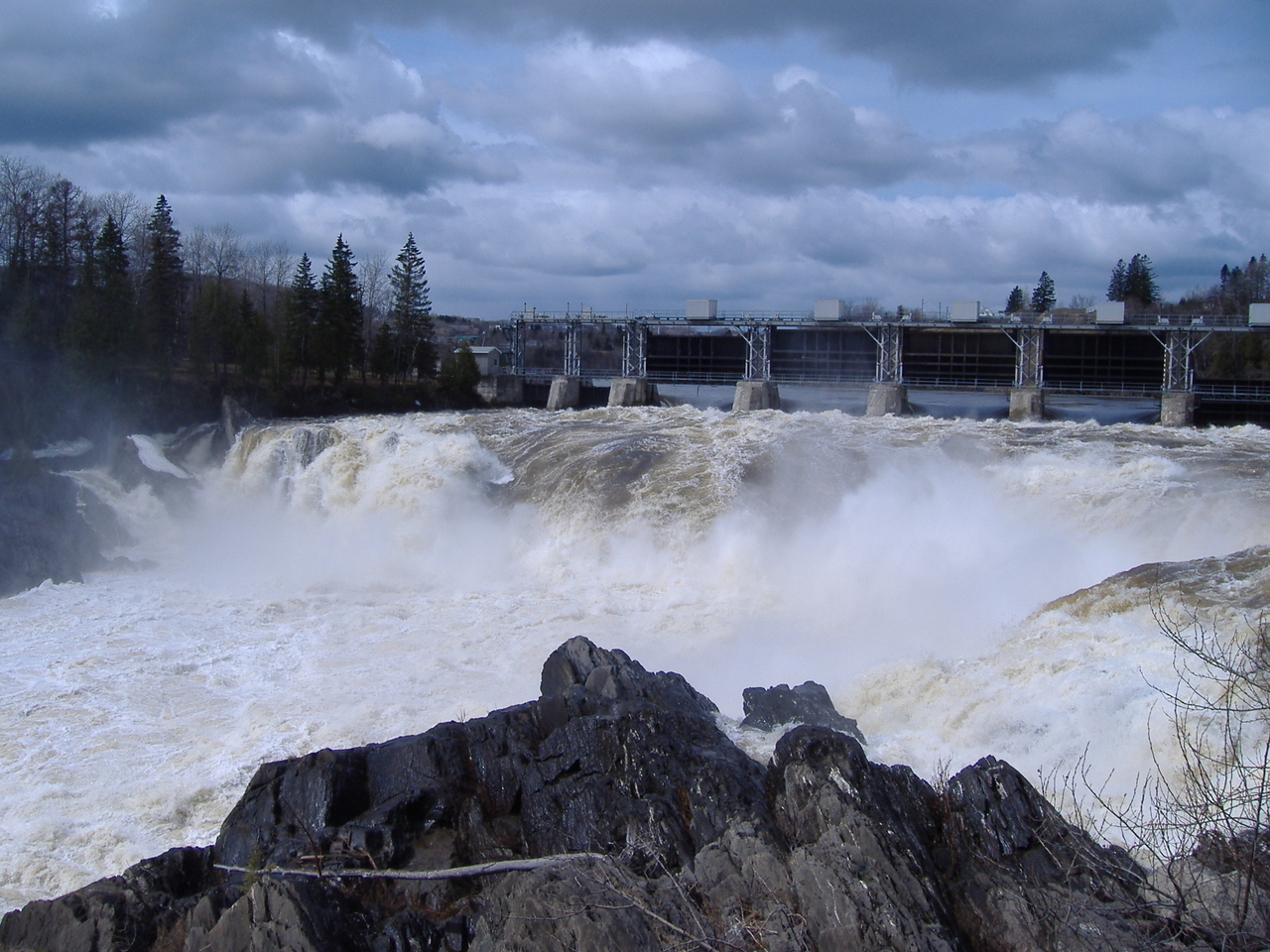
- The floodgates of the Grand Falls generating station.
- Country: Canada
- Location: Grand Falls, New Brunswick
- Coordinates: 47°3′5″N 67°44′24″W
- Commission date: 1931
- Owner: NB Power

Thermal power station
- Turbine technology: Hydroelectric

Power generation
- Units operational: 4 x Francis turbines
- Nameplate capacity: 66 MW

External links
- Commons: Related media on Commons

The Grand Falls Generating Station is a hydroelectric dam built on the Saint John River in Grand Falls in the Canadian province of New Brunswick and is operated by NB Power corporation. It was built from 1925 to 1928 and its power house has a capacity of 66 megawatts with its 4 turbines.
