= Millbank, New Brunswick =

Coordinates: 47°03′43″N 65°27′14″W

Millbank is a small Canadian rural community located in the northeastern part of Northumberland County, New Brunswick.

It is located on the boundary of the city of Miramichi.

== See also ==
- List of communities in New Brunswick
