= Beechwood Dam =

Coordinates: 46°32′30.1″N 67°40′10.7″W

- Beechwood Dam in 2026
- Interactive map of Beechwood Dam
- Country: Canada
- Location: New Brunswick
- Purpose: Power
- Status: Operational
- Opening date: 1955
- Operator: NB Power

Dam and spillways
- Impounds: Saint John River
- Height (foundation): 18 metres (59 ft)
- Elevation at crest: 78 metres (256 ft)

Beechwood Generating Station
- Type: Run-of-the-river
- Hydraulic head: 18 metres (59 ft)
- Turbines: 6 Kaplan turbines
- Pump-generators: 3
- Installed capacity: 113 MW
- Annual generation: 150 GW·h

The Beechwood Dam is a hydroelectric dam built on the Saint John River in the Canadian province of New Brunswick and operated by NB Power corporation. Its power house has a capacity of 113 megawatts.

The dam and power house opened in 1955 in the community of Beechwood, The dam has a head of approximately 18 meters and its upstream reservoir has a relatively small capacity; any significant rainfall or ice jams upstream require NB Power to open flood gates to permit flow through due to this small storage capability. The dam spans the river at Beechwood, NB. Beechwood dam is in Carleton county. NB parish of Kent.

A fish elevator helps migratory fish circumvent the head of the dam.

A giant working floral clock sits nearby in a small park.
