= New Brunswick System Operator =

Logo of the New Brunswick System Operator

The New Brunswick System Operator (NBSO) was an independent not-for-profit statutory corporation created under New Brunswick's Electricity Act on October 1, 2004. Under the Act, the NBSO was responsible for the adequacy and reliability of the integrated electricity system, and for facilitating the development and operation of the New Brunswick Electricity Market. These responsibilities took the form of operation of the NBSO-controlled grid and administration of the Open Access Transmission Tariff (Tariff) and the New Brunswick Electricity Market Rules.

== Dissolution ==
New Brunswick's new Electricity Act (the “Act”) was proclaimed on October 1, 2013. Among other things, the Act saw the amalgamation of the NBSO with the NB Power Group of Companies.

Legislation continues the requirement for open and non–discriminatory transmission access in New Brunswick. The system operation functions that were currently performed by the NBSO are now performed within a vertically integrated NB Power.

NBSO's role in the adoption, monitoring and enforcement of North American reliability standards had been transferred to the New Brunswick Energy and Utilities Board.

== Responsibilities ==
The NBSO was the balancing authority for New Brunswick, Prince Edward Island, and Northern Maine, and the Transmission Provider for New Brunswick. NBSO provided load following and regulation service to the system in order to supply improvince customer load while maintaining scheduled flows on interconnections within established limits. These limits were set out in interconnection agreements with neighbouring system operators.

== Reliability coordination ==
The NBSO was one of 17 Reliability Coordinators in North America. As Reliability Coordinator for the Maritimes Area, NBSO was the authority responsible for the operation of the Bulk Power System in New Brunswick, Nova Scotia, Prince Edward Island, and a portion of northeastern Maine. The NBSO was part of the Northeast Power Coordinating Council, which oversaw electricity reliability in the Northeastern United States, the Maritimes, Quebec, and Ontario.

== See also ==
- Regional transmission organization
