= Belledune =

Village in New Brunswick, Canada

- Village
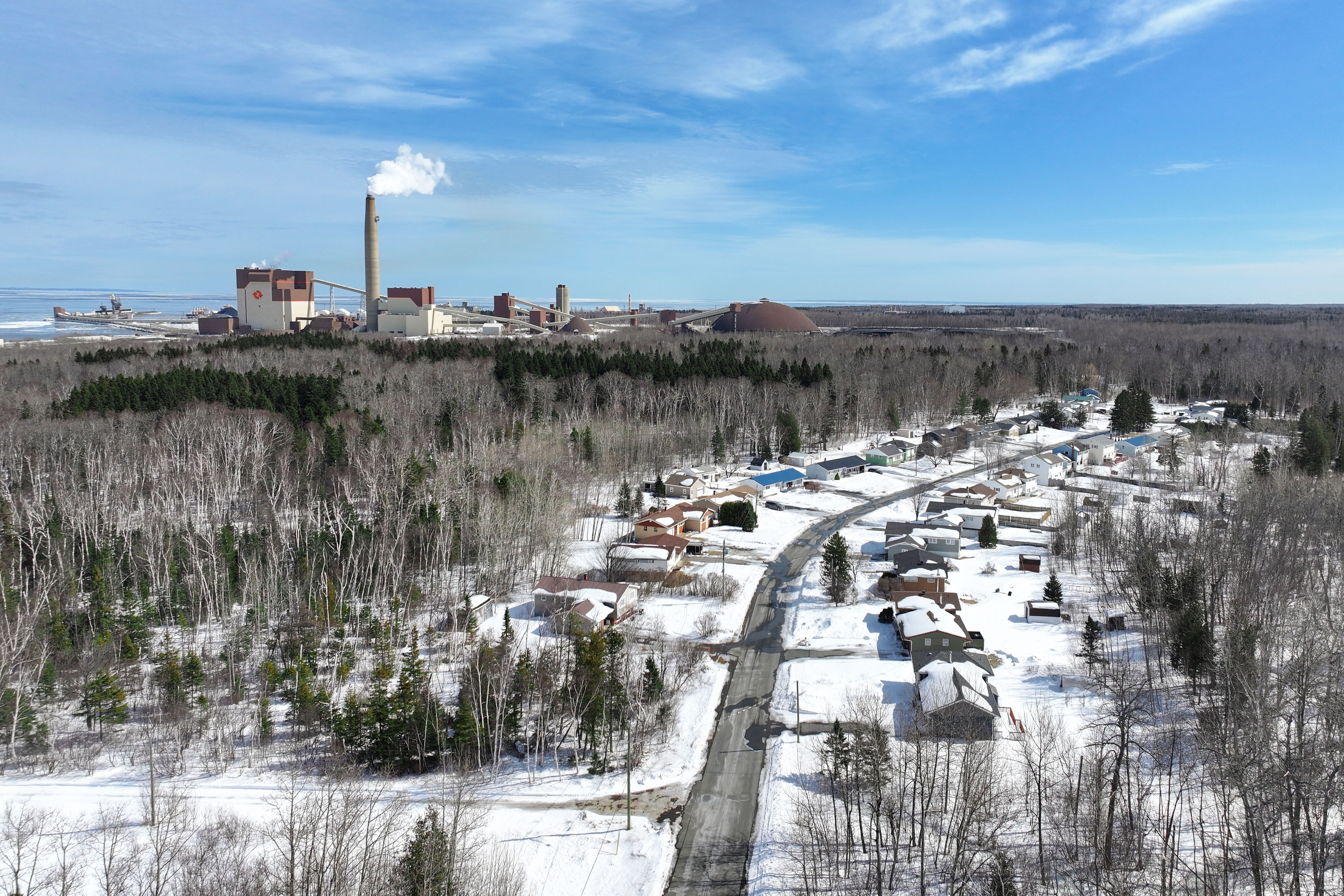
- Aerial view of the village, with Belledune Generating Station in the background, 2025

- Location within New Brunswick
- Coordinates: 47°54′N 65°49′W
- Country: Canada
- Province: New Brunswick
- County: Restigouche; Gloucester
- Parish: Durham; Beresford
- Founded: 1799
- Incorporated: 1968; 58 years ago
- Amalgamation: 1994; 32 years ago

Government
  - Type: Village council
  - Body: Belledune Village Council
  - Mayor: Mario LaPointe

Area
  - Total: 189.18 km^{2} (73.04 sq mi)

Population (2021)
  - Total: 1,325
  - Density: 7/km^{2} (18/sq mi)
  - Percentage change (2016): ▼6.5%
  - Dwellings: 782
- Time zone: UTC-4 (AST)
  - Summer (DST): UTC-3 (ADT)
- Postal code: E8G
- Area code: 506
- Highways: Route 11; Route 134
- Website: belledune.com

Belledune is a port village in the Canadian province of New Brunswick. It has a population of 1,325, and straddles the boundary between Restigouche County and Gloucester County, New Brunswick.

The community of Belledune was created through the amalgamation of Jacquet River, Armstrong Brook, and Belledune in 1994. The community dubbed itself a "Supervillage" after this amalgamation. Belledune's population meets the requirements as a "Town" under the Local Governance Act, but it has not requested a change in municipal status and therefore remains as a village.

Belledune is one of the few municipalities not significantly affected by the province's 2023 local governance reforms.

== History ==
The village, "Big Dune", was first settled by François Joseph Guittard around 1815, with a land grant approval in 1825 for two lots of land of 200 acres each.

Guittard was born in Fauxbourg, St. Antoine, France, around 1774, and after fighting in Napoleon's army, in 1801, he defected to the British Army. Guittard worked as a navigator, and helped map the New Brunswick coastline with the British military.

Guittard and his wife Marie LeFilatre emigrated to Canada, and after a brief settling in Rivière-Ouelle, Quebec, they resettled in New Brunswick, where the promise of a land grant became a possibility.

Settlers from the Miramichi Valley moved towards Belledune after the 1825 Great Miramichi Fire.

== Politics ==
List of Mayors of Belledune
| Mayor | Term | Party | References |
|---|---|---|---|
| Delphis Hickey | 1969 – May 10, 1977 | Independent | |
| J. Arnold Talbot | May 10, 1977 – May 14, 1980 | Independent | |
| John McDonnell | May 14, 1980 – May 1986 | Independent | |
| Joseph H. Hodgins | May 1986 – May 8, 1989 | Independent | |
| Andy Flanagan | May 8, 1989 – May 14, 2001 | Independent | |
| Joseph R. Noël | May 14, 2001 – May 10, 2004 | Independent | |
| Nick Duivenvoorden | May 10, 2004 – May 14, 2012 | Independent | |
| Ron Bourque | May 14, 2012 – May 9, 2016 | Independent | |
| Joseph R. Noël | May 9, 2016 – May 10, 2021 | Independent | |
| Paul A. Arseneault | May 10, 2021 – May 11, 2026 | Independent | |
| Mario LaPointe | May 11, 2026 – present | Independent | |

== Economy ==
Belledune underwent unprecedented development during the 1960s when under the premiership of Louis Robichaud a major regional port was built to service various industries on the north shore of New Brunswick.

The first major industrial projects at the port included in 1966 a lead and zinc smelter, formerly Brunswick Mining and Smelting Corporation, but now owned by Glencore with a nominal production of 120,000 tonnes per year. built in support of the lead and zinc mines opened south of Bathurst during the 1950s in the Bathurst Mining Camp. A $30 million venture at the time, the smelter has managed to extract silver from its imported silver lead concentrates, and in 2011 produced 400mt of pure silver valued at 448M$; the company proposes to increase its silver production to 700mt. The current permit to operate is file number I-7107.

NB Power opened the Belledune Generating Station, a coal-fired thermal generating station, at the port in 1993.

The announcement of the closure of the Glencore smelter was issued in late 2019. At that time, the company workforce was on strike. The site decommissioning will continue to 2028.

== Demographics ==
In the 2021 Census of Population conducted by Statistics Canada, Belledune had a population of 1,325 living in 688 of its 782 total private dwellings, a change of −6.5% from its 2016 population of 1,417. With a land area of 189.18 km^{2} (73.04 sq mi), it had a population density of 7.0/km^{2} (18.1/sq mi) in 2021.

Canada census – Belledune community profile

| | 2021 | 2011 |
| Population | 1,325 (-6.5% from 2016) | 1,548 (-9.5% from 2006) |
| Land area | 189.18 km^{2} (73.04 sq mi) | 189.33 km^{2} (73.10 sq mi) |
| Population density | 7/km^{2} (18/sq mi) | 8.2/km^{2} (21/sq mi) |
| Median age | 59.2 (M: 58.4, F: 59.6) | 53.2 (M: 53.1, F: 53.2) |
| Private dwellings | 782 (total) 688 (occupied) | 851 (total) |
| Median household income | $48,400 | $40,129 |

References: 2021 2011

Historical Census Data - Belledune, New Brunswick

| Year | Pop. | ±% |
|---|---|---|
| 1991 | 2,087 | — |
| 1996 | 2,060 | −1.3% |
| 2001 | 1,923 | −6.7% |

| Year | Pop. | ±% |
|---|---|---|
| 2006 | 1,711 | −11.0% |
| 2011 | 1,548 | −9.5% |
| 2016 | 1,417 | −8.5% |

| Year | Pop. | ±% |
|---|---|---|
| 2021 | 1,325 | −6.5% |

=== Language ===
Canada Census Mother Tongue - Belledune, New Brunswick
| Census | Total | English | | | French | | | English & French | | | Other | | |
| Year | Responses | Count | Trend | Pop % | Count | Trend | Pop % | Count | Trend | Pop % | Count | Trend | Pop % |
| 2011 | 1,550 | 1,285 | ▼13.2% | 82.90% | 235 | ▲14.6% | 15.16% | 25 | ▲25.0% | 1.61% | 5 | ▲ n/a% | 0.32% |
| 2006 | 1,705 | 1,480 | ▼13.4% | 86.80% | 205 | ▼6.8% | 12.02% | 20 | ▲100.0% | 1.17% | 0 | 0.0% | 0.00% |
| 2001 | 1,940 | 1,710 | ▼3.9% | 88.14% | 220 | ▼15.4% | 11.34% | 10 | ▼71.4% | 0.52% | 0 | 0.0% | 0.00% |
| 1996 | 2,075 | 1,780 | n/a | 85.78% | 260 | n/a | 12.53% | 35 | n/a | 1.69% | 0 | n/a | 0.00% |

== See also ==
- Port of Belledune
- List of municipalities in New Brunswick
