= Point Lepreau Nuclear Generating Station =

Nuclear power plant in New Brunswick, Canada. CANDU reactor

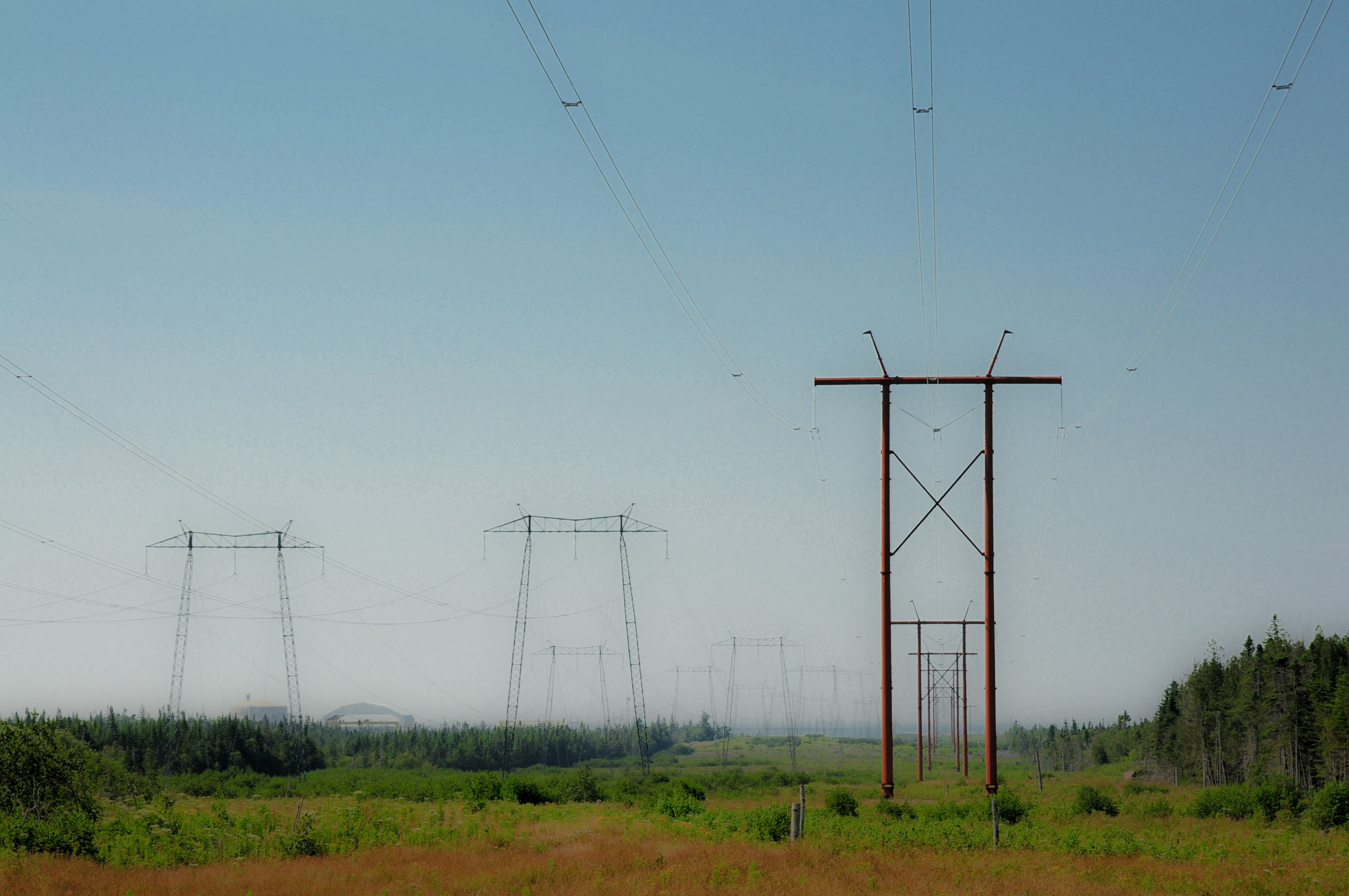
- Transmission lines leading to the Point Lepreau Nuclear Generating Station in background at left.
- Official name: centrale nucléaire de Point Lepreau
- Country: Canada
- Location: Point Lepreau, Musquash Parish, New Brunswick
- Coordinates: 45°04′08″N 66°27′17″W
- Status: Operating. Reactivated to full service 23 November 2012 after undergoing Life Extension Project since March 2008.
- Construction began: 1 May 1975
- Commission date: 1 February 1983
- Construction cost: C$1.4 billion (1983)
- Owner: NB Power
- Operator: NB Power

Nuclear power station
- Reactor type: CANDU PHWR
- Reactor supplier: AECL
- Cooling source: Atlantic Ocean
- Thermal capacity: 2064 MW_{th}

Power generation
- Units operational: 1 × 660 MW
- Make and model: CANDU C6
- Nameplate capacity: 660 MW
- Capacity factor: 70.85% (lifetime); 78.68% (2013+)
- Annual net output: 4801 GWe·h (2020); 168,131 GW·h (lifetime)

External links
- Website: NB Power - Nuclear Powering the Future - Point Lepreau Refurbishment Project
- Commons: Related media on Commons

Point Lepreau Nuclear Generating Station is a nuclear power station located 2 km northeast of Point Lepreau, New Brunswick, Canada. The facility was constructed between 1975 and 1983 by NB Power, the provincially owned public utility.

The facility is located on the northern shore of the Bay of Fundy and derives its name from the nearby headland situated at the easternmost part of Charlotte County, although the generating station itself is located within Saint John County. The generating station is administratively part of the local service district of Musquash, west of the city of Saint John.

The Point Lepreau Nuclear Generating Station is the only nuclear generating facility located in Atlantic Canada and the only operating Canadian nuclear power station located outside of Ontario. The facility consists of a single CANDU nuclear reactor, having a net capacity of 660 MW (705 MW gross).

== History ==
=== Construction ===
The construction of a nuclear powered electrical generating station in New Brunswick had been discussed since the late 1950s. For over fifteen years, engineers from the New Brunswick Electric Power Commission (Note: The company was renamed Énergie NB Power in the 1970s.) visited AECL's Chalk River Laboratories to keep abreast of the latest trends in the field. Formal talks between the Government of New Brunswick and the Government of Canada began in 1972. Discussions accelerated the next year, in the midst of the 1973 oil crisis, as the provincial government began to seriously consider options for diversifying New Brunswick's electrical generation and reduce its reliance on oil. However, financing the venture was a problem since the province had a limited borrowing capacity.

The borrowing capacity was solved by the federal government in January 1974 with the announcement of a loan program covering half the costs of a first nuclear plant in any province in Canada. Premier Richard Hatfield announced his intention to build a nuclear generating station in New Brunswick on 5 February 1974. Hatfield's Progressive Conservative Party was reelected in that fall's general election, despite misgivings of the nuclear generation plan by part of the population. In March 1975, Hatfield declared on television that the decision was final, and that the reactor would be built regardless of the ongoing environmental assessment process, in a move described by New Brunswick sociologist Ronald Babin as the "nuclear fait accompli policy".

On 2 May 1975, the Atomic Energy Control Board authorized the construction of two 635-MW reactors on a site designed to host four in Point Lepreau, 20 km west of Saint John, New Brunswick's largest city at the time. The New Brunswick Electric Power Commission began the construction of one reactor, with an option for a second one.

At its peak in 1979, the construction project employed 3,500 workers; 108 individual contracts out of 139 were granted to local businesses. Point Lepreau was licensed for operation on 21 July 1982, achieved criticality four days later and began commercial operations on 1 February 1983.

The high rate of inflation over the life of the construction project, tense labour relations on the worksite and skyrocketing construction costs - all common traits of large public infrastructure projects of that period - tripled the early cost forecast in nominal terms. The estimated cost of C$466 million in 1974 increased to C$684 two years later and to C$895 in 1978. At the time of its commissioning in 1983, the total cost was estimated at C$1.4 billion, excluding interest charges.

Point Lepreau was finished in 1981. It operated until 2008, when it closed for a refurbishment until 23 October 2012, when it was first re-connected to the grid. This is the only operating nuclear reactor in Canada outside Ontario.

This was the only CANDU reactor built on the east coast of Canada; other CANDUs are in Argentina, South Korea, India, Pakistan, Romania and China.

=== Expansion plans considered ===
In 2007, Team CANDU, a consortium of Atomic Energy of Canada Limited, Babcock & Wilcox Canada, GE-Hitachi Nuclear Energy Canada Inc., Hitachi Canada Ltd and SNC-Lavalin Nuclear Limited began a $2.5 million feasibility study regarding the installation of a new 1,100 MWe Advanced CANDU Reactor at Point Lepreau, to supply power to New England.

In July 2010, the Government of New Brunswick, led at that time by the Liberal Party, signed an agreement with French nuclear manufacturer Areva to study the feasibility of a new light water nuclear plant on the Point Lepreau property. In September 2010 the Progressive Conservative Party gained power and the plan was shelved by the incoming premier shortly after the election.

=== 2008-2012 refurbishment project ===
==== Public debate ====
Point Lepreau's CANDU-6 reactor was designed to last 25 years and was scheduled to be mothballed by 2008. Public debate on the future of the plant began as early as 2000. At the time, NB Power estimated the refurbishment cost at C$750 million.

In 2002, NB Power, with support from the Government and opposition, pushed for refurbishment. However, the New Brunswick Energy and Utilities Board ruled that "there is no significant economic advantage to the proposed refurbishment" of Point Lepreau and that "it is not in the public interest".

In April 2004, a report authored by former British Energy chairman Robin Jeffrey estimated the plant's refurbishment would cost $1.36 billion instead of the C$935 million figure quoted at the time by the provincial utility. Jeffrey's report made no recommendations on whether to undertake the plant's overhaul or not but advised New Brunswick decision makers to seek competitive bids for new fossil-fuel fired generation capacity.

Despite being denied a federal grant to fund the project, NB Power announced on 29 July 2005 that it was awarding Atomic Energy of Canada Limited a $1.4 billion (CAD) contract for refurbishing the generating station.

==== Refurbishment work ====
The refurbishment of the power station began on 28 March 2008 and was originally scheduled to last 18 months with AECL as the lead contractor on the project, but the operation was marred by technical glitches, delays and incidents. For instance, two 115-tonne turbine rotors, (not part of the AECL contract) worth C$10 million each, toppled a barge in Saint John Harbour while being transported to the plant on 15 October 2008. The part manufacturer, Siemens Canada Ltd., eventually sued four companies in an Ontario court, including J. D. Irving Ltd., for "gross negligence" in the incident.

Estimates for the reopening of the plant had been revised several times. In January 2009, a 3-month delay was announced because of problems with the robotic equipment used to remove pressure tubes. A second, 4-month delay was announced in July of the same year. In October 2009, New Brunswick minister of Energy, Jack Keir, announced a tentative reopening by February 2011 and asked for federal money to cope with the unexpected cost of purchased power to replace the power ordinarily generated by the plant. The situation is compounded by the strategic importance of the plant in NB Power supply plans, since Point Lepreau provides 4 TWh/year or between 25 and 30% of the provincial output.

It was announced on 29 October 2009 that the Point Lepreau Nuclear Generating Station would be one of the assets that were to be included in the proposed sale of NB Power to Hydro-Québec. On 24 March 2010 Premier Shawn Graham announced that the proposed sale had fallen through, citing Hydro-Québec's "concerns about unanticipated costs". Graham's announcement was contested by analysts who blamed the collapse of the deal on the difficult political situation in New Brunswick, six months before a scheduled provincial election.

According to leaked internal documents, the proposed sale of NB Power and a proposed post-refurbishment staff reorganization of the company had a negative impact on workers' morale at the Point Lepreau Nuclear Generating Station and was becoming a safety concern. Over 600 workplace injuries occurred at Point Lepreau between January 2009 and June 2010, including 7 "lost time", 13 "restricted work" injuries and 32 incidents requiring medical aid. According to the internal reports, delays were costing NB Power C$33 million a month: "C$11 million in capital costs and C$22 million for replacement power and interest".

On 9 October 2010, NB Power announced that AECL would have to remove all 380 calandria tubes from the reactor and reinstall them a second time, an operation which took a year earlier in the refurbishment program. The calandria tubes, roughly 7 m (23 ft) long and 13 cm (5.1 in) diameter, form the boundary to the moderator tank (calandria) through which the fuel channels are installed. According to an internal report dated 30 June 2010, the problem "is likely the result of damage to the tube sheet bores caused by the cleaning operation in a previous work series". According to an October 2010 estimate, the generating station was scheduled to be back on stream in the fall of 2012, three years later than first expected.

First re-connected to the grid on 23 October 2012, on 23 November 2012 Point Lepreau restarted commercial power production with a final refurbishment cost approximately "$1 billion over its original budget". Pt. Lepreau Nuclear Generating Station was the first CANDU-6 reactor in the world to undergo full refurbishment, and the lessons learned from that project benefitted subsequent CANDU-6 refurbishment projects worldwide.

=== Advanced Small Modular Reactors ===
On 26 June 2018, the government of New Brunswick committed 10 million dollars toward the establishment of an advanced Small Modular Reactor Research Cluster. This was followed by announcements of the participation of ARC Nuclear (9 July 2018) and Moltex Energy (13 July 2018), each investing 5 million dollars to progress research and development of their advanced technologies. Since that time significant development has taken place, including discussions on establishing a supply chain within the province.

As indicated on 25 July 2019, NB Power envisions commercial demonstrations of both reactor types at the Point Lepreau site if these advanced technologies successfully complete Phase 2 of the CNSC Vendor Design review and their financial and project planning predictions continue to show promise.

New Brunswick participated in the development of the Pan-Canadian SMR Roadmap (November 2018), and is also collaborating with the provinces of Ontario and Saskatchewan pertaining to the development of deployment of Small Modular Reactor technologies as part of the Interprovincial MOU announced in December 2019.

In March 2019, a consortium involving NB Power, the Government of New Brunswick, ARC Nuclear, and Moltex Energy announced plans to develop small modular reactors at the Point Lepreau site. This was furthered when, in December 2019, the governments of New Brunswick, Ontario, and Saskatchewan announced a collaboration deal on the development of small modular reactors.

== Operations ==
The Point Lepreau Nuclear Generating Station achieved record levels of availability with a 10-year average of 93.11% and generated over 5,000 GWh/year of energy on a sustained basis for its first decade of operations. However, numerous problems started to surface in the mid to late 1990s, due to poor maintenance and low investment. In mid-January 1997, a leak near the reactor core forced a third shutdown in 2 years. The 75-day stoppage was caused by a cracked feeder pipe. The human error cost C$40 million in repairs and C$450,000/day to purchase replacement power from Quebec.

=== Incidents ===
On 5 March 1990, assistant plant operator Daniel George Maston was criminally charged with causing a noxious substance to be administered with the intent to cause bodily harm, because he had removed slightly radioactive heavy water from the moderator system and added it to a cafeteria drink dispenser. Eight employees drank some of the contaminated water; one received more than four times the legal yearly limit for radiation. However, none experienced significant health effects. On 2 October 1990, Maston pled guilty, describing his act as a bad joke without "a good reason".

In 1995, a plywood cover was left in the boiler after completion of a maintenance outage. When the heat transport pumps were restarted, the cover was sucked into the heat transport system where it caused catastrophic damage to one of the pumps. The cause of the incident was lack of control of temporary modifications, poor work management, lack of foreign material exclusion (FME) measures, and human error. There was no public safety significance to the event, since the reactor had been shut down long enough that decay heat power was below the level that required coolant flow. However, the breach of the pressure boundary at the damaged pump created a radiation hazard for workers, and debris in feeders, fuel channels and potentially other Heat Transport and Auxiliaries pipework could have created a significant safety hazard during at-power operation. The cost of pump repairs, and the production downtime caused by the incident and its cleanup, was significant. The incident also left wood and metal debris unrecoverable in the cooling system. Maintenance incidents at Lepreau in 1995 cost the facility more than $50 million in repairs and replacement power.

In 2011, a spill of heavy water in the reactor building triggered a radiation alert and evacuation. NB Power stated that the event did not pose significant impact to the public or environment. This was the first time the reactor building had ever been evacuated.

== Electrical output ==
The graph represents the annual electricity generation at the site in GWh. As of June 2026, the amount of electricity supplied by the plant over its lifetime is 175.33 TW.h.

== See also ==
- List of Canadian nuclear generating stations
- CANDU reactor
- Nuclear power in Canada
- NB Power
