= Orimulsion =

Registered trademark name for a bitumen-based fuel

Orimulsion is a registered trademark name for a bitumen-based fuel that was developed for industrial use by Intevep, the Research and Development Affiliate of Petroleos de Venezuela SA (PDVSA), following earlier collaboration on oil emulsions with BP.

== Source of the bitumen ==
Like coal and oil, bitumen occurs naturally and is obtained from the world's largest deposit in the Orinoco Belt in Venezuela. The deposit is estimated to be more than 1.3 trillion barrels (190 billion m^{3}) of bitumen, an amount approximately equivalent to the world's estimated proven oil reserves.

== Preparation ==
Raw bitumen has an extremely high viscosity and specific gravity between 8 and 10 API gravity at ambient temperatures, making it unsuitable for direct use in conventional power stations. Orimulsion is produced by mixing the bitumen with approximately 30% fresh water and a small amount of an alcohol-based surfactant. Earlier versions used a phenol-based surfactant, which suffered from human health concerns while also delivering less efficient transport properties of the fuel.

== Advantages ==
As a fuel for electricity generation, Orimulsion has a number of attractive characteristics:

- the known reserves of bitumen are very large;
- it is currently priced to be competitive with internationally traded coal;
- it is relatively easy and safe to produce, transport, handle and store;
- it is easy to ignite and has good combustion characteristics;
- it can be used in power stations designed to run on coal or heavy fuel oil, with suitable modification.

== Disadvantages ==
While Orimulsion is little different to fuel oil in relation to environmental impacts when burnt, being similarly susceptible to pollution mitigation techniques, it is more problematic in spill situations. If a spill occurs during shipping over water, the Orimulsion mixture de-emulsifies, causing the bitumen to separate and no longer remain in suspension.

Orimulsion is classified as a non-Newtonian fluid, and if its temperature drops below 30 °C, it undergoes a process referred to as 'setting'. Once set, it becomes extremely difficult to pump, and restarting operations or restoring the flow through the pipeline becomes impossible.

== Decreasing usage ==
Orimulsion is currently used as a commercial boiler fuel in power plants worldwide, including countries such as Japan, Italy and China. Its usage was previously more widespread, and there was an increasing demand for it. However, following the Venezuelan general strike of 2002–03, many engineers from PDVSA were dismissed. Since Orimulsion had been highly regarded by these engineers, it lost favor among key political leaders. Consequently, the Venezuelan government has been attempting to gradually phase out the Orimulsion program, except for its sales to China. The Venezuelan government maintains close ties with China, similar to its relationship with Cuba. As a result, China continues to receive supplies of Orimulsion, while the rest of the world either had their supply terminated or is still in the process of winding down. Despite these developments, Orimulsion still holds great potential for domestic consumption.

Another reason given by current PDVSA management is that with rising crude oil prices, it has been found that mixing or diluting Orinoco bitumen (extra-heavy oil) with a lighter crude oil can make this blend more profitable as a crude oil on the world market than by selling it as Orimulsion. An example of this is the popular Merey blend (Orinoco bitumen and Mesa crude oil). ConocoPhillips along with PDVSA operate the Merey Sweeny 58,000-barrel-per-day (9,200 m^{3}/d) (bpd) delayed coker, vacuum tower and related facilities at ConocoPhillips' refinery in Sweeny, Texas, U.S.A. for processing and upgrading heavy sour Merey crude oil.

Air pollutant control technology that is commonly available can limit emissions from Orimulsion to levels considered "Best Available Control Technology", as defined by the United States Environmental Protection Agency.
