= NB Power =

Electric utility company

New Brunswick Power Corporation
- Trade name: NB Power; Énergie NB
- Native name: Société d’énergie du Nouveau-Brunswick
- Formerly: New Brunswick Electric Power Commission
- Type: Crown corporation
- Industry: Electricity generation, transmission and distribution
- Founded: April 29, 1920
- Headquarters: Fredericton, New Brunswick, Canada
- Area served: New Brunswick
- Key people: Lori Clark (President and CEO)
- Services: Electricity
- Revenue: ▲CA$2,198 million (2022)
- Operating income: ▲CA$283 million (2022)
- Net income: ▲CA$80 million (2022)
- Total assets: ▲CA$7,935 million (2022)
- Total equity: ▼CA$174 million (2010)
- Number of employees: 2,500+ (2020)
- Website: www.nbpower.com

New Brunswick Power Corporation (French: Société d’énergie du Nouveau-Brunswick), operating as NB Power (French: Énergie NB), is the primary electric utility in the Canadian province of New Brunswick. NB Power is a vertically-integrated Crown corporation by the government of New Brunswick and is responsible for the generation, transmission, and distribution of electricity. NB Power serves all the residential and industrial power consumers in New Brunswick, with the exception of those in Saint John, Edmundston and Perth-Andover who are served by Saint John Energy, Energy Edmundston, and the Perth-Andover Electric Light Commission, respectively.

== History ==
The development of the electricity industry in New Brunswick started the 1880s with the establishment of small private power plants in Saint John, Fredericton and Moncton. Over the next 30 years, other cities successively electrified, so much so that in 1918, more than 20 companies were active in the electricity business, which left the province with wildly differing levels of services and prices. In Saint John for instance, the rates fluctuated between 7.5 and 15 cents per kilowatt-hour, depending on the location and the monthly consumption.

=== Interwar period ===
Recognizing the important role that electricity was about to play in economic development, Premier Walter E. Foster proposed the creation of a provincially owned electric company. The Legislative Assembly passed a bill to that effect. The New Brunswick Electric Power Commission (NBEPC) was created on April 24, 1920, under the ministry of Peter Veniot (Public Works). Immediately, the commission, headed by its first president, C. W. Robinson, launched the construction of a C$2 million hydroelectric dam at Musquash, west of Saint John. To supply the cities of Saint John, Moncton and Sussex, a 88 miles (142 km) long high voltage power line was also built.

The new earth dam was completed on time, in 1922. But it could not withstand the 1923 spring flood and collapsed, an accident which shattered a bit of confidence in the new commission. The building of a larger facility in Grand Falls, on the Upper Saint John River, was undertaken in 1926 by a subsidiary of International Paper Company and completed in 1930. Electricity demand increased during that decade and more generation facilities were required to supply the province. The commission decided to take advantage of coal resources in the Minto area and built a plant near the mines. The Grand Lake Generating Station was commissioned in 1931 and then expanded five years later.

=== Post-war era ===
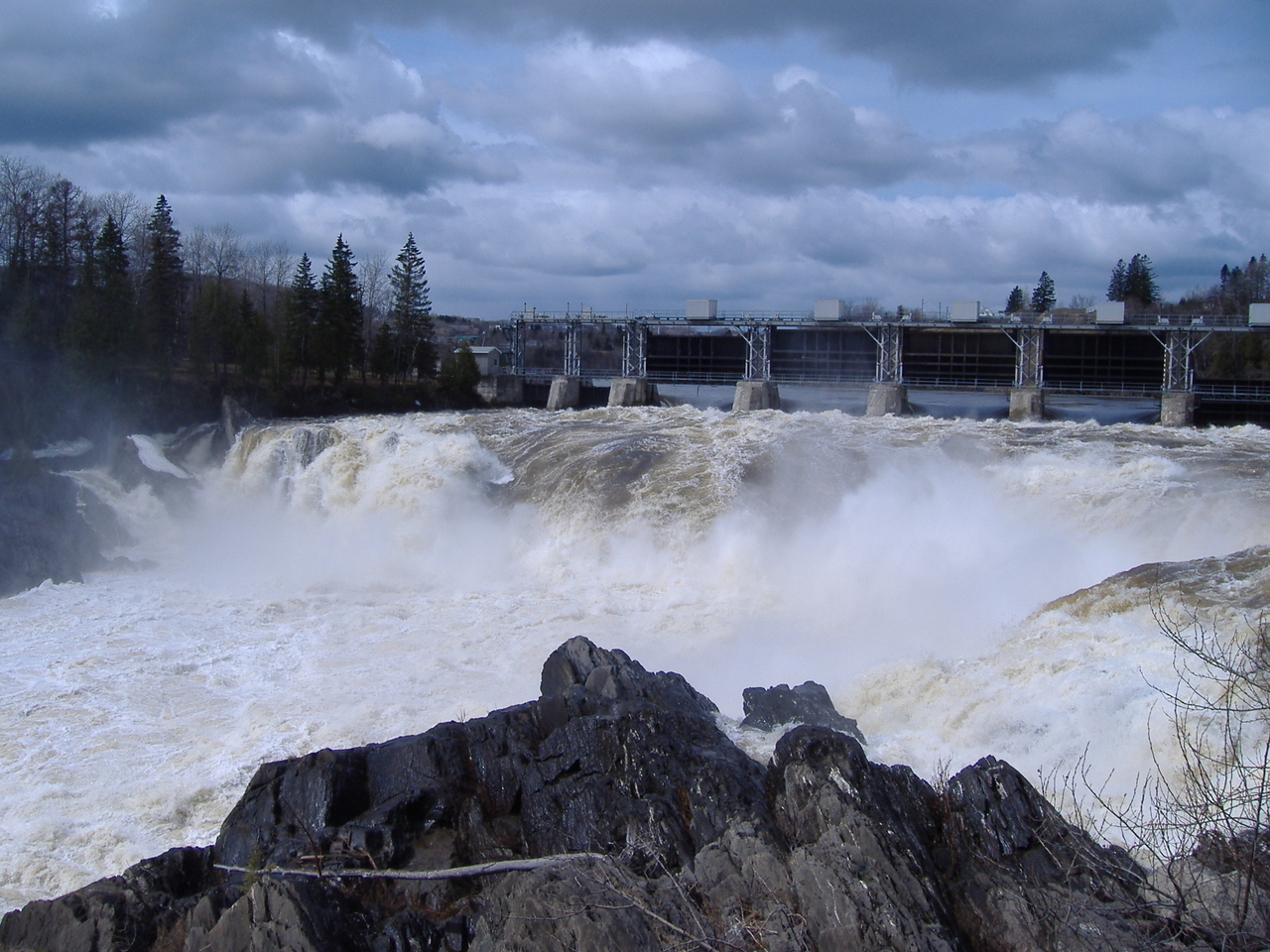
The floodgates of the Grand Falls generating station, during the annual freshet of the Saint John River.

Demand for electricity exploded during World War II and led to rationing in the late 1940s. Meanwhile, the commission embarked on the construction of two major dams on the Saint John River, the Tobique and Beechwood generating stations, which were respectively commissioned in 1953 and 1955. See below regarding First Nations relations.

The New Brunswick Electric Power Commission bought the Grand Falls Generating Station in 1959 and began work on the province's largest hydroelectric facility, the Mactaquac dam, whose first three units were put on stream in 1968.

However, the new hydroelectric developments proved insufficient to bridge the imbalance between supply and demand, which grew by 12% per annum between 1960 and 1975. To cope with this demand growth, the commission began construction of the oil-fired Courtenay Bay Generating Station, near the Saint John shipyard in 1959; it was also adjacent to the Irving Oil Refinery, which entered service in the late 1950s and which the Courtenay Bay Generating Station made use of a pipeline running from the Canaport offshore loading facility at Red Head to the refinery. The first 50 MW turbine was put in service at Courtenay Bay Generating Station the next year, in December 1960, while two more units were added in 1965 and 1966, 50 MW and 100 MW, respectively. To better serve northern New Brunswick, another oil-fired plant, the Dalhousie Generating Station, was constructed in Darlington with an initial capacity of 100 MW. It was commissioned in 1969.

In the early 1970s, the NBEPC signed a series of supply contracts with New England distributors, justifying the construction of its largest power plant in 1972. With three 335 MW units, the oil-fired Coleson Cove Generating Station was completed in January 1977. However, the 1973 oil shock made the operation of thermal plants more expensive, since oil prices rose from US$3 to US$37 per barrel between 1973 and 1982. The company, which was renamed NB Power / Énergie NB during that time, needed to explore other generating options.

=== 1974-1983: Point Lepreau ===
The construction of a nuclear plant in New Brunswick had been discussed since the late 1950s. For over 15 years, engineers from the NBEPC visited the Chalk River Laboratories to keep abreast of the latest trends in the field. Formal talks between the provincial and federal governments began in 1972 and discussions between representatives of Premier Richard Hatfield and Atomic Energy of Canada accelerated the following year. In the aftermath of the oil crisis, the province wanted to secure a source of electricity whose prices would be less volatile than oil. However, project financing was still an issue.

The federal government then announced a loan program to help provinces such as New Brunswick in January 1974. Ottawa's pledge to cover half of the cost of a first nuclear plant removed the last obstacle to construction of the Point Lepreau Nuclear Generating Station. On February 5, 1974, Hatfield announced his decision to build the plant, 20 miles (32 km) west of Saint John, and even raised the possibility of constructing a second one in the future. On May 2, 1975, the Canadian Atomic Energy Commission authorized the construction of two 640-MW units within a site that can accommodate a maximum of four reactors.

Labour unrest, design problems and skyrocketing construction costs significantly increased the plant's price tag. The total price of the first operational CANDU-6 in the world was estimated at 466 million dollars in 1974. Inflation between 1978 and 1982 was 46%, this increased the costs for all infrastructure projects in Canada. Projects like Darlington Nuclear Generating Station and Point Lepreau had priced their estimates before the inflation. When it became operational 8 years later, on February 1, 1983, the cost had soared to C$1.4 billion.

=== 2009 Proposed sale to Hydro-Québec ===
On October 29, 2009, the premiers of New Brunswick and Quebec signed a memorandum of understanding to sell most of NB Power's assets to Hydro-Québec. This agreement was reached after nine months of negotiations undertaken at the request of New Brunswick and would have transferred most generation, transmission and distribution assets of the New Brunswick utility to a subsidiary of the Quebec-based Crown corporation, including the Point Lepreau Nuclear Generating Station and 7 hydroelectric plants, but would have excluded fossil-fuel fired plants in Dalhousie, Belledune, and Coleson Cove.

The memorandum of understanding fostered a spirited public debate in New Brunswick and Atlantic Canada. Despite positive feedback from the province's business leaders, many reactions to the MOU were hostile. Opposition parties, Newfoundland and Labrador premier Danny Williams, the union representing most NB Power employees, and wind energy supporters quickly condemned the agreement as detrimental to the interests of New Brunswick.

Opponents in the general public used social media to show their displeasure and contest the various arguments for the deal. On Facebook, 14,000 people joined a group in opposition to the sale within five days of the announcement. A demonstration organized by the group and trade unions drew approximately 600 people outside the Legislative Assembly building on November 17, 2009. A Leger Marketing opinion poll conducted on behalf of Quebecor Media newspapers in New Brunswick and Quebec in November 2009 showed that 60% of New Brunswickers polled opposed the proposed sale, while 22% supported it.

After months of controversy, New Brunswick and Quebec representatives signed a second agreement in January 2010, reducing the scope of the sale. Under the revised agreement, the sale would have transferred NB Power's hydroelectric and nuclear power plants to Hydro-Quebec for C$3.4 billion. The government of New Brunswick would have retained the transmission and distribution divisions of NB Power, and the Crown corporation would have entered into a long-term power purchase agreement (PPA) with Hydro-Québec. The PPA would have allowed NB Power to deliver the rate freeze for residential and general customers. However, the industrial rates rollback would have been smaller than under the original MOU.

On March 24, 2010, Premier Graham announced the failure of the second agreement due to Hydro-Québec's concern over unanticipated risks and costs associated with matters including dam security and water levels. This interpretation was contested by analysts, who blamed the collapse of the deal on the political situation in New Brunswick.

=== 2023: Higgs and Holland chart the future ===
In 2023, premier Blaine Higgs and energy minister Mike Holland released Powering our Economy and the World with Clean Energy – Our Path Forward to 2035. This 55-page document charts the path to be taken by the province over the next decade. Climate change and green house gases (GHGs) figured prominently in the rationale for change in favour of nuclear small modular reactors (SMRs), "to net-zero". Higgs and Holland wrote that "we have a generational opportunity in front of us to change the way we use energy to live and work that will lead to a cleaner environment while also creating an economic growth engine for our province."

== Corporate structure ==
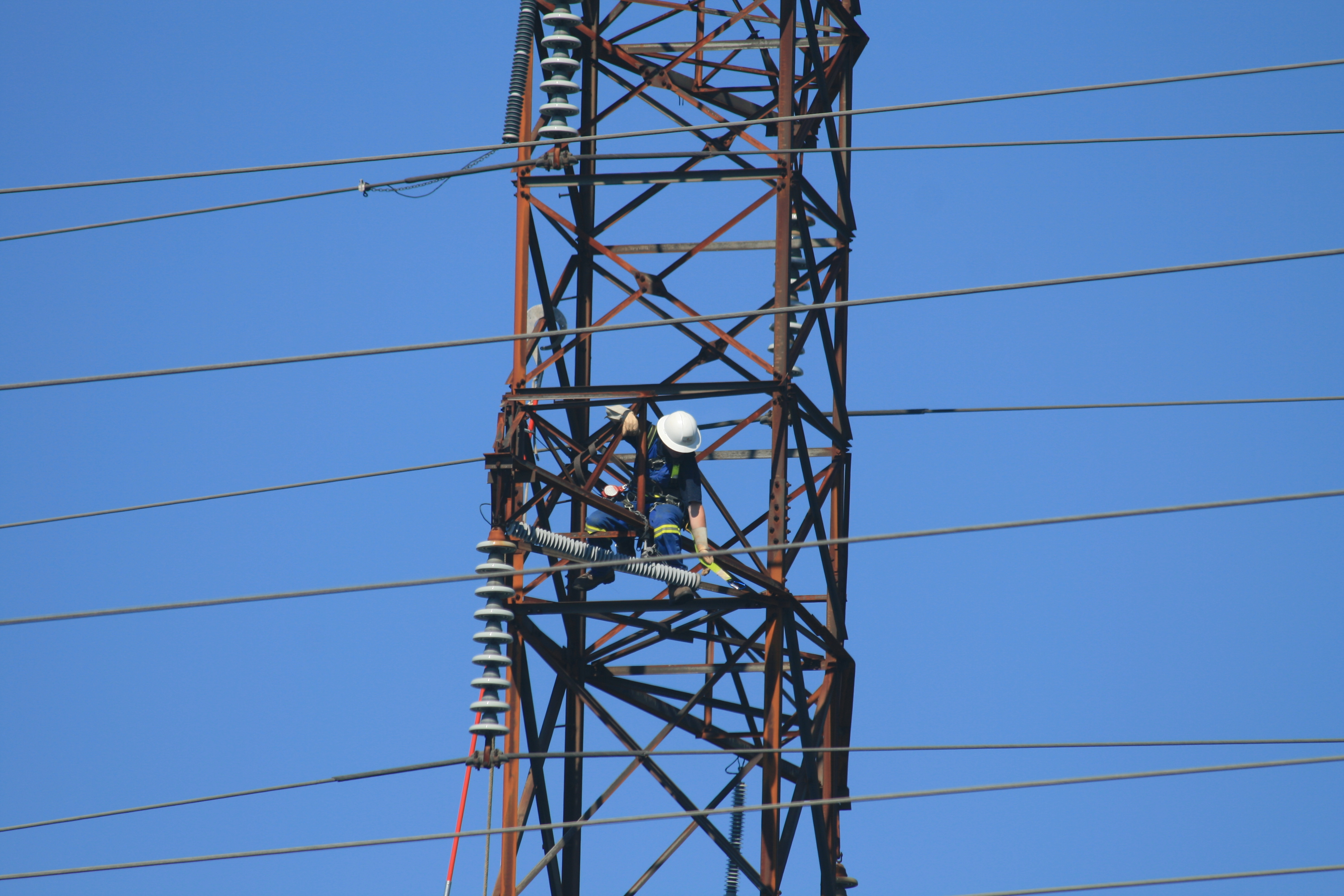
A NB Power lineman working on a transmission tower in Saint John.

The future of NB Power has been a concern of successive New Brunswick governments for the past 15 years. The Liberal government of Raymond Frenette published a consultation document in February 1998 to find solutions to ensure the sustainability of NB Power in the twenty-first century.

=== Valuation ===
Shortly after taking office in 1999, the Conservative government of Bernard Lord commissioned TD Securities to conduct an assessment of the company's viability. The study, whose findings were published in 2009, suggested four scenarios: the status quo; a sale to a strategic buyer; privatization through a share offering; or splitting the utility into separate elements. The report valued the company at between $C3.6 and $C4.5 billion. This number however was very strongly contested by those familiar with the value of telecommunications rights of way and smart grid-based services, energy-related and otherwise, who considered the distribution network to have very much more value. These arguments were to be repeated often in the 2009-2010 NB Power controversy.

Between 2001 and 2004, the Lord government spent C$3.2 million to retain the services of CIBC World Markets and Salomon Smith Barney in order to evaluate the resale value of the Point Lepreau and Coleson Cove power plants. The studies, codenamed Cartwheel and Lighthouse, have assessed the value of these assets to roughly C$4.1 billion. A similar valuation was used in the failed 2010 proposal to vend Lepreau to Hydro-Quebec, and was extremely controversial.

=== 2003 reorganization ===
The Lord government shuffled the company's structure in early 2003 by introducing amendments to the Electricity Act. The Act reorganized NB Power into a holding company with four divisions: NB Power Distribution and Customer Service, NB Power Generation, NB Power Nuclear, and NB Power Transmission. The Act maintained the company's distribution, transmission, and nuclear power monopolies, but opened the door to competition in the generation business. The reorganization also created the New Brunswick Electric Finance Corporation, which was responsible for issuing, managing and paying NB Power's debt through payments dividends, fees and taxes paid by the various subsidiaries, and the New Brunswick System Operator, an independent market operator that administered relationships between power generators and users.

=== 2013 Reorganization ===
The NB Power Group of Companies, the Electric Finance Corporation, and the New Brunswick System Operator merged on October 1, 2013, re-establishing NB Power as a single, vertically integrated Crown corporation.

== Personnel ==
In October 2008, NB Power Holding Corporation was named one of "Canada's Top 100 Employers" by Mediacorp Canada Inc., and was featured in Maclean's newsmagazine. In 2009, NB Power became the first electric utility to be recognized by the National Quality Institute by being awarded a Healthy Workplace Award.

David D. Hay resigned as president in 2010, claiming he had never been consulted on the proposed sale of NB Power, the valuations or the strategies involved. He was replaced by Gaëtan Thomas, the former Vice President of NB Power's Nuclear Division, who remained the president and CEO of NB Power till May, 2020. Keith Cronkhite was appointed NB Power president and chief executive officer CEO on April 1, 2020.

Lori Clark was appointed president and chief executive officer (acting) on July 4, 2022.

== Operations ==
=== Power generation ===
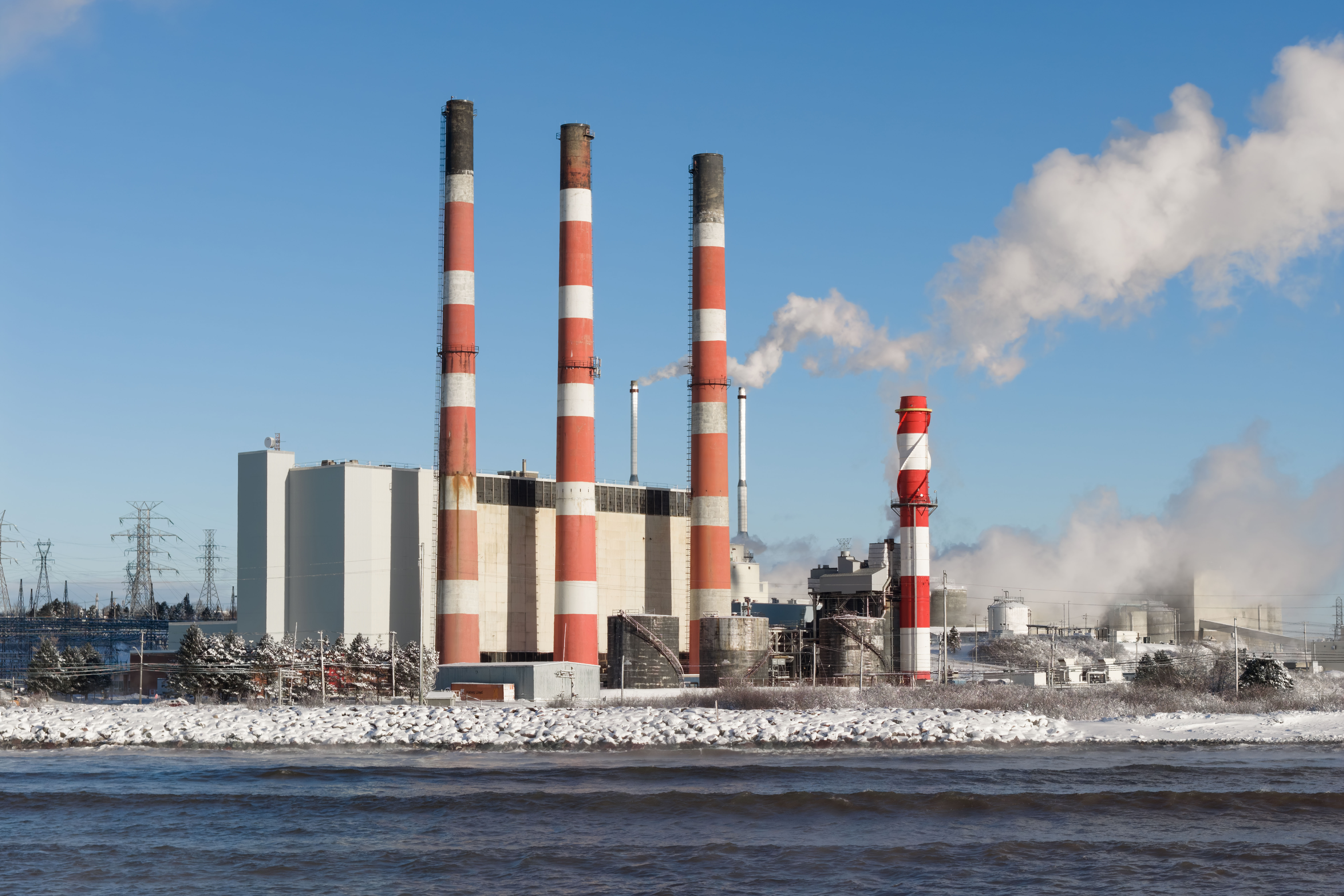
Bayside Generating Station in Saint John

NB Power operates 13 generating stations with a total installed capacity of 3,513 MW as of 2013. The generation fleet uses a variety of energy sources: heavy fuel oil (972 MW), hydro (889 MW), uranium (660 MW), diesel (525 MW), and coal (467 MW). As of 2020, NB Power's grid includes 355 MW of wind energy.

The generation facilities are spread across the province. However, the Saint John, New Brunswick area accounts for nearly half of the total NB Power-owned generation capacity, with the Coleson Cove (972 MW), the Point Lepreau Nuclear Generating Station (660 MW), and Bayside Generating Station (277 MW). Saint John is home to energy-intensive industries such as the Irving Oil Refinery, JD Irving pulp and paper mills, and the Canaport liquefied natural gas terminal.

==== Thermal generation ====
NB Power operates two thermal and three combustion turbine facilities with a combined generating capacity of 1,964 MW.

==== Nuclear generation ====
NB Power operates the Point Lepreau Nuclear Generating Station which is the only active nuclear generating station in Canada outside of Ontario. It has a generation capacity of 660 MW.

==== Hydroelectric generation ====
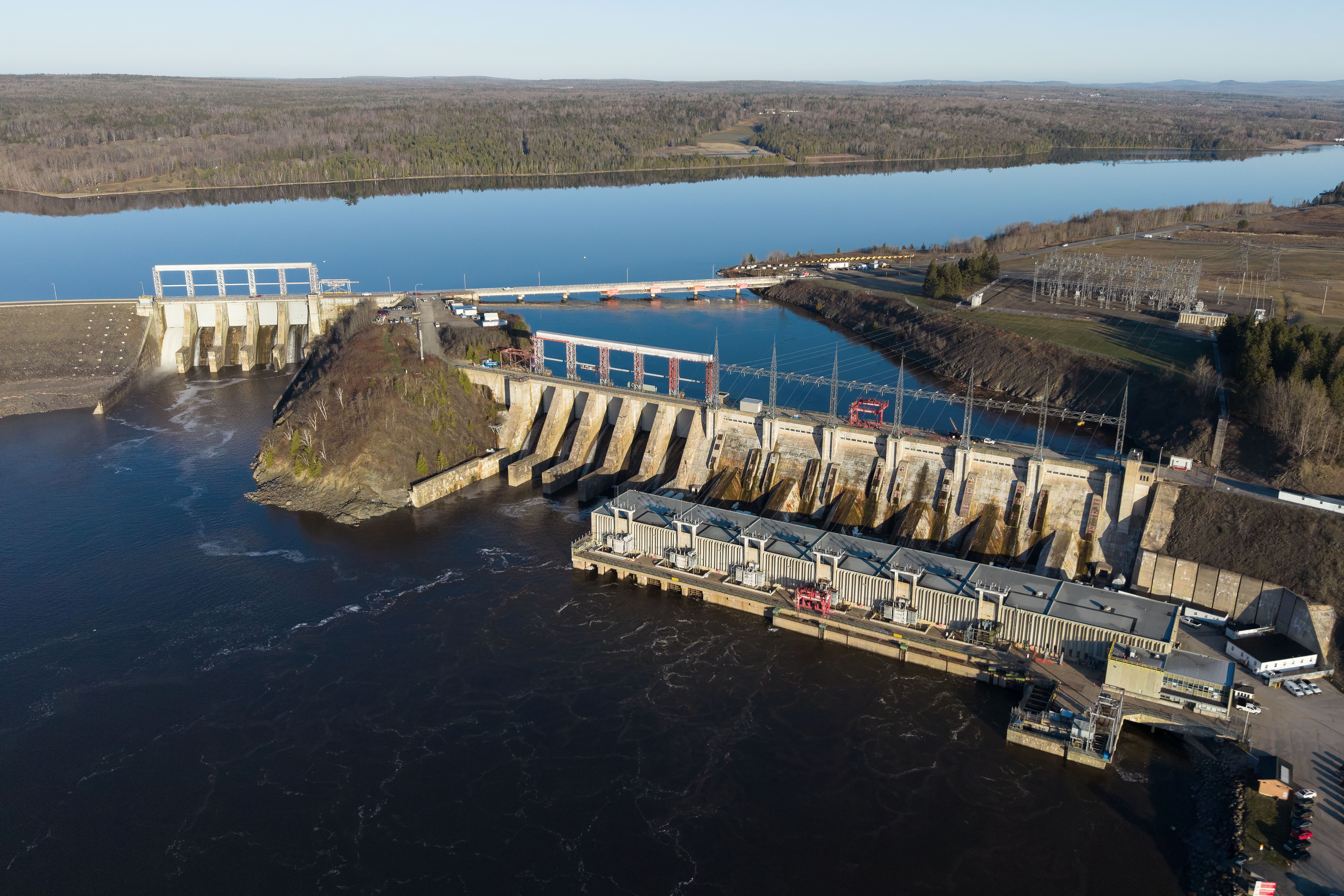
The Mactaquac dam and generating station on the Saint John River, upstream from Fredericton.

NB Power operates seven hydroelectric dams in the province with a combined generating capacity of 889 MW. The main hydroelectric facilities are located on the Saint John River.

The province's largest, the Mactaquac generating station (668 MW), stands some 20 miles (32 km) upstream of the capital city, Fredericton. It was built between 1965 and 1968 at a cost of C$128 million. The plant has been a concern for some time due to alkali-aggregate reaction, which is causing the dam to expand and crack. The problem has been known since the 1970s and could reduce the dam's life by half, according to a 2000 report by a panel of international engineering experts commissioned by the Crown corporation.

=== Electric transmission ===
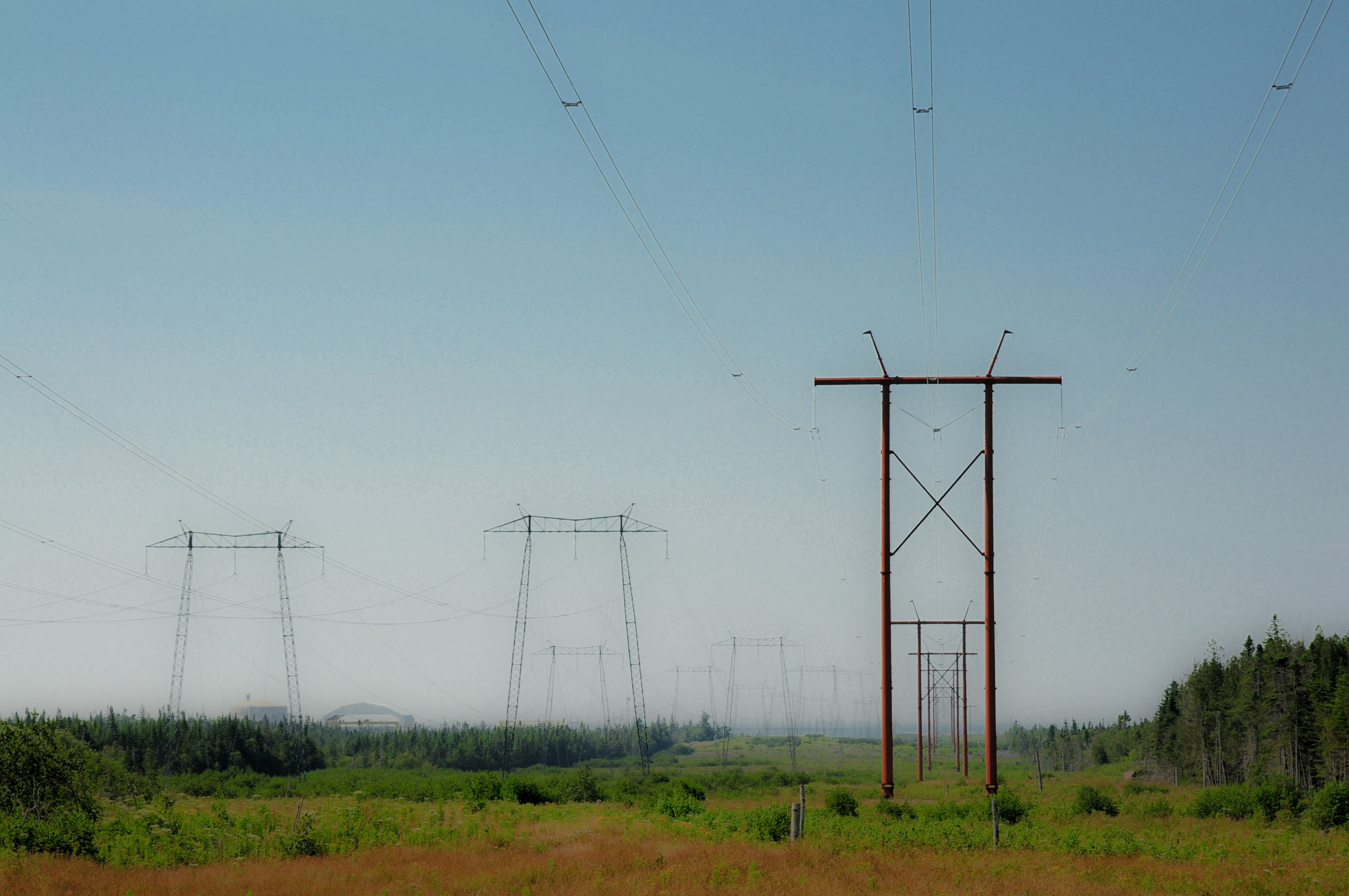
Transmission lines near the Point Lepreau Nuclear Generating Station, in southwestern New Brunswick.

NB Power's transmission grid includes over 6,849 kilometres (4,256 mi) of high voltage transmission lines ranging from 69 kV AC to 345 kV AC. The company operates interconnections with Hydro-Québec, Nova Scotia Power, Maritime Electric in Prince Edward Island and the ISO New England network in the United States. The network is operated by the Transmission & System Operator division of NB Power.

The main power grid forms an O-shaped loop with 345 kV lines. This power line runs through substations at Keswick, Saint-André, Eel River, Belledune, Bathurst, Salisbury, Valley Waters, Coleson Cove, Point Lepreau, and back to Keswick. There is also a direct connection of a parallel 345 kV line between Coleson Cove and Keswick.

NB Power supplies electricity to Maritime Electric in Prince Edward Island through a sub-sea interconnection cable on the floor of the Northumberland Strait, and imports/exports from/to Nova Scotia via Canada's first electrical interconnection between two provinces. NB Power also has interconnections to Maine.

Because of the asynchronous nature of Hydro-Québec's electricity transmission system, interconnections between the two neighboring provinces require HVDC converters. The first one, the Eel River Converter Station, was installed in 1972 and has a 350 MW transfer capacity. It is the first operative HVDC system equipped with thyristors The second converter, the Madawaska substation (435 MW), was built on the Quebec side of the border in 1985 and is operated by Hydro-Québec TransÉnergie. The two systems are linked by two 230-kV lines between Matapédia and Eel River, and by two 315-kV lines between the Madawaska and Edmundston substations. Some of NB Power loads in these areas can be islanded and supplied as part of the Quebec grid, which increases New Brunswick's import capability to 1,080 MW, whereas export capability to Quebec is limited to 785 MW.

=== Coal mining ===
Beginning in 1986, NB Power operated a coal mine in Minto through its NB Coal subsidiary. The company extracted approximately 150,000 tons of coal per year to fuel the Grand Lake Generating Station, a 57 MW power plant built in 1963. On September 30, 2009, the company announced the planned closure of the mine and the decommissioning of the Grand Lake Generating Station. The company management explained the decision by stressing the high cost of complying with stricter SO_{2} emission regulations. The decommissioning and demolition of the Grand Lake Generating Station were completed in 2012.

== Financial results ==
Financial Data 2017-1998 (year ending on 31 March) millions of Canadian dollars
	2017	2016	2015	2014	2013	2012	2011	2010	2009	2008	2007	2006	2005	2004	2003	2002	2001	2000	1999	1998
Revenue	1,696	1,791	1,791	1,797	1,605	1,646	1,616	1,635	1,453	1,712	1,512	1,585	1,403	1,311	1,273	1,319	1,309	1,248	1,204	1,140
Net earnings (Net losses)	27	12	100	55	65	173	67	(117)	70	89	21	96	9	(18)	(77)	20	(78)	17	(423)	(21)
Dividends declared					11	16	9	13	13	11	10	12	5	0	0	0	0	0	0	0
Total assets	5,959	5,895	6,128	6,863	6,689	6,006	5,632	5,379	5,190	4,686	4,151	3,969	3,874	3,729	3,387	3,236	3,298	3,464	3,666	4,197
Long term debt	4,007	4,124	4,025	4,597	4,692	3,469	3,417	3,481	3,051	2,891	2,869	2,655	2,459	3,217	2,999	2,530	2,950	2,795	3,019	3,104

== Investment concern ==
In 2019, the utility was criticized for having invested $13 million in Joi Scientific, a Florida-based company that promised to deliver hydrogen-based power from seawater with 200% efficiency. According to critics, their promised efficiency violated the first law of thermodynamics. During a call with investors during the summer of 2019, Joi Scientific announced that their technology was perhaps only ~10% as efficient as previously described, meaning that their process consumes energy rather than producing it. The company also announced that they were running low on funding. Joi Scientific's technology has been described by a former employee as being based on the work of discredited inventor Stanley Meyer.

== See also ==
- List of generating stations in New Brunswick
- Proposed sale of NB Power
