= Tropical Storm Nadine (2024) =

Atlantic tropical storm

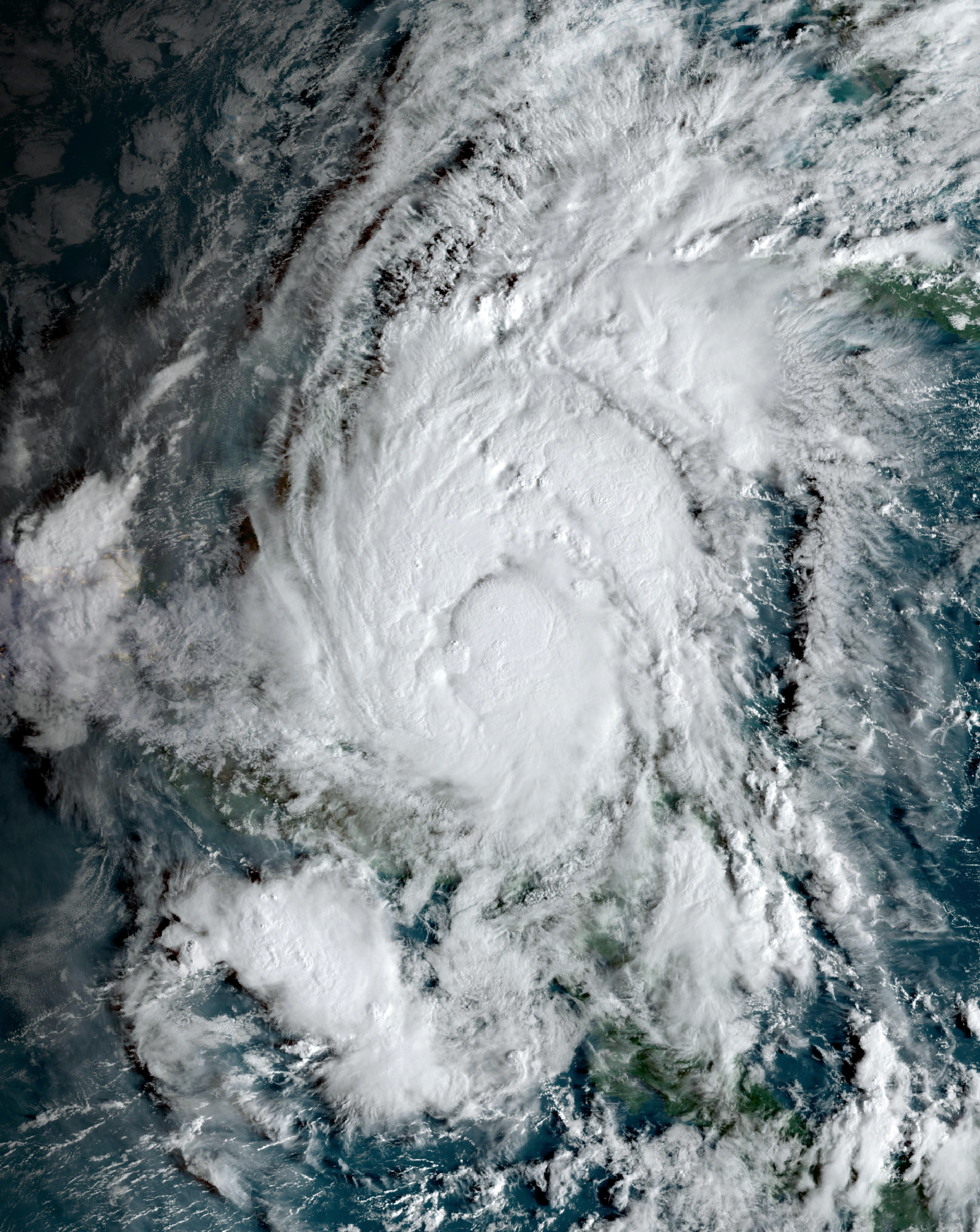
- Nadine off the coast of Belize on October 19

Meteorological history
- Formed: October 19, 2024
- Dissipated: October 20, 2024

Tropical storm
- 1-minute sustained (SSHWS/NWS)
- Highest winds: 60 mph (95 km/h)
- Lowest pressure: 1002 mbar (hPa); 29.59 inHg

Overall effects
- Fatalities: 13
- Missing: 1
- Damage: $255 million (2024 USD)
- Areas affected: Belize; Mexico (Yucatán Peninsula and Chiapas); Guatemala; Honduras
- Part of the 2024 Atlantic hurricane season

Tropical Storm Nadine was a short-lived tropical cyclone that made landfall in Belize in October 2024. The fourteenth named storm of the 2024 Atlantic hurricane season, Nadine originated from a low-pressure area over the western Caribbean Sea, and underwent tropical cyclogenesis on October 15. After increased signs of organization, the system was named Nadine by the National Hurricane Center on October 19. Nadine gradually strengthened as it neared the coast, making landfall near Belize City with 60 mph (95 km/h) winds. After moving across Belize and Guatemala, it then weakened to a tropical depression before degenerating to a remnant low over southeastern Mexico. Its remnants later contributed to the formation of Hurricane Kristy in the eastern Pacific.

Nadine produced rainfall totals of up to 51 mm (2.0 in) in Belize. In Quintana Roo, about 90 mm (3.5 in) of rain was recorded. There, Mex$11 million (US$546,000) was spent to repair the damage caused by the storm. In Chiapas, the storm damaged more than 1,200 homes. There were four deaths in Chiapas as a result of the storm. Damage in Chiapas reached approximately Mex$2 billion (US$101 million). There were also nine fatalities in Veracruz. There, damage totaled to Mex$2.82 billion (US$153 million).

== Meteorological history ==
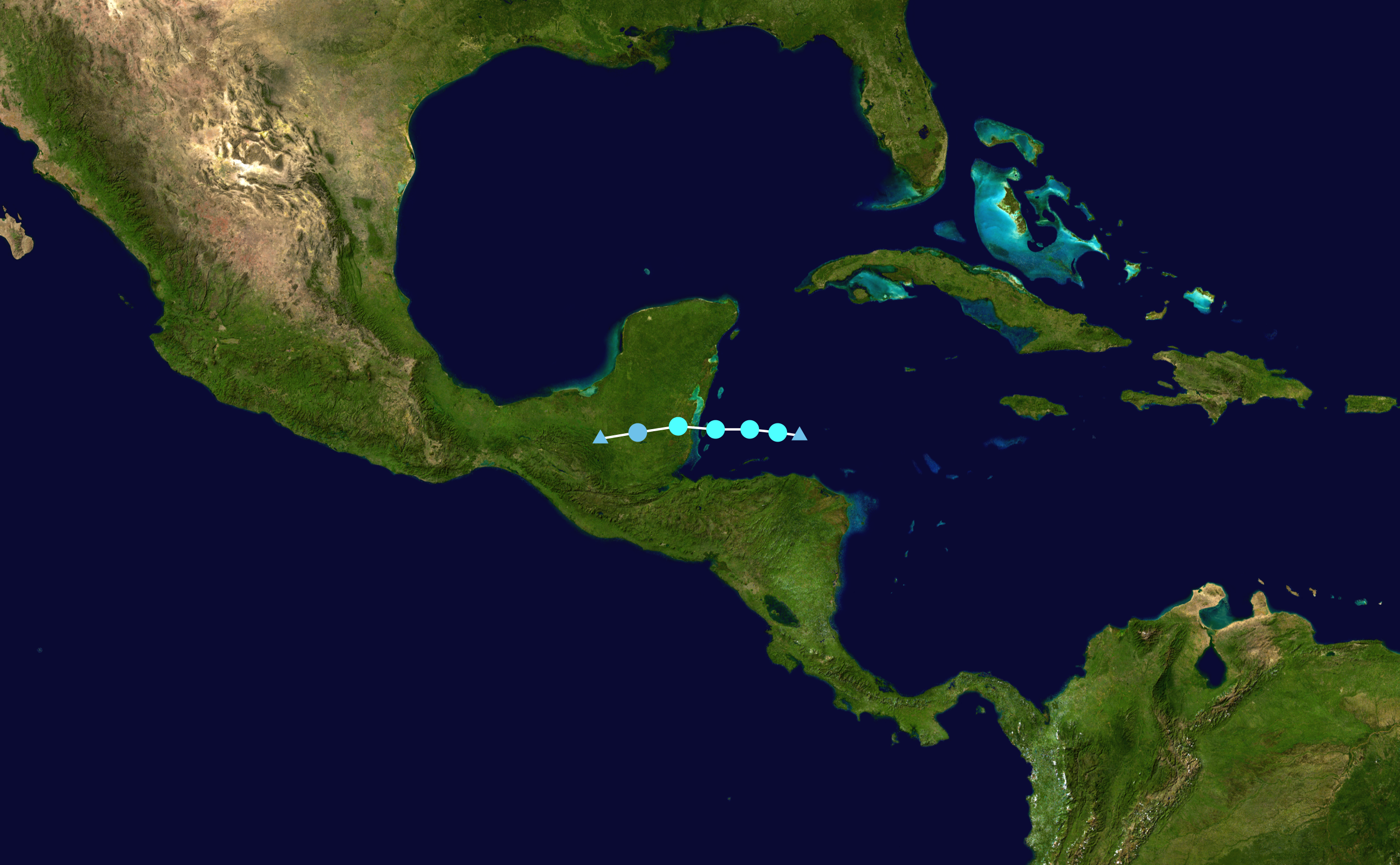
Map plotting the storm's track and intensity, according to the Saffir–Simpson scale Map key Saffir–Simpson scale Tropical depression (≤38 mph, ≤62 km/h) Tropical storm (39–73 mph, 63–118 km/h) Category 1 (74–95 mph, 119–153 km/h) Category 2 (96–110 mph, 154–177 km/h) Category 3 (111–129 mph, 178–208 km/h) Category 4 (130–156 mph, 209–251 km/h) Category 5 (≥157 mph, ≥252 km/h) Unknown Storm type Tropical cyclone Subtropical cyclone Extratropical cyclone, remnant low, tropical disturbance, or monsoon depression

Nadine originated from a broad area of low pressure that formed over the southwestern Caribbean Sea on October 15. The system produced disorganized showers and thunderstorms over the next couple of days as it moved slowly northwestward, passing offshore of the east coast of Nicaragua. Shower and thunderstorm activity increased later on October 17, and surface observations showed falling surface pressures over the western Caribbean Sea that day. The next day, showers and thunderstorms began showing increased signs of organization. Consequently, the system was designated Potential Tropical Cyclone Fifteen on that afternoon. Tropical Storm Nadine formed by 00:00 UTC on October 19, about 185 mi (295 km) east of Belize City, Belize.

As Nadine moved westward, Nadine's convection was displaced to the north and east of the storm. However, Nadine became better organized and intensified later that day over the very warm waters of the northwestern Caribbean Sea in a favorable environment. Convection began to wrap around the center of the storm and the storm contracted as Nadine developed rainbands and approached the coast of Belize. Nadine made landfall at peak intensity as a 60 mph (95 km/h) strong tropical storm with a minimum pressure of 1,002 mbar (29.6 inHg) near Belize City at 16:00 UTC on October 19.

After landfall, Nadine moved westward across northern portions of Belize and Guatemala, weakening to a tropical depression by 00:00 UTC on October 20, located about 30 mi (45 km) north-northwest of Flores, Guatemala. Land interaction induced further weakening as convection diminished and the circulation became less defined. As a result, Nadine degenerated to a remnant low and dissipated over southern Mexico. However, remnant moisture from Nadine moved into the eastern Pacific basin and contributed to the formation of Hurricane Kristy on October 21.

== Preparations and impact ==
=== Belize ===
Wettest tropical cyclones and their remnants in Belize Highest-known totals
Precipitation			Storm	Location	Ref.
Rank	mm	in	Storm	Location	Ref.
1	829.8	32.67	Keith 2000	Philip Goldson Airport	
2	555.2	21.86	Eta 2020	Baldy Beacon	
3	546.6	21.52	Sixteen 2008	Baldy Beacon	
4	299.7	11.80	Amanda 2020	Belmopan	
5	249.2	9.81	Chantal 2001	Towerhill	
6	246.0	9.69	Mitch 1998	Central Farm Meteorological Station	
7	241.0	9.49	Gert 1993	Hunting Caye	
8	240.6	9.47	Nadine 2024	Ranchito	
9	179.0	7.05	Greta 1978	Central Farm Meteorological Station	
10	152.4	6.00	Fifi 1974	La Placencia	

On the afternoon of October 18, tropical storm watches were issued from Belize City to the Belize–Mexico border and were upgraded to a tropical storm warning the next day. Shelters were opened in Cayo District, Belize District, and in San Pedro Town.

After making landfall near Belize City, Nadine produced rainfall totals of up to 241 mm (9.5 in) in some areas. The heavy rainfall caused the Mollejon Dam and Vaca Reservoir to spill, with the Chalillo Dam nearly spilling after it held back the rain-swollen Macal River. A bridge connecting the villages of San Ignacio and Santa Elena over the river was destroyed as a result of it cresting over 4.6 metres (15 ft) above normal levels. Several other nearby bridges were not passable for the same reasons; the Mopan River saw its water levels rise as well. In Corozal District, the Hondo River flooded several areas after its water levels also rose, in which a flood warning was in effect for multiple towns along it. Water levels of the river were not seen in some areas since Hurricane Keith, a Category 4 hurricane in 2000. Additionally, several roads in the district impassable due to flooding.

=== Mexico ===
On the afternoon of October 18, tropical storm watches were issued from the Mexico–Belize border to Tulum, Quintana Roo, and was upgraded to a tropical storm warning the next day.

A total of 13 deaths and US$255 million worths of damage was reported in Mexico. In Quintana Roo, Nadine and an approaching cold front caused rainfall reaching 260.8 mm (10.27 in) in Nicolas Bravo. Several houses were flooded in Chetumal. A section of the Morocoy–San Pedro highway was badly damaged. The government of Quintana Roo allocated MX$11 million (US$553,000) to repair the damage caused by the storm. Floods, power outages and uprooted trees were reported in Campeche, with strong waves stranding about 300 coastal vessels. Heavy rain and an overflown stream caused flooding and landslides that damaged 15 houses in Tacotalpa, Tabasco. In Tepito, a home was damaged due to a falling tree, with minor injuries reported.

In Chiapas, floods damaged 14 houses in Rayón, and two more in Rincón Chamula San Pedro. A landslide blocked a section of Federal Highway 190. Overflowing streams led to damage to another 21 homes and three vehicles. Parts of dirt roads collapsed in Ostuacán. Twenty municipalities experienced significant damage, with 1,290 homes being damaged by floodwaters. A maximum of 336.8 millimetres (13.26 in) of rain were reported El Escalón, submerging streets. In Cintalpa, seven homes collapsed. Four deaths were reported in Chiapas as a result of the storm. Two people died inside a house in the municipality of Tila that was hit during a landslide; and in San Juan Chamula, a man drowned when his vehicle was swept away by flood waters. Damage across the state from Nadine and the stalled cold front reached MX$2 billion (US$101 million).

In Veracruz, flooding associated with Nadine and the approaching cold front caused sinkholes, landslides, and overflowing streams in Coatzacoalcos, Cosoleacaque, and Minatitlán. 484.5 mm (19.07 in) of rain fell in Ángel Rosario Cabada. The town of Zongolica was hit with major flooding. In Misantla, minor damage was reported, while classes were suspended due to the storm's presence. 3,486 homes were affected by flooding with damage totaling to MX$2.82 billion (US$153 million) statewide. There were nine fatalities, including one after his house was overtaken by a mudslide in the Sierra de Zongolica, and another in Santiago Tuxtla as a result of an electrocution; a man also went missing after being swept away by flooding.

In Oaxaca, heavy rainfall led to flooding and landslides. A landslide led to the complete closure of Federal Highway 175 between the cities of Oaxaca and Tuxtepec. Severe flooding occurred in the Isthmus of Tehuantepec region, where streets and avenues were covered in water. However, only minor damage were reported throughout the state.

=== Elsewhere ===
In Guatemala, several rivers flooded in the Petén Department. Many vehicles were suspended on roads due to fast-flowing floodwaters. A peak rainfall of 121.9 mm (4.80 in) was reported in Esquipulas and 98.7 mm (3.89 in) in Poptún. Other areas of the country, including Amatitlán, also suffered from heavy rainfall. Nadine also caused rainfall in parts of northern Honduras.

== See also ==
- Other storms of the same name
- Weather of 2024
- Tropical cyclones in 2024
- Timeline of the 2024 Atlantic hurricane season
- Hurricanes in Belize
- Tropical Storm Sara (2024) – made landfall in Belize later in the year.
