= Investor-owned utilities in the United States =

Supplier of basic services

Investor-owned utilities (IOUs) are private enterprises acting as public utilities.

Investor-owned electric power delivery utilities with assets in the United States of America
| Parent company | Operating company | Operating states |
|---|---|---|
| AES Corporation (AES) | AES Indiana, formerly Indianapolis Power & Light | IN |
| AES Corporation (AES) | Dayton Power and Light | OH |
| Algonquin Power & Utilities | Liberty Utilities | AZ, AR, CA, GA, IN, IA, KS, MA, MO, NH, NY, OK, TX |
| Allete (ALE) | Minnesota Power | MN |
| Allete (ALE) | Superior Water, Light and Power | WI |
| Alliant Energy (LNT) | Interstate Power and Light | IA |
| Alliant Energy (LNT) | Wisconsin Power and Light | WI |
| Ameren (AEE) | Ameren Illinois | IL |
| Ameren (AEE) | Ameren Missouri | MO |
| American Electric Power (AEP) | AEP Ohio | OH, WV |
| American Electric Power (AEP) | AEP Texas | TX |
| American Electric Power (AEP) | Appalachian Power | TN, VA, WV |
| American Electric Power (AEP) | Indiana Michigan Power | IN, MI |
| American Electric Power (AEP) | Kentucky Power | KY |
| American Electric Power (AEP) | Public Service Company of Oklahoma | OK |
| American Electric Power (AEP) | Southwestern Electric Power | TX |
| American Transmission Company | American Transmission Company | WI, MI |
| Avangrid | Rochester Gas & Electric | NY |
| Avangrid | New York State Electric & Gas | NY |
| Avangrid | Central Maine Power | ME |
| Avangrid | The United Illuminating Company | CT |
| Avista Corporation (AVA) | Avista Utilities | ID, WA |
| Black Hills Corporation (BKH) | Black Hills Energy | CO, SD, IA, KS, NE, WY, MT, AR |
| CenterPoint Energy (CNP) | CenterPoint Energy | TX |
| Fortis Inc. (FTS) | Central Hudson Gas & Electric | NY |
| Cleco Holdings | Cleco | LA |
| Consolidated Edison (ED) | Consolidated Edison | NY |
| Consolidated Edison (ED) | Orange and Rockland Utilities | NY, NJ, PA |
| CMS Energy (CMS) | Consumers Energy | MI |
| Dominion Energy | Dominion Virginia Power | VA |
| Dominion Energy | Dominion North Carolina Power | NC |
| DQE | Duquesne Light | PA |
| DTE Energy Electric Company (DTE) | Detroit Edison | MI |
| Duke Energy (DUK) | Duke Energy Carolinas | NC, SC |
| Duke Energy (DUK) | Duke Energy Progress | NC, SC |
| Duke Energy (DUK) | Duke Energy Indiana | IN |
| Duke Energy (DUK) | Duke Energy Ohio | OH |
| Duke Energy (DUK) | Duke Energy Kentucky | KY |
| Duke Energy (DUK) | Duke Energy Florida | FL |
| Edison International (EIX) | Southern California Edison | CA |
| Énergir | Central Vermont Public Service | VT |
| Énergir | Green Mountain Power | VT |
| ENMAX | Versant Power | ME |
| Entergy (ETR) | Entergy Arkansas | AR |
| Entergy (ETR) | Entergy Louisiana | LA |
| Entergy (ETR) | Entergy Gulf States | LA |
| Entergy (ETR) | Entergy Mississippi | MS |
| Entergy (ETR) | Entergy New Orleans | LA |
| Entergy (ETR) | Entergy Texas | TX |
| Evergy (EVRG) | Evergy | MO, KS |
| Eversource Energy (ES) | Connecticut Light & Power | CT |
| Eversource Energy (ES) | NSTAR Electric | MA |
| Eversource Energy (ES) | Public Service New Hampshire | NH |
| Eversource Energy (ES) | Western Massachusetts Electric | MA |
| Exelon (EXC) | Commonwealth Edison | IL |
| Exelon (EXC) | Philadelphia Electric | PA |
| Exelon (EXC) | Baltimore Gas & Electric | MD |
| Exelon (EXC) | Potomac Electric Power | DC, MD |
| Exelon (EXC) | Delmarva Power | DE, MD |
| Exelon (EXC) | Atlantic City Electric | NJ |
| FirstEnergy (FE) | Ohio Edison | OH |
| FirstEnergy (FE) | Cleveland Electric Illuminating | OH |
| FirstEnergy (FE) | Toledo Edison | OH |
| FirstEnergy (FE) | Pennsylvania Power | PA |
| FirstEnergy (FE) | Penelec | PA |
| FirstEnergy (FE) | Met-Ed | PA |
| FirstEnergy (FE) | Jersey Central P&L | NJ |
| FirstEnergy (FE) | Allegheny Energy | PA |
| FirstEnergy (FE) | Monongahela Power | WV |
| FirstEnergy (FE) | Potomac Edison | MD, WV, VA |
| FirstEnergy (FE) | West Penn | PA |
| Hawaiian Electric Industries (HE) | Hawaii Electric Company | HI |
| Hawaiian Electric Industries (HE) | Hawaii Electric Light Company | HI |
| Hawaiian Electric Industries (HE) | Maui Electric Company | HI |
| Integrys Energy Group | Wisconsin Public Service Corporation | WI |
| Integrys Energy Group | Upper Peninsula Power Company | MI |
| ITC Holdings | ITC Transmission | MI |
| ITC Holdings | Michigan Electric Transmission Company | MI |
| ITC Holdings | ITC Midwest | IA, MN, IL, MO |
| ITC Holdings | ITC Great Plains | OK, KS |
| MDU Resources (MDU) | Montana-Dakota Utilities | MT, ND, SD, WY |
| MGE Energy (MGEE) | Madison Gas and Electric | WI |
| Berkshire Hathaway Energy | MidAmerican Energy Company | IA, IL, SD, NE |
| Berkshire Hathaway Energy | Pacificorp--Pacific Power | OR, CA, WA |
| Berkshire Hathaway Energy | Pacificorp--Rocky Mountain Power | UT, WY, ID |
| Berkshire Hathaway Energy | NV Energy | NV, CA |
| National Grid plc (NGG) | New England Power | MA, NH, VT, CT, ME |
| National Grid plc (NGG) | Massachusetts Electric | MA |
| National Grid plc (NGG) | Nantucket Electric | MA |
| National Grid plc (NGG) | Granite State Electric | NH |
| National Grid plc (NGG) | Niagara Mohawk Power | NY |
| National Grid plc (NGG) | Long Island Lighting | NY |
| NextEra Energy (NEE) | Florida Power & Light | FL |
| NextEra Energy (NEE) | Gulf Power | FL |
| NiSource (NI) | Northern Indiana Public Service Company | IN |
| NorthWestern Corporation (NWE) | NorthWestern Energy | SD, MT, NE |
| NRG Energy (NRG) | Reliant Energy | TX |
| NV Energy | Berkshire Hathaway Inc. | NV |
| OGE Energy Corporation (OGE) | Oklahoma Gas & Electric | OK, AR |
| Otter Tail Corporation (OTTR) | Otter Tail Power | ND, MN, SD |
| PG&E Corporation (PCG) | Pacific Gas & Electric Company | CA |
| Pinnacle West Capital (PNW) | Arizona Public Service | AZ |
| PNM Resources (PNM) | Public Service Company of New Mexico | NM |
| PNM Resources (PNM) | Texas-New Mexico Power | TX |
| Portland General Electric (POR) | Portland General Electric | OR |
| PPL Corporation (PPL) | PPL Electric Utilities | PA |
| PPL Corporation (PPL) | Louisville Gas & Electric | KY |
| PPL Corporation (PPL) | Kentucky Utilities | KY |
| PPL Corporation (PPL) | Rhode Island Energy | RI |
| Public Service Enterprise Group (PEG) | Public Service Electric & Gas | NJ |
| Puget Energy | Puget Sound Energy | WA |
| SCANA (SCG) | South Carolina Electric & Gas Company | SC |
| Sempra Energy (SRE) | San Diego Gas & Electric | CA |
| Southern Company (SO) | Alabama Power | AL |
| Southern Company (SO) | Georgia Power | GA |
| Southern Company (SO) | Mississippi Power | MS |
| TECO Energy | Tampa Electric | FL |
| UGI Corporation (UGI) | United Electric Company | PA |
| UniSource Energy | Tucson Electric Power | AZ |
| UniSource Energy | UNS Electric | AZ |
| Unitil (UTL) | Unitil Energy | MA, NH |
| Unitil (UTL) | Fitchburg Gas & Electric | MA |
| Vectren (VVC) | Southern Indiana Gas and Electric | IN |
| Wisconsin Energy Corporation | We Energies | WI |
| Xcel Energy (XEL) | Northern States Power Company | MN, ND, SD, WI |
| Xcel Energy (XEL) | Public Service Colorado | CO |
| Xcel Energy (XEL) | Southwestern Public Service | NM, TX |
