= Arizona House Bill 2005 =

Arizona law enacted in 2018

Public service corporations; penalties

Arizona State Legislature
- Long title: AMENDING TITLE 9, CHAPTER 4, ARTICLE 1, ARIZONA REVISED STATUTES, BY ADDING SECTION 9-403.01; RELATING TO THE SALE OR LEASE OF MUNICIPAL PROPERTY.
- Passed by: Arizona State Legislature
- Passed: 22 March 2018
- Enacted: 23 March 2018

Legislative history
- Bill title: HB 2005
- Bill citation: AZ HB2005

Summary
- Bill signed into law by Arizona Governor Doug Ducey on March 23, 2018

Arizona House Bill 2005 is state-level legislation introduced in the Arizona State Legislature and signed into law in 2018.

== Arizona Renewable Energy Standards Initiative ==
Proposition 127 results by county No: 80–90%; 70–80%; 60–70%; 50–60%

The legislation is connected to Proposition 127, a ballot initiative in Arizona. The ballot initiative, called the Arizona Renewable Energy Standards Initiative (or "Clean Energy for Healthy Arizona"), will likely appear on the Arizona general election ballot on November 6, 2018 as an initiated constitutional amendment.

If passed, the initiative would require that electric utilities operating in Arizona acquire their electricity from a certain percentage of renewable resources per year. Examples of acceptable renewable resources include solar, wind, biomass, hydropower, geothermal, and landfill gas energies.

Supporters of the ballot initiative have until July 5, 2018 to get at least 225,953 valid signatures on petitions to put the issue on the November ballot.

The ballot initiative amends the Constitution of Arizona. It does this to prevent lawmakers from changing it after it is passed; in order to change it, Arizonans would have to take the issue back to voters.

Under the ballot initiative, by 2020 Arizona electric utilities would have to use renewable resources for at least 12% of their electricity. That threshold would go up to 50% by the year 2030.

== House Bill 2005 ==
The legislation would fine electric utilities that violate the initiatives renewable energy standards. Fines would be between $100 and $5000. The authors of the bill wrote the legislation in such a way that "any public service corporation that violates or fails to comply with the constitution . . . is subject to a penalty of not less than one hundred nor more than five thousand dollars for each offense."

The Arizona State Senate passed the bill by a vote of 16 to 12 on March 21, 2018. The following day, the Arizona House of Representatives passed the bill by a vote of 34 to 24. On March 23, Gov. Doug Ducey signed the bill.

As the Arizona Capitol Times put it, the legislation is a way to "give utilities a way to avoid having to get half their electricity from renewable sources by 2030 even if voters mandate that they do so" [by passing the ballot initiative].

The Arizona Constitution gives authority to the Arizona Corporation Commission to set utility rates. Courts have decided that the commission is also allowed to decide what mix of energy sources utilities are required to use.

== Support and opposition ==
The Sierra Club, which is opposed to the bill, argues that the bill merely makes violation of the ballot initiative have too low of a penalty. A lobbyist for the Sierra Club said, "Everyone knows that if the cost of noncompliance is cheaper than the cost of compliance, entities will serve their shareholders, not consumers, and take the low road and pay the fines."

In support of the bill are electric utilities who are opposed to how the initiative is being rolled out; it is being sponsored financially by a California billionaire. Utilities argue that the bill would protect the state's energy prices. Rod Ross, a lobbyist for the state's largest electric utility Arizona Public Service, said, "We feel like its important to protect the people of this state from an out-of-state initiative funded by a California billionaire that is attempting to raise our state's and our residents' energy prices, which is exactly what this initiative will do."

State Senator Juan Mendez (D-Tempe) asked Ross if it was the intent of the utility industry to ignore the mandate if it is enacted by voters, and simply pay the fine instead. Ross said that if utilities were mandated to increase their renewable energy, they would consult with Arizona lawmakers, regulators, and others to come to the best decision.

Other supporters include Tucson Electric Power, UNS Energy, and other electric cooperatives.

Laurie Roberts, an opinion columnist for The Arizona Republic, wrote on March 26, 2018, "Arizona’s leaders have shown once again that they have absolutely no faith in Arizona’s voters. ... The bill [HB 2005] would essentially nullify a vote of the people this fall, should the people decide to mandate that require more use of solar and other types of renewable energy in Arizona."

However, according to the Arizona Capitol Times, Arizona Republican legislators clarified that the intent of HB 2005 was to ensure that it would not matter if voters side with the initiative organizers. State Rep. Vince Leach (R-Tucson) said it is the responsibility of the legislature to protect Arizona residents from out-of-state interests.
