= Cedar Island (Niagara River) =

Coordinates: 43.077142°N 79.0775°W

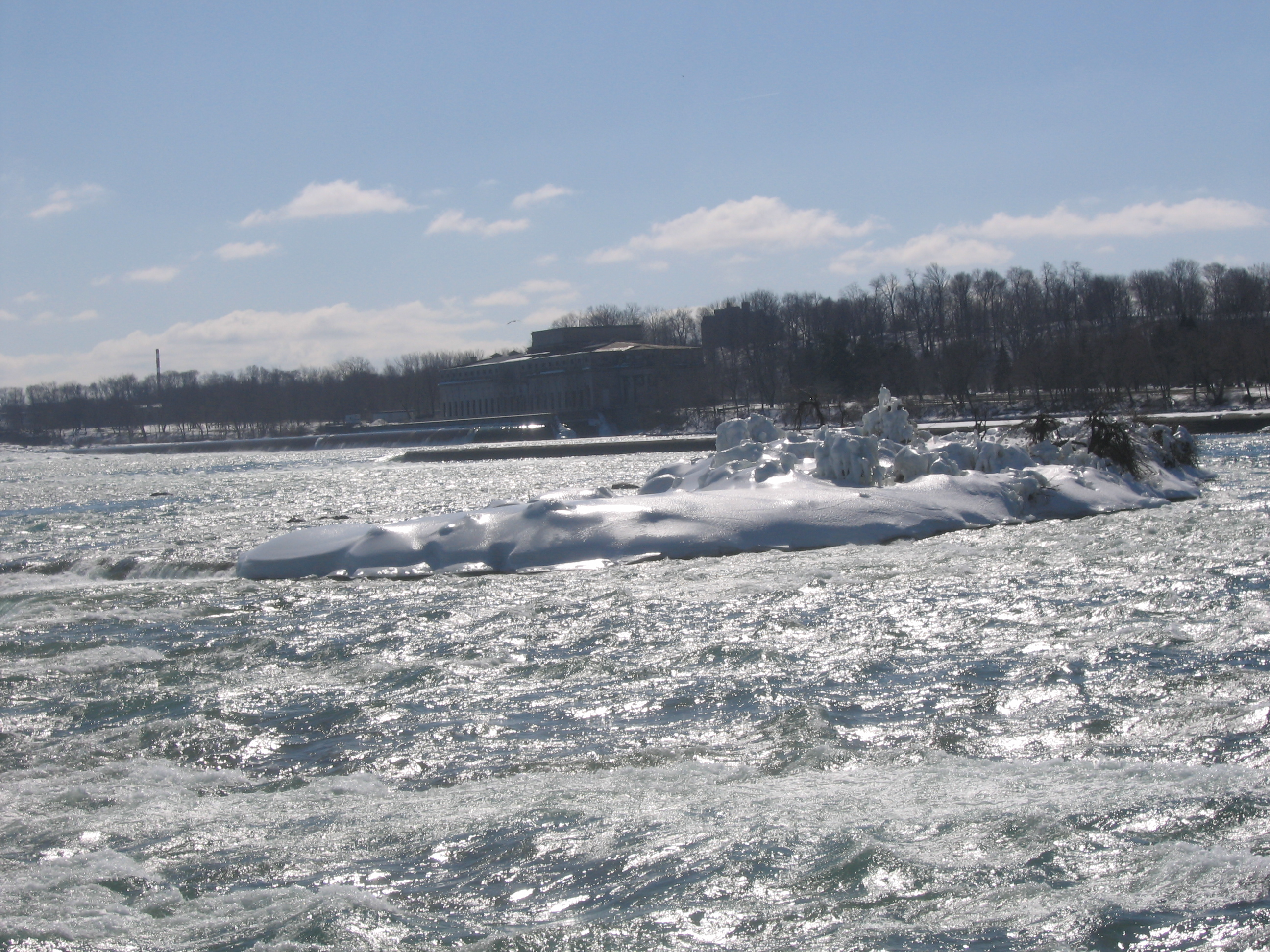
Cedar Island from ground level

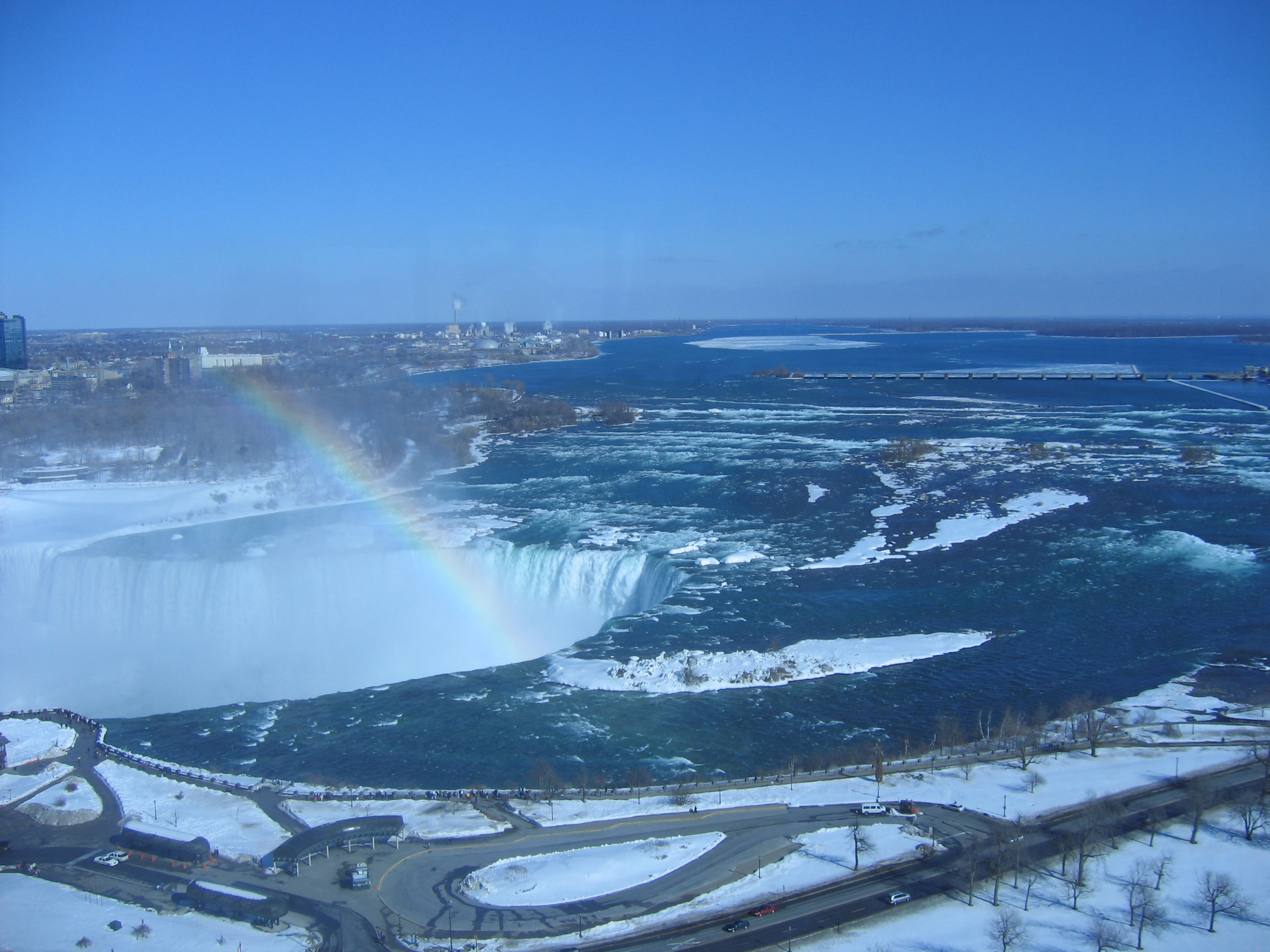
Aerial view of Cedar Island. The island's north end is located just in front of the drop, at the end of the rainbow.

Cedar Island was a small, uninhabited and elongated island located in the Niagara River near the Canadian shore, opposite the Table Rock observation area at the brink of the Horseshoe Falls.

== History ==
The island was occupied by Isaac Swayze in 1804. Swayze could not build anything but his wooden house leading to the island being undeveloped. By 1857, strong currents caused erosion which reduced the island to two acres. In 1857, Samuel Street obtained the lease for Cedar Island. He built a fifty-foot wooden observation tower on top of a house.

In 1905, the Canadian Niagara Power Company built a hydroelectric generating plant on Cedar Island. The power station became the William Birch Power Station. Due to the power plant, Cedar Island became nonexistent as a result of the land filling. The remnants of Cedar Island are located where the Power station is.
