= Niagara Mohawk Power Corporation =

Electric utility company in New York State, U.S.

Niagara Mohawk Holdings Inc.
- Founded: 1929; 97 years ago
- Defunct: 2000; 26 years ago (acquired by National Grid plc)
- Headquarters: Syracuse, New York, United States

Niagara Mohawk Power Corporation was a New York State utility company that was acquired in 2000 by National Grid plc. The Niagara Mohawk Power Corporation designation was subsequently retired, using variations of NationalGridUS (such as National Grid Buffalo), though its official designation on annual reports is still Niagara Mohawk Power Corporation.

== History ==
In 1929, 59 former companies were incorporated into the Niagara Hudson Power Corporation. In 1932 an Art Deco-style headquarters building was constructed in Syracuse. It was the main electric and natural gas provider for a large swath of northeastern, central and western New York, including the Capital District, Syracuse, Buffalo and Niagara Falls.

The statue on the front of the building is named "Spirit of Light" and was nicknamed "Iron Mike".

The company adopted the name Niagara Mohawk Power Corporation in 1950 after antitrust action required Niagara Hudson to forfeit some of their territory in the eastern part of the state. From 1950 to 2002 it owned the Rankine Generating Station in Niagara Falls, Ontario through its subsidiary Canadian Niagara Power. The station and Canadian Niagara Power were sold to Fortis Inc. in 2002.

The Nine Mile Point Nuclear Generating Station was erected by Niagara Mohawk. The first unit was completed in 1969, and was followed by a second unit in 1988. The plant was sold to Constellation Energy in 2001; Constellation's successor, Exelon, along with Électricité de France, co-own the plant today.

== See also ==
- KeySpan
