= Actuncan =

Maya site in western Belize

Actuncan was an ancient Mayan urban center located in the Mopan River valley in western Belize near the present-day Guatemalan border. The site sits on a ridge on the western banks of Mopan River, a tributary river to the Belize River. The site was first settled in the Middle Preclassic period around 1000 BC. During its approximate 2000 year occupation history, Actuncan, along with surrounding Mayan sites, experienced a large change in political power during the Terminal Classic period. This change in power led the urban centers to restructure their own political institutions, as well as their spiritual relationship and ritual practices, or face having their centers collapse. While many centers did fail, Actuncan was successful in its ability to effectively restructure their way of life by changing their practices and physically changing their surroundings to address those changes.

Although minor explorations occurred at Actuncan in the early 20th century, James McGovern conducted the first systematic excavations in the early 1990s. McGovern mapped the 14-hectare site and determined that Actuncan was divided into two distinct parts: Actuncan North and Actuncan South. Actuncan North appears to have been the main residential and everyday living area, while Actuncan South was a spiritual center that contained a temple complex. Since 2001, the Actuncan Archaeological Project has completed several excavation missions and projects to identify social, political, and environmental changes through time at the site and in the region.

== History ==
The earliest evidence of occupation at Actuncan comes from the Terminal Early Preclassic, but it appears that Actuncan was first settled in the Middle Preclassic period. Before becoming a kingship and a low-density urban center, the site was a Late Preclassic village.

=== Kingship ===
The original Late Preclassic village was buried when the site came under the rule of divine leadership in order to construct the monumental architecture studied today. This large project reflects the first shift of political power at Actuncan, as it likely required the authority to convince and persuade residents to allow it, and bring in workers from surrounding areas in the river valley to build the monumental structures, since Actuncan appeared to have a relatively low number of residents. This massive construction project allowed the rulers to structure the site's urban plan in a way that emphasized Mayan spiritual, cosmological practices in order to strengthen the legitimacy of their divine rule.

=== Royal polity ===
During the Early Classic and Late Classic periods, Actuncan fell under the control of two nearby sites—Buenavista del Cayo and then to Xunantunich. During its time as a polity of these two centers, there is little evidence of any major construction projects, though there is evidence to suggest that residents still inhabited Actuncan's households. Though now a secondary center, it was still under the rule of divine, royal leadership.

=== End of divine rule ===
In the early part of the Terminal Classic period, the divine leadership at Xunantunich began to weaken as its polities began to break ritual practices and declare independence. At the same time, many people in the river valley began to move away, meaning less labor was available for Xunantunich to maintain its control and infrastructure. This led to the eventual abandonment of Xunantunich. While many sites collapsed as residents chose to leave, due to the long time residents of Actuncan and the strong community ties, many residents at Actuncan chose to stay and establish their own local government. The new political power at Actuncan consisted of long-established households acting as a council and shifted away from divine rule. During this time civic construction and a change in ritual activity at Actuncan took place to reflect this change in sociopolitical structure.

== Site layout ==
Actuncan can be split into two separate areas: Actuncan North and Actuncan South. These areas both sit on adjacent hills that are divided by a ravine and connected by a single road, or sacbe. During the Late to Terminal Preclassic periods, the main configuration of Actuncan was established with modifications occurring afterwards. Its main configuration was likely determined to strengthen the political and social connection to the spiritual aspect of divine rule, while the modifications afterwards reflect a move away from divine leadership to a separation between political and spiritual power.

=== Actuncan North ===
Actuncan North is much larger than Actuncan South. It served as the main residential, social, economic, and political center. Actuncan North is where everyday life and activities occurred. This site consisted of five plazas surrounded by many monumental buildings sitting on top of raised platforms serving as houses, a palace, a ball court, and an E-Group, as well as interstitial spaces between these buildings that were likely used for a variety of activities. An E-Group is a common Mayan monumental structure that likely served as an early ritual location before the development of larger, more elaborate triadic temples. At Actuncan, this structure likely went on to function as an administrative building and a community gathering place. While most structures within Actuncan North relate to residential and administrative functions, during its time under divine rule, some of the structures acted as spaces for rulers to hold meetings and support their political power and their bureaucracy.

=== Actuncan South ===
Actuncan South acted as the main spiritual and ritual section of Actuncan. It consists of a single plaza containing a triadic pyramidal shrine complex. This triadic temple contains the site's tallest structure—a 27m tall pyramid. This triadic temple complexes likely served as a place for the community to gather for the ritual display led by the divine leaders meant to tie their authority to cosmology and the supernatural. The facade of some of the structures within Actuncan South were adorned with decorative masks made of stucco. These masks usually relate to Mayan creation and rebirth myths, further highlighting the divine rulers' relation and power obtained from cosmological forces.

=== Actuncan North and South's connection ===
During the time of divine rule at Actuncan, the North and South sections had a layout that helped to facilitate the connection between the spiritual and political power of the rulers. Both sections were connected by a large pathways that likely supported ritual processions. The layout of Actuncan places the main political administrative center and palace (Structure 19A) in Actuncan North directly facing and opposing Actuncan South's main triadic temple complex. In a procession heading south from Actuncan North to Actuncan South, the procession would pass through the ball court, which acted as a sort of portal from the human (Actuncan North) to the supernatural (Actuncan South) world, further highlighting the connection between the civic duty and divine rule of the ruler.

During the shift away from divine rule during the Terminal Classic period, the Actuncan residents decided to separate divine and political power. This switch was reflected by the physical modification to structures that reflected that connection. At this time, some new monumental architecture was constructed, such as a new administrative and political buildings with communal patio-spaces. Another new building also arose in Actuncan South that blocked the main entrance to the plaza and separated Actuncan South from the sacbe connecting Actuncan North, creating a physical divide between Actuncan North and South representative of the divide the new political institution and the religious one. Many existing structures were either renovated and reconverted to serve other functions, or actively dismantled for construction materials, such as the E-Group and the past main administrative building and palace (Structure 19A) for the divine leadership. This dismantling of past divine rule structures likely symbolized the change in political power and the end of divine leadership.

== Excavations and interpretations ==
The Actuncan Archaeological Project has held several excavations since 2001 with a focus on understanding the shift from a kingship to state-level society. The Actuncan Archaeological Project was directed by Dr. Lisa LeCount (University of Alabama) from 2001 to 2023 and is currently directed by Dr. David Mixter (Binghamton University). In addition to establishing Actuncan's architectural history and urban settlement, project members have documented variation in household economics and social status, changes in elite and non-elite household production through time, the distribution of artifacts and features to reveal the nature of ancient land tenure, and the relationship between Actuncan's noble residents and royalty at Xunantunich through excavations at the site's palace.

Methods and analyses at the site include remote sensing to find buried site features, soil chemical composition to identify activity areas, human osteological analyses to recognize differences in diet, burial practices, ancestor veneration, and immigration status, stone tool raw materials sourcing to document external exchange links, and pottery form and function to detect noble food preparation and storage.

In the 2010 field project, emphasis was placed on studying the organizational changes that occurred within the household as a result of a shift in power and the actions of rulers, while most excavations focused on changes in monumental architecture. Long-established families would likely be more resistant to giving up power and resources to the ruler, while new, up-and-coming families would likely side with leaders in order to gain power and resources for themselves. Therefore, during the development of a state-level society, one could expect to see the disruption in the growth and the subsequent breaking-up of large households, while the new households would expand and grow at a rate that is quicker than expected.

=== Mapping ===
Actuncan was originally mapped by James McGovern in the 1990s with the Xunantunich Archaeological Project, but at the time, Actuncan was covered by dense trees making visibility low. Today, much of Actuncan has been cleared for farming and cattle. In 2010, archaeologists decided to remap the site with the better visual of the architecture. In order to better understand the layout of the site, the lives of the people who occupied it, and how they used the land, topographic and architectural data was recorded and mapped.

=== Patio-focused groups ===
Group 1 consists of 4 structures (Structures 59, 60, 61, 62) surrounding an inner patio in Actuncan North. Structure 59 was flanked by smaller platforms that appeared to possibly function as slightly raised work areas. Artifacts from this structure include ceramics, lithic debris, obsidian, and a great diversity of other materials, suggesting that it could've been used as a multi-use workshop. At Structures 61 and 62, ceramics have been found dating to the Terminal Classic period, while little Terminal Classic pottery was discovered at Structure 59. This suggests that this portion of Group 1 was not inhabited or in use during this period, with activities focusing on Structures 61 and 62. Group 1 was first constructed in the Middle Preclassic period and grew in size during the Terminal Late Preclassic and the Late Classic.

=== Elite Houses ===
Structure 41 was an elite house in Actuncan North was excavated in 2010 with the goal of defining the layout of the structure. This pyramidal structure supported plastered northern and southern terraces, and likely consisted of a large interior are with rooms located in the front and back. The original facade of Structure 41 consisted of finely, cut limestone with small, fitted stones that was then plastered. After the end of divine rule, the structure appears to have been modified. Large stacked stone as opposed to cut one, then stuccoed over. This suggest that the modified facade was not constructed with the most precision and care compared to its original elite house construction during the Classic period, and likely a result of the termination of the elite house and its renovation for other uses, such as a ritual space during the Terminal Classic.

=== C-shaped complex ===
Group 4 consists of Structures 33, 34, and 35 site atop a large platform in Actuncan North. The site appears oddly placed and excavations sought to gain a better understanding of this groups usage. It appears that this structure was a new public space built in the middle of the already established civic center. It has been suggested that this C-shaped complex could've function as a council house during the Terminal Classic and Early Postclassic periods. This new civic space construction project seems to reflect the changing political situation that occurred during the Terminal Classic period.

=== E-Group and Structure 19A ===
Both the E-Group and Structure 19A (the main administrative center and palace) were important during the time of divine rule, but their importance was lost during the shift away from divine leadership. Residents in the Terminal Classic period decided to vacate these buildings and fill and seal off the rooms, showing the disregard of Actuncan's divine and royal past. They also chose to deconstruct these buildings for construction materials. During excavations, very little of the stones used for the construction and facade remained on the structure, yet only a small about of these stones and debris remained around the structures. This indicates that the stones were intentionally removed and didn't fall off the structures over time due to natural processes.

=== Open space ===
The space between buildings can be used to better understand the relationship and community ties of the people at Actuncan. In order to do this, posthole diggers were used to take periodic ground samples along a predetermined grid in order to sample the density of macroartifacts and microartifacts, as well as take soil samples.

==== Macroartifacts ====
Macroartifacts are often subjected to post-deposition disturbances, that carry them away from their original contexts. In this instance, macroartifacts were defined as being greater than a quarter inch in size. In total, 2,369 macroartifacts were collected with a majority appearing close to architecture. This could be due to macroartifacts susceptibility to being swept away from more open spaces or that activity was concentrated around structures. Most of the macroartifacts collected were ceramics and chipped stones.

==== Microartifacts ====
Microartifacts are artifacts that are less than a quarter inch in size. They rarely move from where they are originally deposited because they are often trampled into the surface they are deposited on. In total, 74 microartifacts were analyzed and suggested that activities were not limited to just around architecture, but also occurred in open spaces between buildings. Like macroartifacts, ceramics and chipped stones accounted for the majority of microartifacts.

==== Soil Samples ====
Soil samples were collected and tested for chemical residues. Specific residues often come from human activities and can be telling about what activities were performed within a particular space. In total, 711 samples were collect, with a few being collected offsite as a control. The deposition of phosphorus can often be linked to organics from food preparation and eating, while manganese can indicate the disposal of organic waste. The deposition of iron can indicate the use of pigment used in ritual ceremonies. The levels of phosphorus, manganese, and iron around Group 1 indicate that this area might've been used for ritual practice and ceremonial feasting by the community.
