= UniSource Energy Services =

Electric and natural gas utility in Arizona, US

UniSource Energy Services is an electric and natural gas utility company serving Arizona in the United States. It is a subsidiary of Fortis.

W. B. Foshay Co., a predecessor of Citizens Communications, acquired Southern Arizona Power of Nogales and Desert Power and Water of Kingman in 1927.

In 2003, UniSource Energy (later UNS) acquired Citizen's Arizona gas and electric operations in 2003 and renamed them UniSource Energy Services. In 2013, Fortis announced its acquisition of UNS.
