= Buenavista del Cayo =

Map of regions in Belize

Buenavista del Cayo is a classic period Mayan urban center located in the Mopan River Valley of Belize. The site dates to 300-900AD and was used as a marketplace for merchants to sell material goods. Data suggests that the plazas were in use from the Middle Preclassic through the Terminal Classic Periods. The Maya lowlands fostered a diverse economy of individuals with different economic goals. Buenavista del Cayo attracted both merchants and consumers from other settlements in the surrounding valley. Evidence found at the site suggests that both practical and prestige items were sold at the marketplace, indicating the presence of both wealthy and poor individuals. Distinct platforms found in the plazas along with the differentiation of goods by material type support the theory that the site was used as a central marketplace in the Maya lowlands.

== Project background ==
From 1984 to 1989 the Mopan-Macal Triangle Project (MMT) at San Diego State University conducted six seasons of archaeological fieldwork to investigate the sociobehavioral organization of the Maya lowlands during the Classic Period. Surveys conducted in the Valley region of Belize suggested that the area would be suitable for a marketplace. Bernadette Cap's dissertation at the University of Wisconsin-Madison suggests the theory that Buenavista del Cayo was used as a central marketplace for the surrounding lowlands. Fieldwork conducted in 2007 by the Mopan Valley Archaeological Project sought to answer this question through mapping the spatial distribution of different artifacts and comparing them to platform locations.

== Site location ==
Buenavista del Cayo is located in the Mopan Valley of Belize above the junction of the Mopan and Macal rivers. It is on the western side of Belize in the Cayo district. This region fosters diverse environmental zones with different agricultural and material resources. The East Plaza is surrounded by relatively flat terrain and is the largest of Buenavista's plazas. Entrance points into the East Plaza include a causeway in the southwest area of the plaza and a large gap in the perimeter. Buenavista del Cayo has open plazas, unrestricted access, and a layout for easy internal circulation.

== Findings ==
Excavation of the southern region of the East Plaza revealed three short limestone platforms. Ceramics found among these platforms show that they were in use from the Preclassic though the Late Classic periods. In the center of the plaza, a series of large limestone rocks with 20–70 cm of space between them were found. In the southwest corner of the plaza a semi-circular platform dating to the Early Classic period was partially uncovered. Shovel tests conducted across the plaza uncovered chert, ceramic, and obsidian debris. The highest frequencies of these items were located in different regions of the plaza.

== Archaeological analysis ==
The presence of chert, ceramic, and obsidian debris near distinct platforms found in separate areas of the plaza led archaeologists to believe that the platforms were used as vendor stalls. The vendors were likely located in different sections of the plaza, differentiated by the type of goods they sold. The series of large limestone rocks in the center of the plaza is theorized to have been used to direct traffic though the marketplace and differentiate vendor space. Buenavista del Cayo is thought to have been a central marketplace where people from surrounding settlements came to buy and sell goods from the Middle Preclassic though the Terminal Classic periods (300-900AD). The variety of materials found at the site suggest that there was a diverse socioeconomic class ranging from wealthy to poor.
