= Rankine Generating Station =

Coordinates: 43.0745°N 79.0787°W

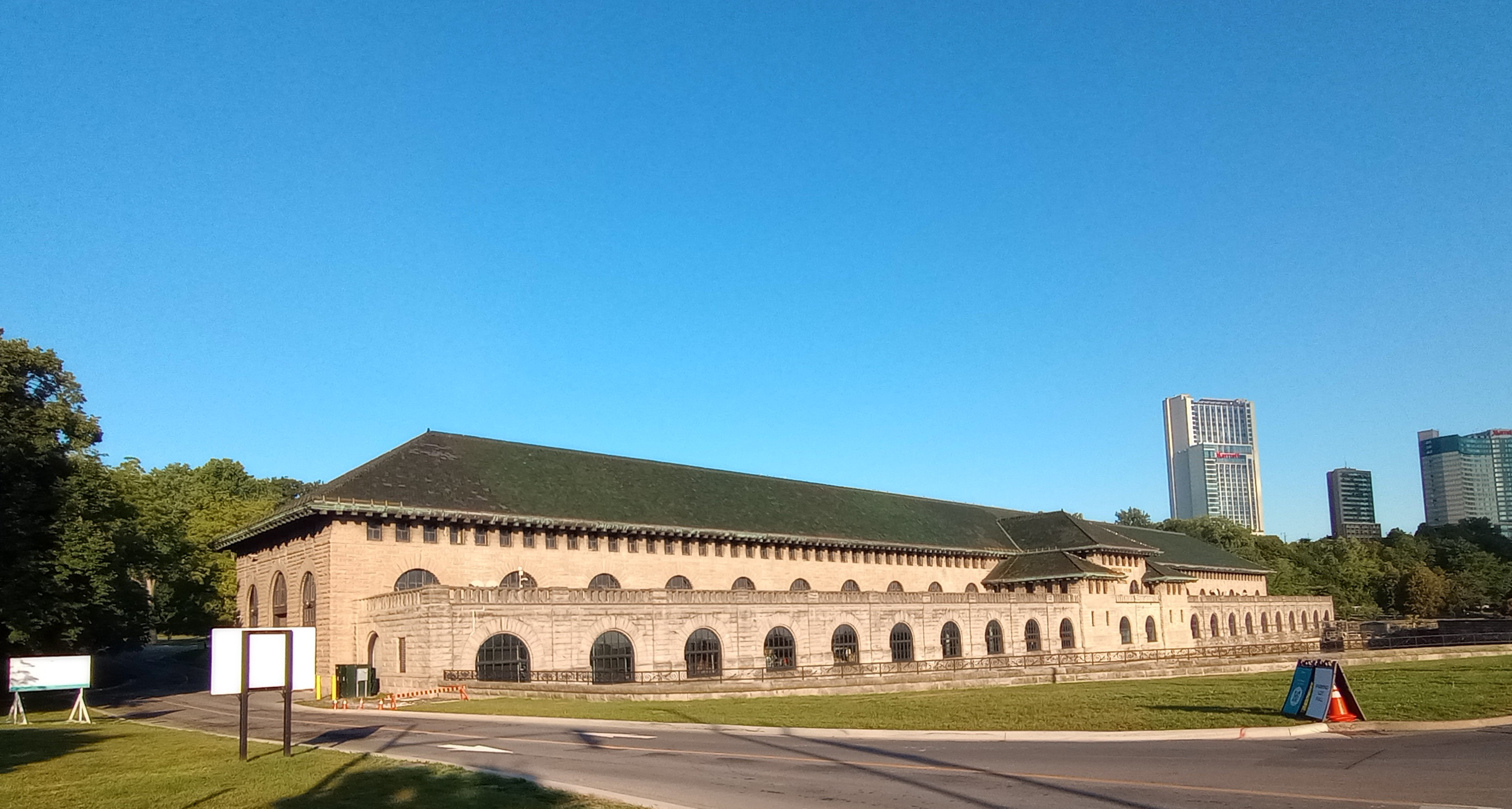
- The station building in August 2025
- Interactive map of Rankine Generating Station
- Location: Ontario, Canada
- Nearest city: Niagara Falls

History
- Built: 1905
- Original use: Hydro generating station

Site notes
- Architect: William Grace Company / Hamilton Bridge Works Company
- Current use: Tourist museum on hydro power generation
- Governing body: Niagara Parks Commission

The Rankine Generating Station is a former hydro-electric generating station along the Canadian side of the Niagara River in Niagara Falls, Ontario, slightly downstream from the older Toronto Power Generating Station. It was built in for the Canadian Niagara Power Company, and was simply known as the Canadian Niagara Power Company powerhouse. The company had been founded by William Birch Rankine, a New York City (and later of Niagara Falls) lawyer. The station opened in January 1905, with two generators; William Birch Rankine (not to be confused with William J. M. Rankine) died three days after a third generator started operation at the station, in September 1905, and the station was renamed in his honour in 1927. Acquired by Niagara Mohawk Power Corporation in 1950 and in 2002, the station became a wholly owned subsidiary of FortisOntario (and part of Canadian owned Fortis Inc.). It was decommissioned in 2006.

It reopened in July 2021 as a museum.

== Generating capacity ==
The facility, also known as The Canadian Niagara Power Generating Station, contained eleven vertical axle, 25 Hertz generators rated at 8320 kVA each for a total generating capacity of 100 MVA. When opening in 1905, the plant was equipped with only five turbines and generators. The generators were based on a design by Nikola Tesla. Peak capacity was achieved in 1924 when additional 25-cycle generator units were installed. The mechanism consisted of "11 vertical steel shafts, each running from a turbine in the deep pit to a generator 130 feet above". Power was transmitted to a transformer station in another Niagara Falls, Ontario location via underground cables.

A September 2019 report provided these additional specifics:

Housing 11 vertical penstocks, water from the Niagara River would enter through the forebay and drop 180 ft (54.8 metres) before being expelled into a 2,000 ft (609.6 metres) tunnel that emptied into the lower Niagara River, right at the base of the Horseshoe Falls.

The station was licensed to generate a maximum of 76.4MW of 25 Hz AC current using its eleven generators. By the 1950s, most other Ontario power plants were producing 60 Hz power but this station was allowed to continue at 25 Hz since there was adequate demand.

== Station closure ==
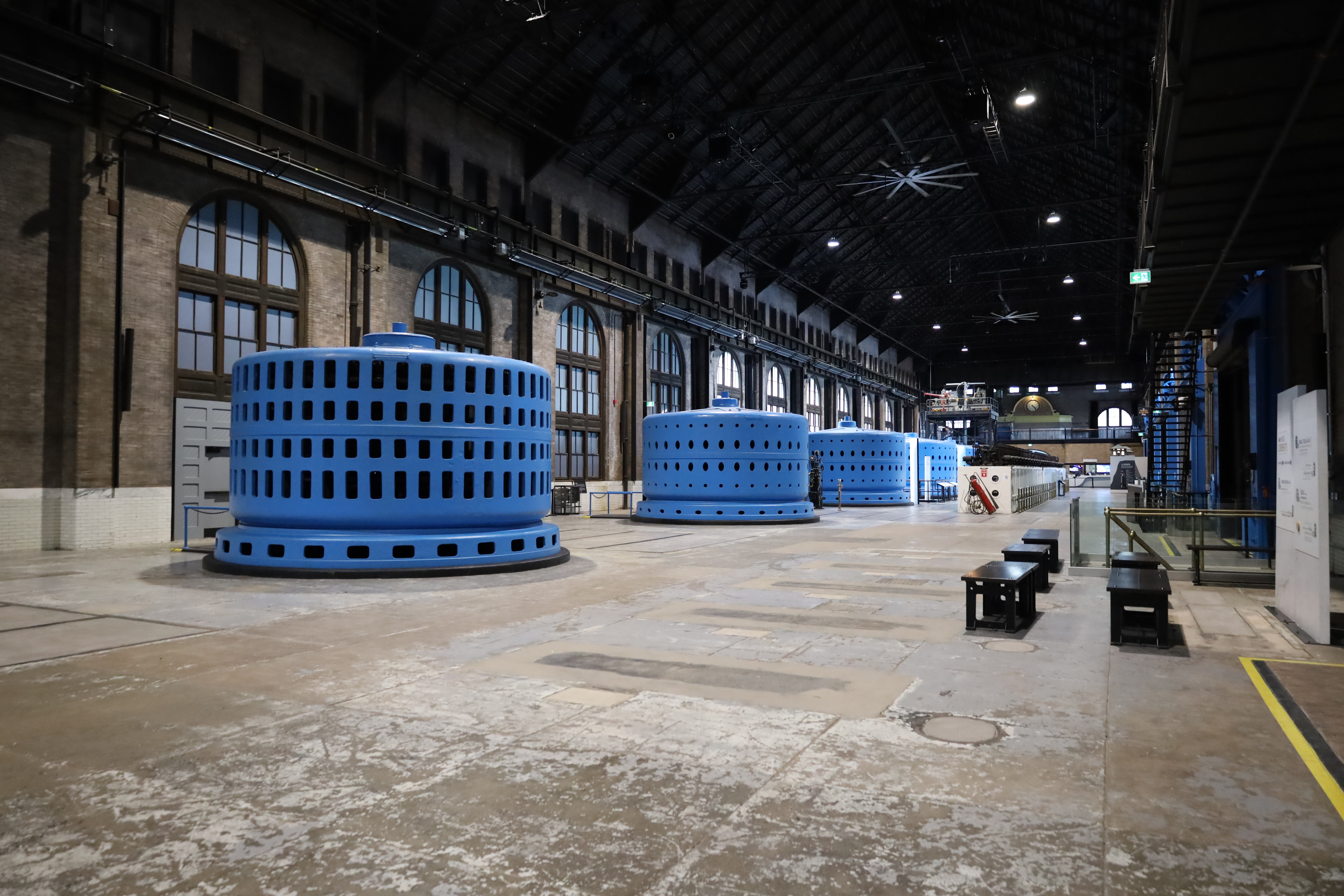
Interior of the station building in 2023

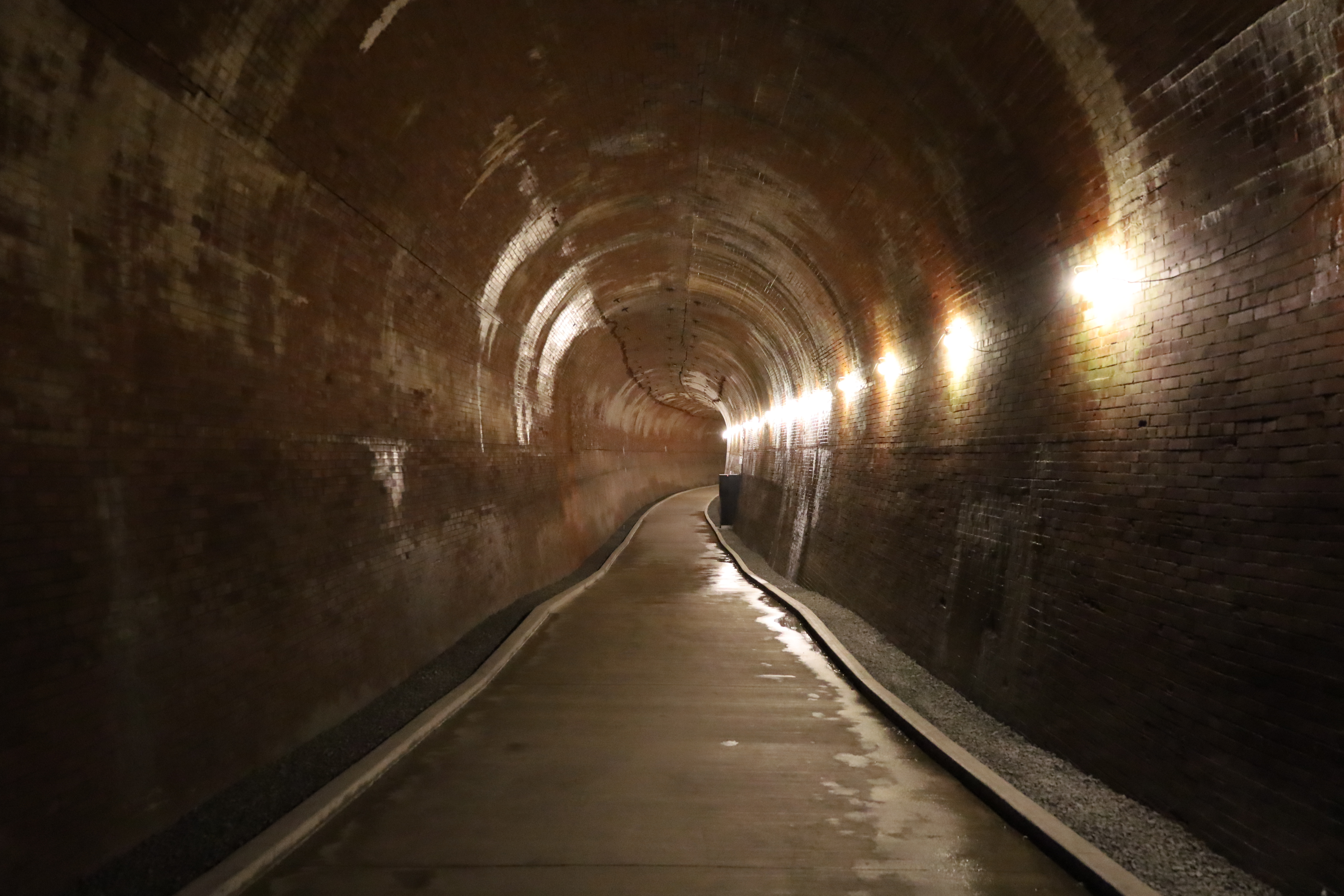
Tunnel in 2023

By 2003, the plant was no longer used constantly and was providing power on demand, typically on week days. In 2005, the station ceased operation and was officially decommissioned the following year. The Beaux-Arts architecture station was handed over to the Niagara Parks Commission in 2009. Reasons for the closure were:

- The station produced 25 Hz power, and would have needed to be retrofitted to the North American standard of 60 Hz
- The turbines and generators had drifted out of alignment due to movement of the rock on which the station was built

In 2009 Rankine station's water rights, along with those of two other nearby generating stations, were reallocated to the Sir Adam Beck stations a few kilometres downstream (see also Niagara Tunnel Project).

== Re-opening as a tourism site ==
Star Wars theme performed on a Tesla coil for a tour at the Rankine Generating Station, 2024

Photographs and video clips published in 2012 indicated that much of the interior of the plant was in excellent condition. In October 2019, the Niagara Parks Commission publicized plans to re-open the facility in 2021 as a historic industrial site for the purposes of tourism. A report by a journalist who visited the station indicated that the interior remained pristine, with generators painted blue and "doors and enormous hinges made of copper, mosaic tile floors, a beautiful clock at one end of the main hall, marble control panels with old school switches that date to the 1920s, and fittings and other instruments".

== William B. Rankine Generating Station Bridge ==
William B. Rankine Generating Station Bridge is a five span stone arch bridge that cross the water inlet to the power station north of Fraser Hill. The main bridge carries traffic on Niagara Parkway and smaller pedestrian bridge is located at the mouth of the outlet on the shores of the Niagara River. The bridge was rehabilitated in a project that ran from 2012 to 2014; it now has four wide traffic lanes and a separate pedestrian lane.
