= Southwest Gas =

Energy company

Southwest Gas Holdings, Inc.
- Company type: Public
- Traded as: NYSE: SWX; S&P 400 Component
- Founded: March 1931; 95 years ago
- Headquarters: Las Vegas, Nevada, U.S.
- Key people: Michael J. Melarkey (Chairman of the Board); Karen S. Haller (President & CEO); Gregory J. Peterson (Senior VP & CFO); Lori Colvin (Vice President & Controller)
- Revenue: ▲US$ 2.55 billion (2017)
- Operating income: ▲US$ 323.70 million (2017)
- Net income: ▲US$ 193.84 million (2017)
- Total assets: ▲US$ 6.24 billion (2017)
- Total equity: ▲US$ 1.81 billion (2017)
- Number of employees: 2,285 (2017)
- Website: SWGas.com

Southwest Gas Holdings, Inc. (NYSE: SWX) is an investor-owned utility based in Las Vegas, Nevada, United States.

The company provides natural gas service to over 2 million residential, commercial, and industrial customers in parts of Arizona, Nevada, and California. At the end of 2021, Southwest had 1.15 million customers located in Arizona, 0.8 million in Nevada, and 0.2 million in California.

== History ==
The company was founded in Barstow, California, in 1931, and soon expanded to the nearby town of Victorville. Natural gas was brought into southern Nevada in 1953, and Southwest Gas began service to the burgeoning communities of Las Vegas and Henderson the following year.

On January 24, 1956, Southwest Gas Corporation became a publicly owned company. Expansion into Arizona occurred in 1957 with the acquisition of Natural Gas Service of Arizona, which served customers in Gila, Greenlee, and Pinal counties.

In 1963, with the completion of a 250-mile pipeline in northern Nevada, the company was able to grow once again by extending its service territory to include Carson City. Several years later it began serving customers as far east as Elko in the northern part of the state. Expansion also occurred during this time in California with expansion from its Victorville operations to Big Bear.

During the next several decades the company made several more acquisitions and expanded in parts of its tri-state service territory. In 1979, the purchase of the gas system of what is now Tucson Electric Power, and the 1984 purchase of the gas system of Arizona Public Service Company, added the Phoenix area to the company's customer base. During a time of unprecedented growth in the desert Southwest, Southwest Gas was serving some of the fastest-growing areas in the country. In 2005, the company acquired service territory in South Lake Tahoe from Avista, enabling it to serve customers contiguously around Lake Tahoe in California and Nevada. The company is the largest distributor of natural gas in Arizona and Nevada.
