= List of storms named Nadine =

The name Nadine has been used for thirteen tropical cyclones worldwide, four in the Atlantic Ocean, and nine in the Western Pacific Ocean.

In the Atlantic:

- Tropical Storm Nadine (2000) – did not threaten land
- Hurricane Nadine (2012) – long-lived and erratic Category 1 hurricane that churned in the open ocean
- Tropical Storm Nadine (2018) – never affected land
- Tropical Storm Nadine (2024) – short-lived storm, made landfall in Belize

In the Western Pacific:

- Typhoon Nadine (1948) (T4804)
- Typhoon Nadine (1956) (T5621)
- Typhoon Nadine (1960) (T6004)
- Typhoon Nadine (1962) (T6237)
- Tropical Storm Nadine (1965) (T6519, 22W)
- Tropical Storm Nadine (1968) (T6805, 08W, Didang)
- Typhoon Nadine (1971) (T7118, Sisang)
- Tropical Storm Nadine (1974) (T7417, Norming)
- Tropical Storm Nadine (1978) (T7801)
