= Chalillo Dam =

Dam in Cayo District, Belize

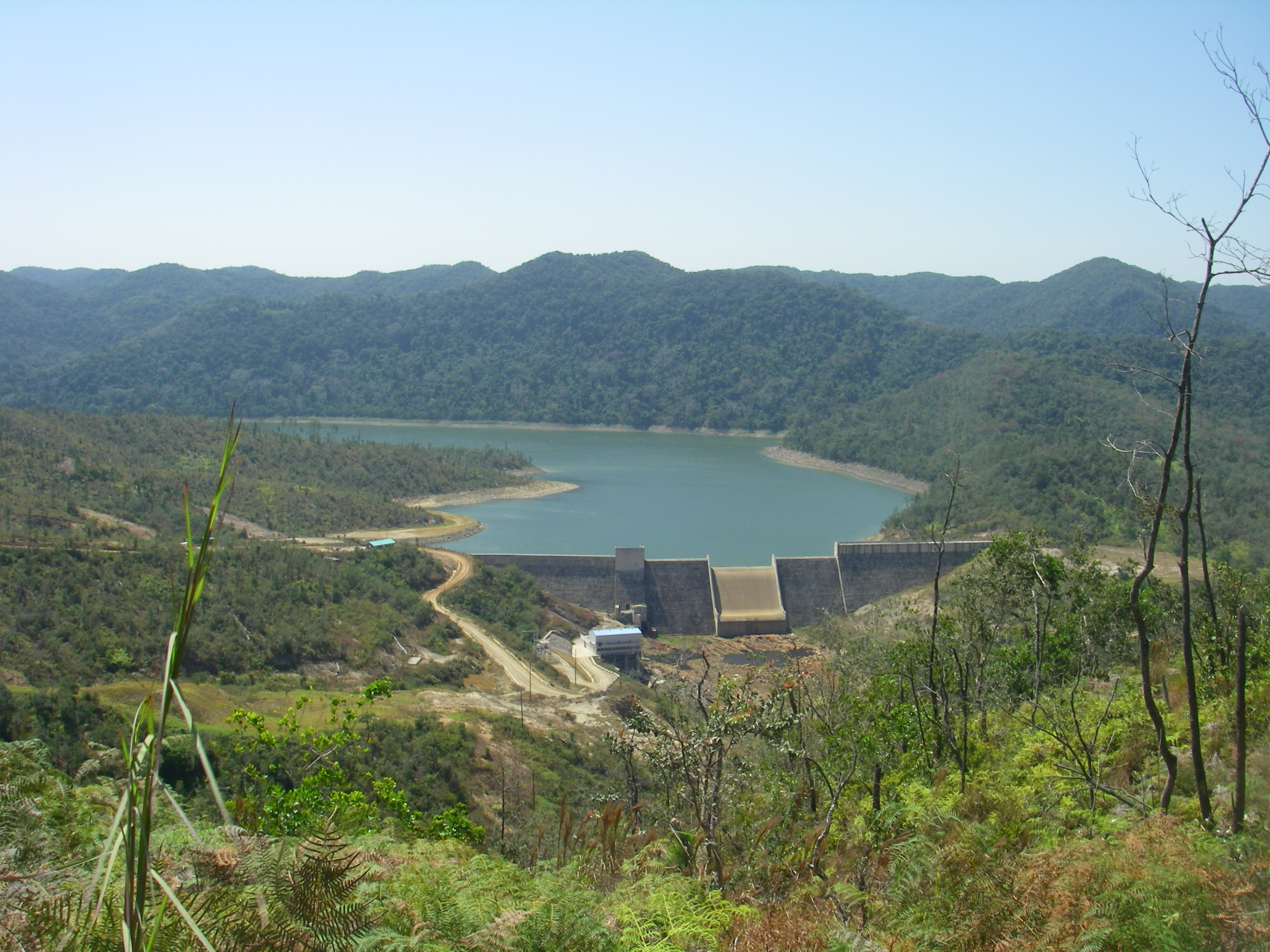

- Location within Belize
- Country: Belize
- Location: Cayo
- Coordinates: 16°51′41.09″N 89°00′47.56″W
- Purpose: Power
- Status: Operational
- Construction began: 2002
- Opening date: 2005

Dam and spillways
- Type of dam: Gravity, roller-compacted concrete
- Impounds: Macal River
- Height: 45 m (148 ft)
- Height (foundation): 380 m (1,250 ft)
- Dam volume: 140,000 m^{3} (180,000 cu yd)

Reservoir
- Total capacity: 120,000,000 m^{3} (97,000 acre⋅ft)

Power Station
- Installed capacity: 7 MW

The Chalillo Dam is a gravity dam on the Macal River about 33 km (21 mi) south of San Ignacio in Cayo District, Belize. Chalillo Dam's maximum capacity is 7.0 MW. The dam was constructed by Sinohydro of Beijing, China, between 2002 and 2005 with the primary purpose of hydroelectric power production. The project budget was approximately US 30 million. Its construction generated controversy over its effect on the surrounding rain forest.

Two smaller dams, the Mollejon and Vaca, are downstream from the Chalillo Dam. The Mollejon has a capacity of 25.2 MW and the Vaca has a capacity of 19 MW. The three dams together meet approximately 40% of Belize's energy needs. All three dams are operated by Fortis Belize (formerly Belize Electric Company Limited).

== Location ==
Chalillo Hydroelectric Dam is situated in the westernmost part of the country where the Macal River converges with the Raspaculo River. It is located in the Maya Mountains and shares adjacency with the Chiquibul National Park and the Pine Ridge Forest Reserve. Positioning Chalillo Hydroelectric Dam approximately 16 kilometers from the Guatemalan border.

== Purpose ==
The primary purpose of Chalillo Hydroelectric Dam is to impound the water in the 46m storage dam during the rainy season and release during shortage. At the base of the dam, through a low level valve, water is released during the dry period. Basically, water is carried from the dam downstream to the powerhouse which protects the generating Kaplan turbines. Subsequent to powering the electric turbines, the water drifts back into the Macal River through the tailrace channel and back to its natural route towards its sister facility, Mollejon hydroelectric power plant.

== Production ==
All necessary equipment and controls required for the production of power is contained in the Power House. The circular steel pen stock which is about 80 meters in length and 2.4 meters in diameter facilitates the transport of water from the dam to the power plant. The Kaplan turbine generators equipped with adjustable blades, modern electronic and hydraulic systems help in the production of power. Subsequently, the power is delivered through the 115Kv line which is interconnected to Mollejon switchyard. Power is then distributed to BEL's grid via Mollejon.

== Controversies ==
The Chalillo Dam has been controversial since its inception and has been the subject of multiple lawsuits. Most of the controversy surrounding the dam concerns its impact on the environment, specifically on the ecosystems of the Macal River and the Chiquibul Forest. As described in a report commissioned as part of the Environmental Impact Assessment for the dam, the area flooded by the dam's reservoir "contains a rare and discrete floral floodplain habitat which acts as both a conduit and critical habitat for resident and non-resident fauna and avifauna." Notably, the area was a nesting site for the endangered northern subspecies of the Scarlet macaw. There have also been concerns about the safety of the dam, as it was built only 550 meters from a fault line. If the dam were to break, it would imperil the downstream town of San Ignacio.

Belizean environmental groups sued to stop the construction of the dam. In their lawsuit, they argued that the Environmental Impact Assessment for the dam was flawed and inadequate. The case was eventually appealed to the Judicial Committee of the Privy Council, becoming the first environmental case ever heard by that body. In a split 3-2 ruling, the Privy Council discounted the flaws in the EIA and allowed the project to proceed. The fight against the dam was chronicled in the 2009 book The Last Flight of the Scarlet Macaw by Bruce Barcott. After the completion of the dam, the Belize Institute of Environmental Law and Policy (BELPO) sued Fortis, alleging the company failed to monitor water quality in the Macal River and did not implement an adequate emergency warning system in case the dam broke.
