= Mopan River =

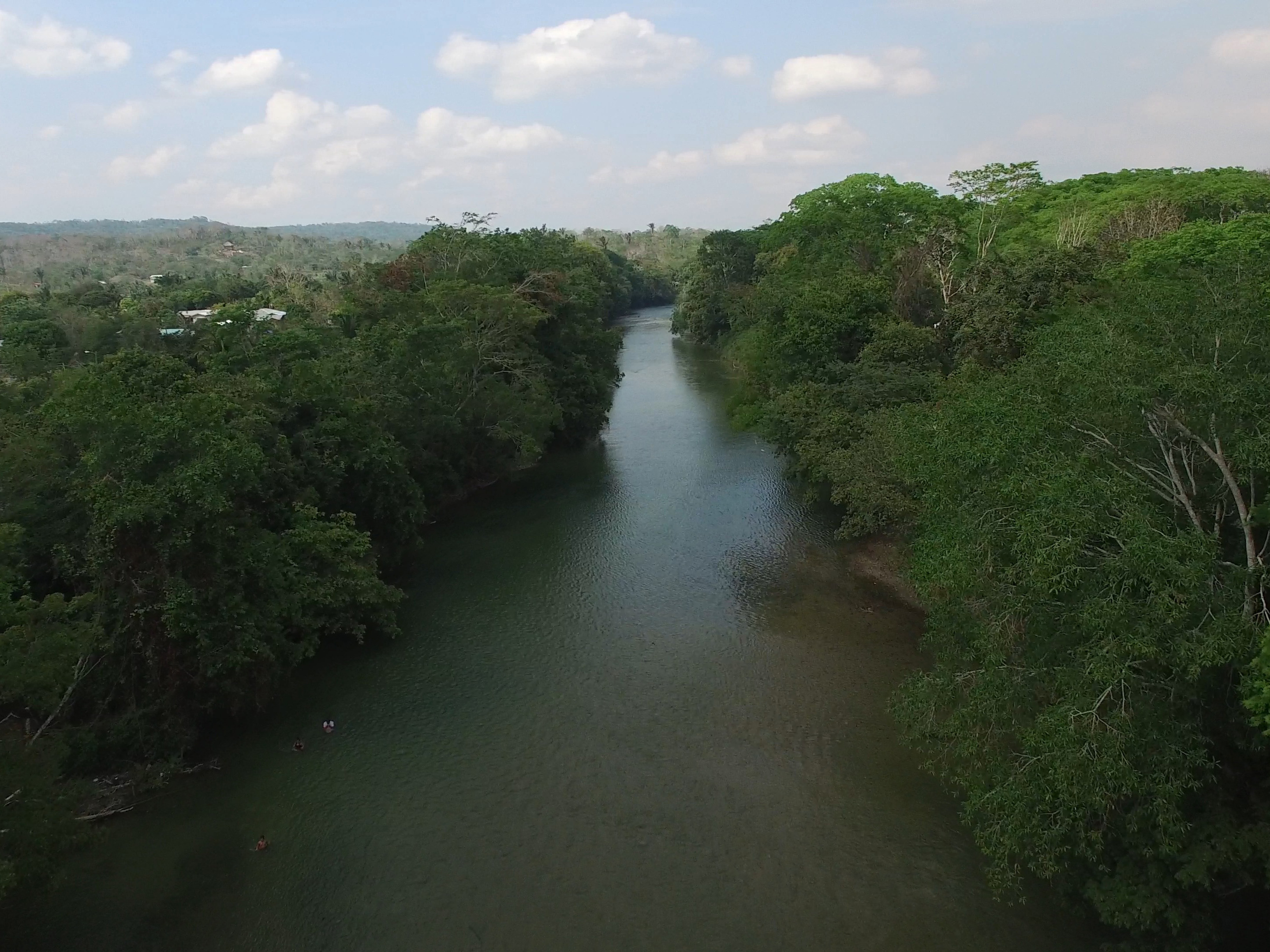
- Mopan River at Bullet Tree Falls

Location
- Countries: Guatemala and Belize

Physical characteristics
- Source
  - location: Guatemala
  - coordinates: 16.97021°N 89.21119°W
  - elevation: 850 m (2,790 ft)
- Mouth
  - location: Belize (affluent of Belize River)
  - coordinates: 17.17742°N 89.08082°W
  - elevation: 50 m (160 ft)

The Mopan River is a river in Central America spanning the Petén Department of Guatemala and the Cayo District of Belize. It merges with the Macal River at Branch Mouth, Belize, forming the Belize River, which ultimately discharges into the Caribbean Sea. The drainage area of the combined watershed is 9,434.2 km^{2} (3,642.6 sq mi). Tributaries of the Mopan include Chiquibul Branch, Ceiba Grande, Salisipuedes, and Delores.

== Hydrology ==
The Mopan River's rate of discharge has been measured regularly since 1981 at the river gauge station in Benque Viejo, Belize. According to these measurements, the river's annual mean discharge varies between 20 and 40 m^{3}/s. The highest rate ever recorded was 404 m^{3}/s in November 1990.

Although the Mopan may contribute to downstream flooding during the rainy season, it responds much slower to rain storms than the other major tributary of the Belize River, the Macal. Both rivers yield similar volumes on average, but the Mopan watershed is less mountainous than the Macal watershed, giving it less intense flood waves.

== Pollution ==
The combined Mopan River/Belize River watershed contains 11% of the population of the Peten District in Guatemala and 45% of the population of Belize. These populations depend on the river for drinking water and other domestic uses; however, water quality is degraded from sediment, nutrient loading, untreated sewage discharge, pesticides and other toxins. The major source of degradation is the extensive deforestation in the upper reaches and non-sustainable agriculture. Karper and Boles have asserted: "The greater Mopan/Belize River Catchment provides a prime example of a watershed under stress from extensive non-sustainable agricultural practices that have occurred within the region over the past three decades." Slash-and-burn agricultural practices by native peoples are contributing to such watershed degradation.

== Maya sites ==
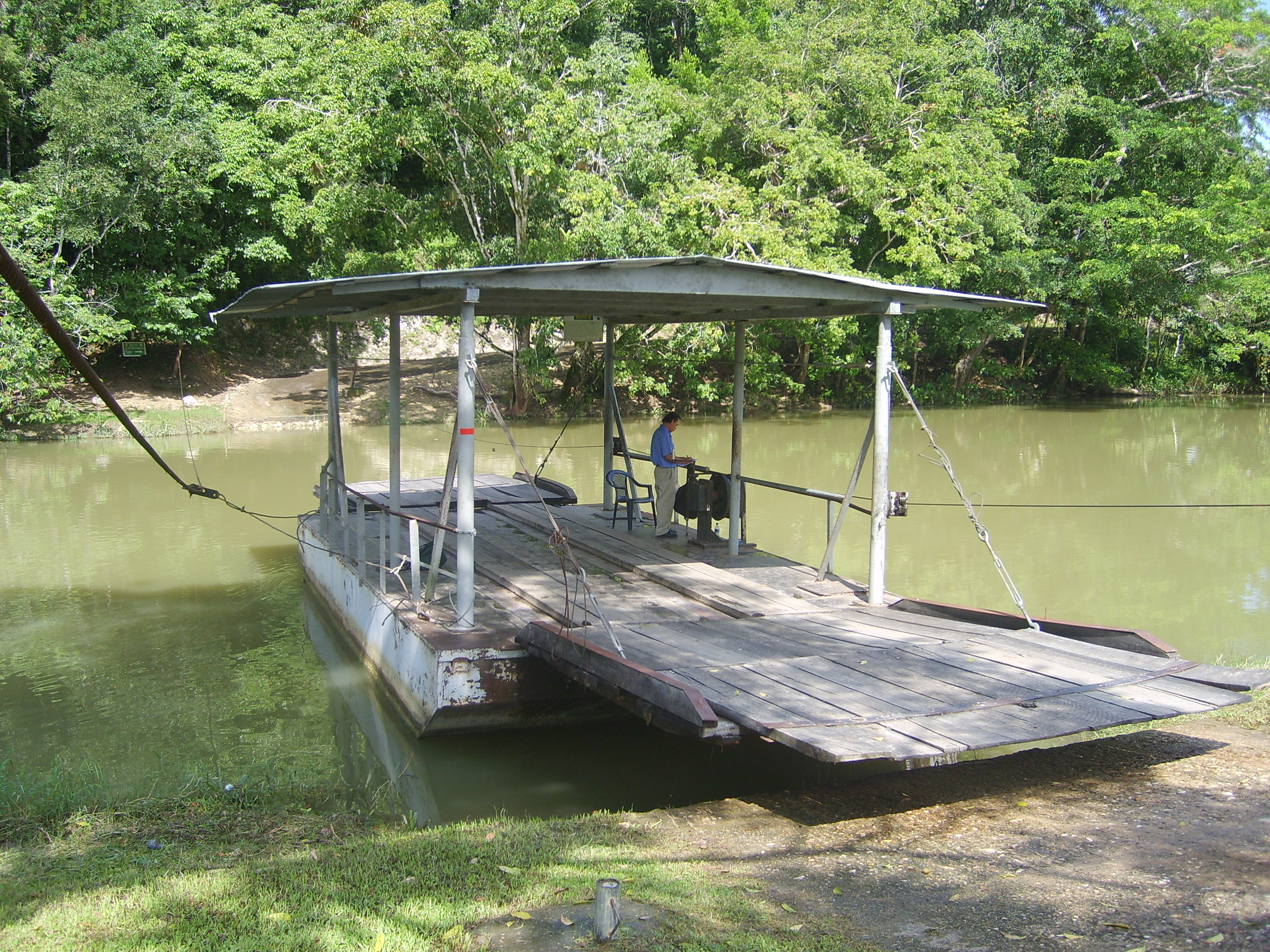
A hand-cranked ferry takes visitors across the river to the Maya site of Xunantunich.

Several important Maya archaeological sites are situated along the Mopan River. From upriver to downriver, these include Ucanal, Arenal, Xunantunich, Actuncan, and Buenavista del Cayo. Several of these sites and associated settlement areas have been studied as part of the Mopan Valley Archaeology Project. Archaeological surveys have identified the remains of several hundred ancient structures in these areas, with the highest density occurring in the area near Xunantunich.

== Recreation ==
Popular activities on the Mopan River include kayaking and river tubing.
