= Canadian Niagara Power =

Canadian electrical utility, founded 1892

Canadian Niagara Power Inc.
- Formerly: Canadian Niagara Power Company
- Company type: Subsidiary
- Industry: Electric Utilities
- Founded: 1892; 134 years ago
- Founder: William Birch Rankine
- Headquarters: Niagara Falls, Ontario (original HQ); Fort Erie, Ontario (under FortisOntario)
- Areas served: Fort Erie and Port Colborne, Ontario
- Products: Transmission and Distribution
- Owner: Fortis Inc.
- Parent: FortisOntario
- Website: cnpower.com

Canadian Niagara Power Inc. is an electricity transmission and distribution utility servicing Fort Erie and Port Colborne, Ontario. Founded in 1892 as the Canadian Niagara Power Company, it operated the Rankine Generating Station (Rankin GS) from 1905 to 2006.

Founded in Niagara Falls, Ontario, by American William Birch Rankine, the company was acquired by Niagara Mohawk Power Corporation in 1950 and owned by Fortis Inc. since 2002. With the closure of the Rankine GS in 2009, the company now focuses on power distribution and transmission network.
