= Tucson Electric Power =

Utility company in Tucson, Arizona

- Company type: Subsidiary
- Industry: Electric utilities
- Founded: 1892; 134 years ago
- Area served: Southern Arizona
- Key people: Susan Gray (president and CEO); Caleb Adcock (vice president and CFO)
- Parent: Fortis
- Website: www.tep.com

Tucson Electric Power (TEP) is an electric utility company serving southern Arizona in the United States. It is a subsidiary of Fortis, which announced its acquisition of parent company UNS Energy in 2013.

Kino Veterans Memorial Stadium, a baseball stadium on Tucson's south side, was once named Tucson Electric Park for TEP.

== History ==
Around 1882, Royal A. Johnson started a light plant in Tucson in order replace Tucson's oil lamps with electric lights. His new idea received little support and his plant went belly-up after a couple years.

Frank E. "Red" Russell, an employee of the Western Union Telegraph Co., in Tucson, on occasion did repairs on the Arctic Ice Works, an ice plant that was also owned by Johnson. He learned of the failed light plant a few years earlier. This association with Johnson sparked an interest in lighting Tucson.

In 1892, Russell was one of a group of individuals that came together to form the Tucson Electric Light & Power Co. which was located at 116–120 N. Church Street (now Church Ave). Russell was named the first manager-operator of this new firm and was paid $40 a month. Four years later the company purchased the Tucson Gas Company and by 1901 it was known as the Tucson Gas, Electric Light and Power Co. In January 1902, J.J. Henry purchased the utility. A month later, he sold it to U.S. Light and Traction Company.

In 1904, the generating facilities for the Tucson Gas, Electric Light and Power Co. were relocated to West Sixth Street, across from the Russell family home at 306 W. Sixth St. This new site would later serve as Tucson Electric Power Co.’s headquarters, from 1967 to 1999.

By 1907, Tucson Gas, Electric Light and Power Co. came under common ownership with Tucson Rapid Transit. In 1910, United States Light and Traction was acquired by the newly formed Federal Light and Traction.

In 1930, control of Federal Light and Traction was acquired by Cities Service. After the passage of the Public Utility Holding Company Act of 1935, Federal Light and Traction/Cities Service was forced to sell most of their operations. Tucson Rapid Transit was sold to W. Culver White, John B. Tigrett, A.V. Lindseth and L.A. Tanner. Tucson Gas & Electric was sold in a public offering.

In 1979, the gas operations were sold to Southwest Gas and the company was renamed Tucson Electric Power.

In 1998, TEP created a new holding company, UniSource Energy. TEP became a subsidiary

In 2016, Tucson Electric Power publicly announced a community partnership with a leading US Circular Economy apparel manufacturer with the intention to purchase its blue employee volunteer shirts from Fed By Threads, a Tucson-based company. TEP’s Volunteer Shirts Help Fight Hunger Ethical Apparel: Fed By Threads | Green America

Note: The new Tucson Electric Power headquarters at 88 E. Broadway sits on land that was part of the ground that Russell as a Tucson City Councilman and others obtained back in 1899.

== Rooftop solar rates ==
For customers with rooftop solar panels who have a system to store excess energy, TEP proposed new rates with the Arizona Corporation Commission in 2018. The commissioners could incorporate an order made by an administrative law judge in April 2018 which recommended a special rate for solar customers who have home battery storage systems.
