= Macal River =

Macal
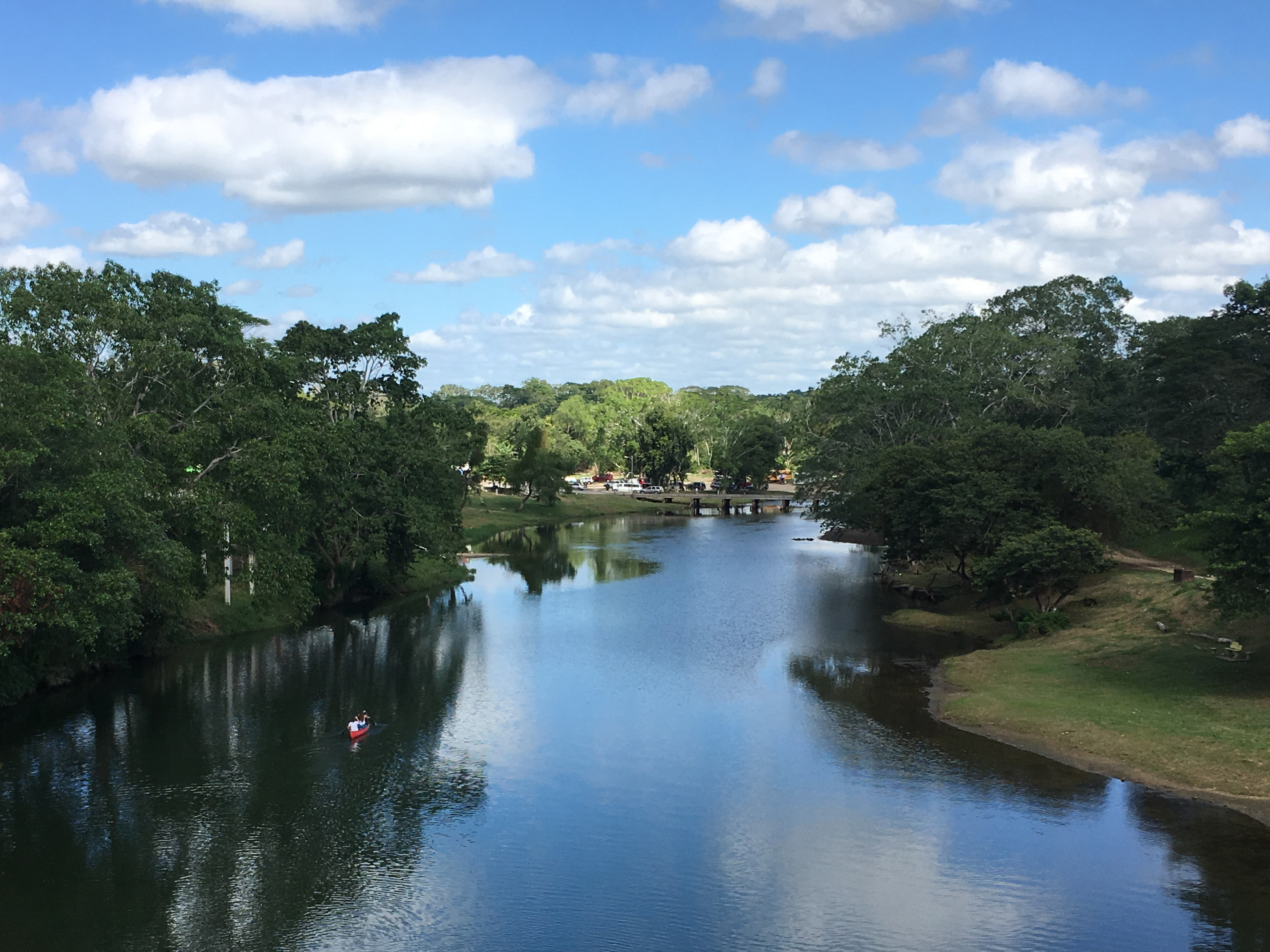
- Macal River in Belize

Location
- Country: Belize

Physical characteristics
- Source
  - location: Maya Mountains
  - elevation: 953 m (3,127 ft) (Cooma Cairn)
- Mouth
  - location: Belize River
  - coordinates: 17°10′41″N 89°4′49″W
- Length: 320 km (200 mi)
- Basin size: 1,492 km^{2} (576 sq mi)

The Macal River is a river running through Cayo District in western Belize. Sites along the river include the ancient Mayan town of Cahal Pech and the Belize Botanic Gardens. The Macal River discharges into the Belize River. There are several tributaries to the Macal River including the following streams: Privassion, Rio On, Rio Frio, Mollejon and Cacao Camp.

The size of the Macal River catchment basin is approximately 1,492 square kilometers. The Macal River rises in a rugged portion of the Maya Mountains and flows in a northerly direction where it joins with the Mopan River to form the Belize River. Lying to the east of the Macal River Basin is the Cockscomb Basin Wildlife Sanctuary, the premier sanctuary established specifically for conservation of the jaguar.

Due to the steep terrain of the headwaters region and the high rainfall of the upper Macal Basin, the Macal River is subject to rapid stage height rise, contributing significantly to the downstream flooding of the Belize River. By legend, the river is named after a beautiful young girl Macall, an uncommon name. The lower river is navigated year-around with canoes.

== Hydrology ==
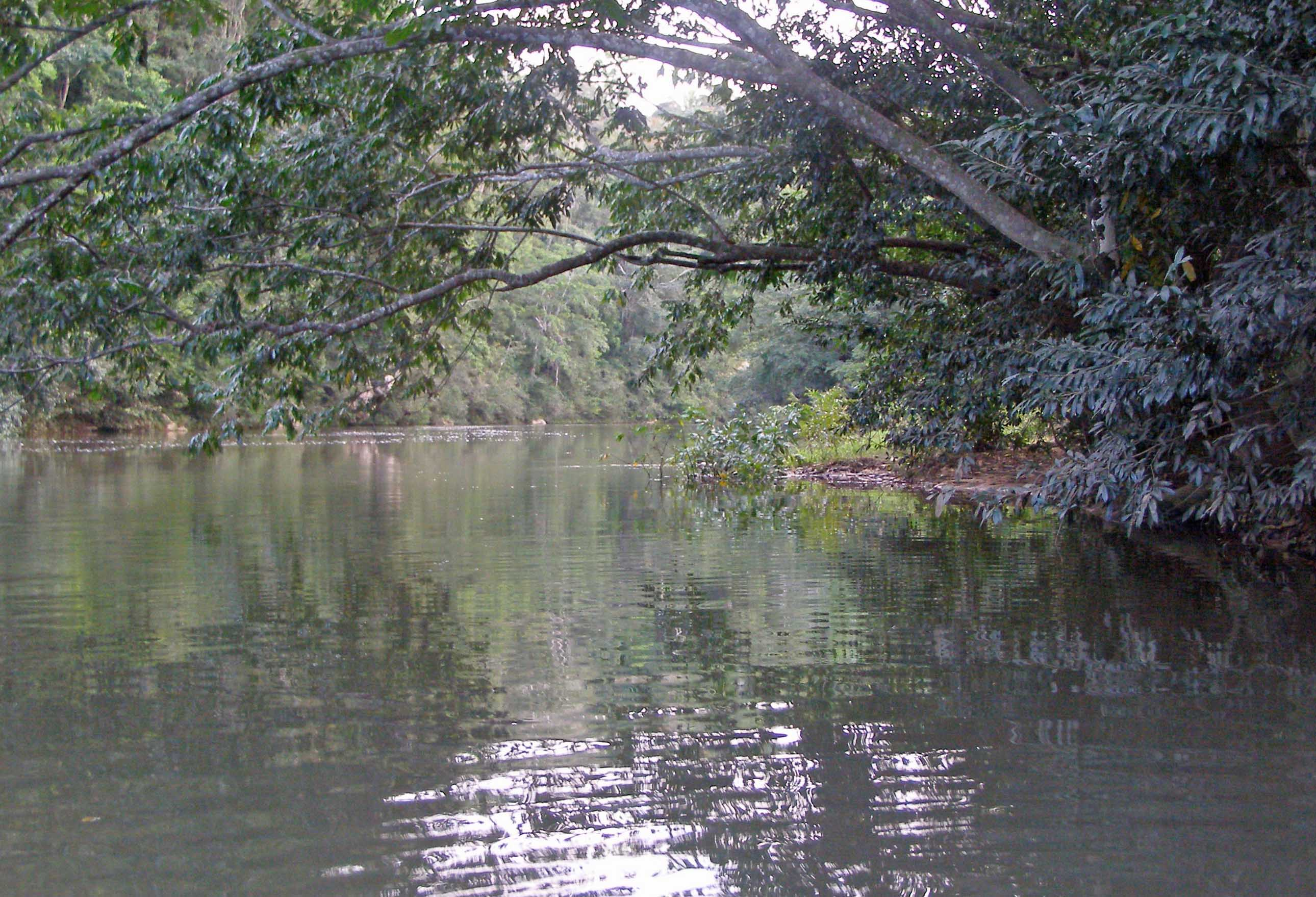
Looking upriver in the lower Macal River.

The Macal Rivershed is divided into two sub catchment basins. The headwaters and upper basin comprise about 1000 square kilometers and rest in the southern Maya Mountains, whilst the lower basin is known as the Mountain Pine Ridge catchment. The soils in the upper watershed tend to be shallow and rocky, leading to rapid runoff. All of the upper catchment tributaries join the mainstem channel considerably before Guacamayo, the approximate join point of the two connecting sub-sheds of the Macal River. Peak flows follow the rainy season of June to August, with tailing rains until February; lowest flows are in the dry season from March to May.

For the lower Macal River catchment (or Mountain Pine Ridge area), tributary streams are arranged radially to feed the mainstem; principal lower basin rivers are the Privassion, Rio On, Rio Frio, Mollejon, Chaa Creek and Cacao Camp. In the lower catchment basin, there is considerable overland friction to surface runoff due to the dense terrestrial detrititus and understory on the forest floor, even though the forest canopy itself is sometimes sparse. The retarded runoff of this lower sub-watershed allows the rapid peak runoff of the upper watershed to overtake the flow within Mountain Pine Ridge, forming an effective single massive peak wave, which exacerbates downstream flooding in the Belize River, and, in fact, controls the flood stage of the larger Belize River. This effect of simultaneous peak flow is further enhanced by the radial geometry of the lower Macal Basin tributaries, encouraging all sub-basin flow to reach the mainstem at approximately the same time.

== Ecology ==
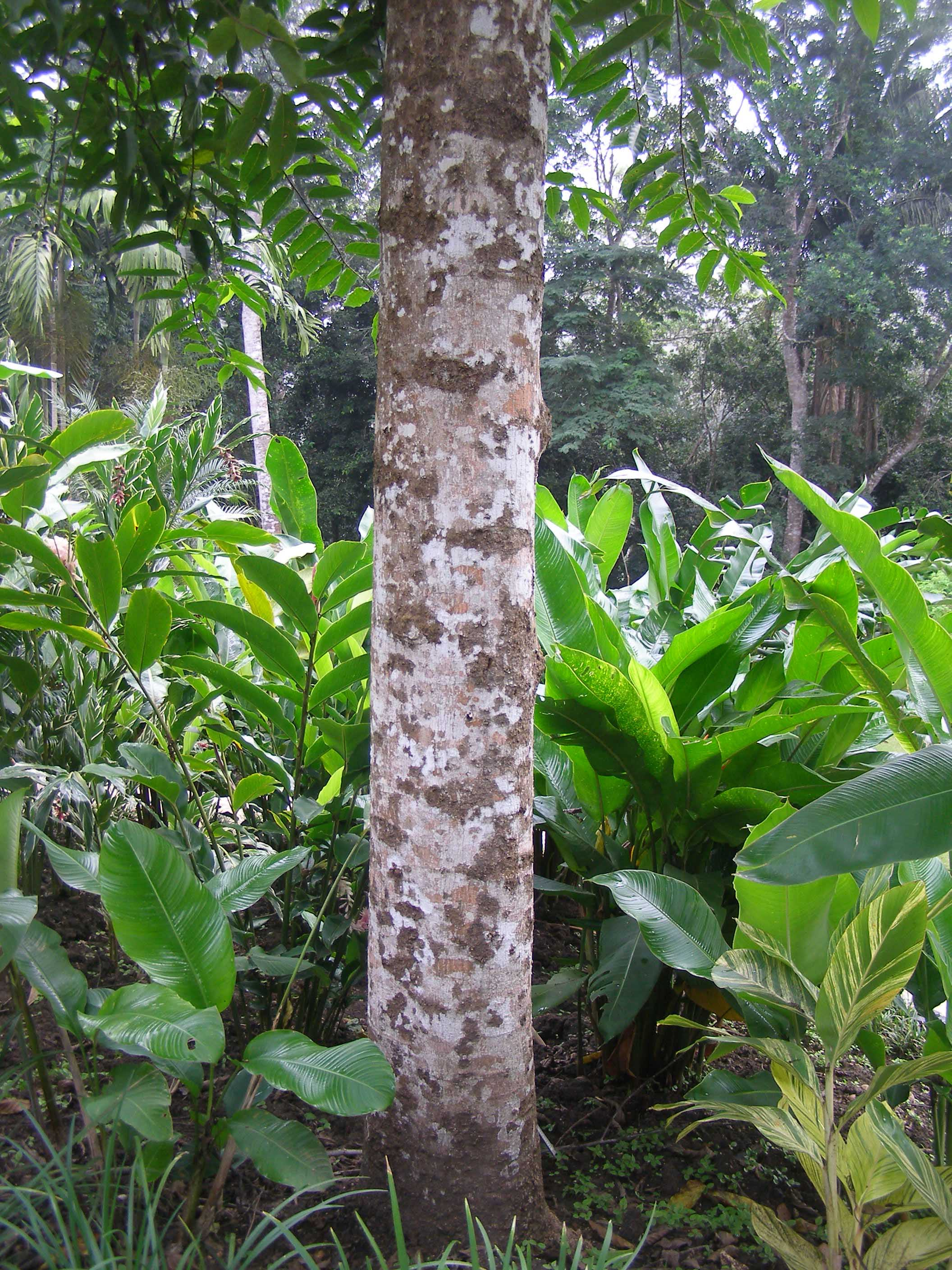
Lower Macal watershed.

The Macal River winds through large expanses of primary and secondary growth broadleaf tropical forest, including a substantial tract of the Chiquibul Forest Reserve and National Park The watershed consists of closed canopy upland forests as well as a fertile floodplain, which is often overgrown with dense jungle vegetation trailing into the verges of the river itself. Considerable biodiversity is found within the Macal River catchment basin, including megafauna, avafauna, fish, reptiles, amphibians, as well as smaller mammals, arthropods and plants.

The Macal watershed is habitat to over a dozen rare and endangered species. Two Important threatened megafauna found here are the jaguar, Panthera onca, and Belize's largest land animal, Baird's tapir, Tapirus bairdii, which is also the national animal of Belize.

There is abundant birdlife in the Macal Basin; for example, in the Mountain Pine Ridge sub-watershed alone are found: the rufous-capped warbler, crossbill, pine siskin and eastern bluebird. Between autumn and spring, the hepatic tanager and chipping sparrow are also evident. Raptors hunt among the valleys of Mountain Pine Ridge, and affords the most probable location in Belize to observe the orange-breasted falcon.

=== Dam ===
The Chalillo Hydroelectric Dam was completed on the river in 2005 by Fortis Inc., the Canadian owner of the national electrical utility, about 33 km (21 mi) south of San Ignacio, Belize. The construction generated controversy over its effect on the surrounding rain forest.

== Prehistory ==
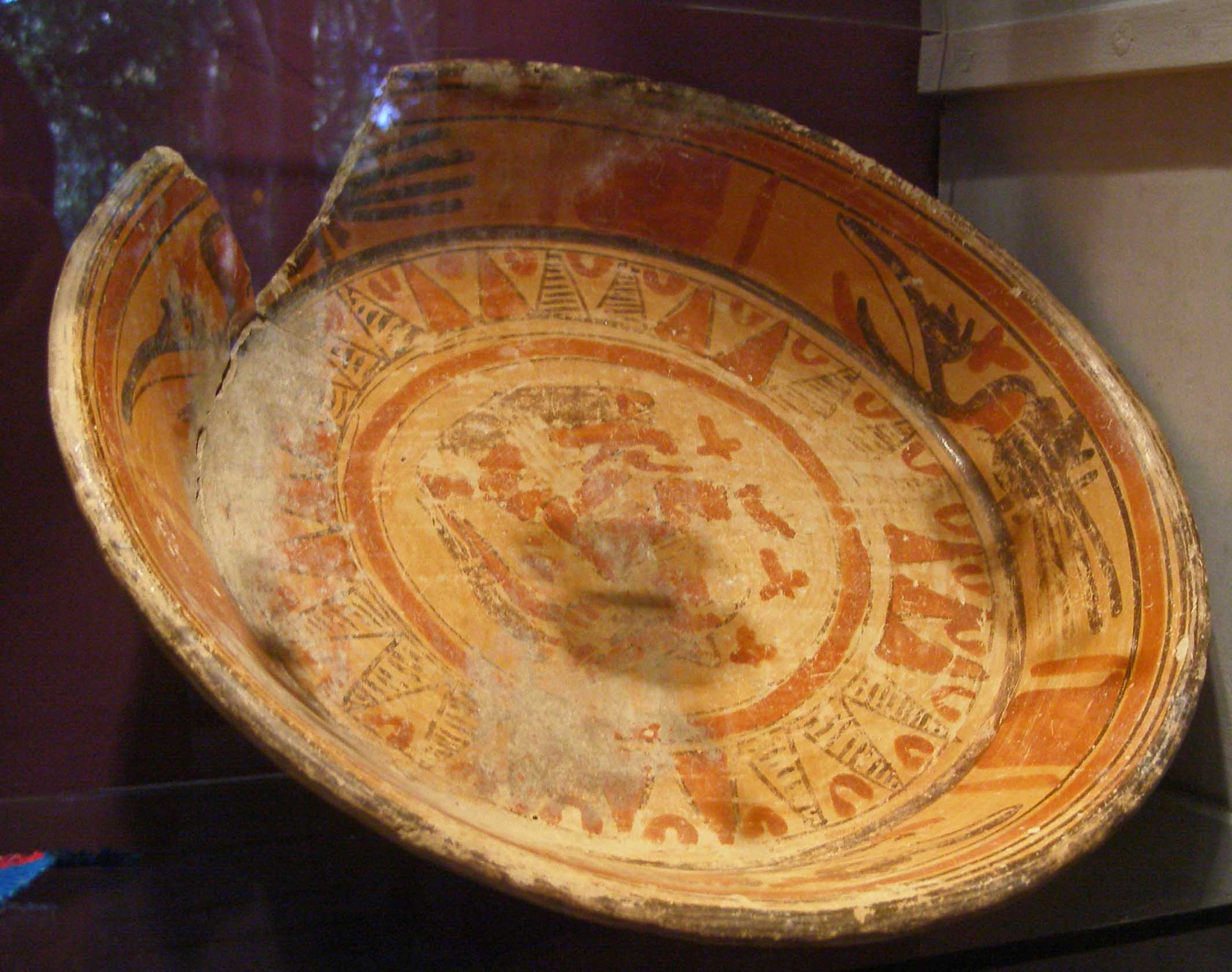
Original Mayan bowl discovered in the Macal River lower watershed.

The lower portions of the Macal Watershed were extensively occupied by the ancient Maya. Several regional habitations are identifiable, including the Cahal Pech site and the unexcavated site at Chaa Creek. These sites were centroids for larger farming populations, and are deemed to be satellite cities that may have been under the influence of Tikal or Caracol. The Mayan urban society collapsed in this watershed in the ninth century AD, likely related to the exhaustion of agricultural resources, or reaching of the limited carrying capacity of this region of nutrient poor soils, with possible aggravation of social factors.

== Ecotourism ==
Whilst the highest reaches of the watershed are only accessible to the most hardy of hikers, the Mountain Pine Ridge area is available to travellers by auto (not bus). Most of the recreation in this reach is within the Mountain Pine Ridge Forest Reserve, a national Park of Belize. In addition to hiking trails into the wilderness, this reach is the location of Belize's largest limestone caverns, which allow subsurface exploration by tube flotation on the clear aquifers which are illuminated by occasional vertical light shafts reaching the surface. The most extensive of these aqueous caverns is the Rio Frio area.

In the lowest reach there are a number of jungle resorts which offer access to the banks of the Macal for flotation or canoe trips to San Ignacio. Except for the peak flow periods of June to October, it is feasible to canoe upstream against the current in this reach. There are several rapids in the lower reach, but overall canoeing difficulty is only moderate. There is a replica working Mayan farm and a morpho butterfly preserve as well as a small Mayan museum in the lower watershed on the western side of the Macal River.

== See also ==
- Karst
- Logging
- Slash-and-burn
