= UNS Energy =

UNS Energy is the parent company of Tucson Electric Power and UniSource Energy Services.

== History ==
UniSource Energy was started in 1998 as the parent company for Tucson Electric Power. In 2003, the company acquired Citizens Communications's Arizona gas and electric operations in 2003 and renamed them UniSource Energy Services.

On August 24, 2004, the company restated its net income, and the new figure is $113.9 million in 2003, $34.9 million in 2002 and $63.8 million in 2001.

The company changed its name to UNS Energy in 2012.

In 2013, Fortis announced its acquisition of UNS and completed this in August 2014.
