= Fortis Inc. =

Canadian utility company, founded 1987

- Type: Public
- Traded as: TSX: FTS; NYSE: FTS; S&P/TSX 60 component
- Industry: Electricity generation & distribution, Natural Gas Distribution
- Founded: 1987; 39 years ago
- Founder: Angus Bruneau
- Headquarters: St. John's, Newfoundland and Labrador, Canada
- Key people: David Hutchens, President & CEO
- Products: Electricity, Natural Gas
- Revenue: ▼CA$11.5 billion (2024)
- Operating income: ▲CA$3.29 billion (2024)
- Net income: ▲CA$1.83 billion (2024)
- Total assets: ▲CA$73.5 billion (2024)
- Total equity: ▲CA$23.8 billion (2024)
- Number of employees: 9,800 (2024)
- Website: www.fortisinc.com

Fortis Inc. is a Canadian electric utility holding company, based in St. John's, Newfoundland and Labrador. It operates in Canada, the United States, Central America and the Caribbean. In 2015, revenue was CA$6.7 billion.

Fortis was formed in 1987, when shareholders of the regulated transmission and distribution utility Newfoundland Light & Power Co. voted to form a separate holding company. NL&P shares were exchanged for Fortis shares on a one-to-one basis, with the regulated NL&P becoming a 100% owned subsidiary.

== Expansion ==
The company expanded into Western Canada in 2003 with its purchase of the Canadian assets of Aquila, Inc., formerly owned by TransAlta, Canada's largest publicly traded utility. As a result of this acquisition, Fortis became one of Alberta's major regulated electrical distribution companies, serving 415,000 Albertans in 2005. ATCO Electric is Alberta's other regulated distribution company. Also as a result of the 2003 acquisition, Fortis owns regulated generation, transmission, and distribution assets in British Columbia.

In 2007, Fortis acquired Terasen Gas from Kinder Morgan, which had sold the BC gas utility as a non-strategic asset included in its 2005 acquisition of Terasen Inc.

In addition to its regulated Canadian assets, Fortis also owns unregulated assets in Ontario, British Columbia, and Newfoundland. The majority of its unregulated business consists of hydroelectric generating plants.

Fortis' interests in the Caribbean include a 67% interest in Belize Electricity Limited (BEL) and a 95% interest in Belize Electric Co. Ltd. The Belize Association of Non-Government Organisations took Fortis to the Judicial Committee of the Privy Council in 2003 to have a new environmental assessment of the Chalillo Dam on the Macal River which was a hydroelectricity development project. Ecologists were concerned over the future of species such as the scarlet macaw, the tapir and the black howler monkey as the project would flood 10 km^{2} of rainforest in Belize. Celebrities such as Harrison Ford and Cameron Diaz supported a movement to stop this dam. Fortis and the Government of Belize supported the project.

On May 30, 2011, it was announced that Fortis has plans to acquire Central Vermont Public Service, an electric utility in the US state of Vermont, for US$700 million, pending stockholder and regulatory approval; this acquisition would be Fortis' first utility acquisition in the United States. Gaz Métro offered a higher price and acquired CVPS.

On February 21, 2012, CH Energy Group (a holding company for Central Hudson Gas & Electric, an upstate New York utility), announced a pending acquisition by Fortis valued at $1.5 billion. On June 27, 2013, Fortis Inc. closed on its acquisition of CHG.

In 2013, Fortis announced its acquisition of UNS Energy, an Arizona utility company.

On February 9, 2016, Fortis announced an agreement to acquire ITC Holdings Corp., the largest independent transmission utility in the United States, for US$11.3 billion in cash and stock.

== Operations ==
Fortis currently owns the following regulated utilities:

- FortisBC, a utility in British Columbia
- FortisAlberta Inc., a holding company for assets purchased from Aquila, Inc.
- Central Hudson Gas & Electric, a utility in New York
- Tucson Electric Power and UniSource Energy Services, utilities in Arizona
- Newfoundland Power, serving 85% of the population of Newfoundland and Labrador; Fortis' original operating electric power subsidiary
- Maritime Electric, serving 90% of the population of Prince Edward Island
- FortisOntario, a holding company for Canadian Niagara Power Company, Cornwall Electric, and Algoma Power
- Caribbean Utilities, a utility in the Cayman Islands
- ITC Transmission, Novi, Michigan

Fortis also operates one non-regulated companies:

- Fortis Generation, hydro generation in New York state and central Newfoundland.

== See also ==
- Emera Incorporated Another Canadian Maritime Multinational Energy Operator/Investor begun as Nova Scotia Power.
