= Electricity sector in Canada =

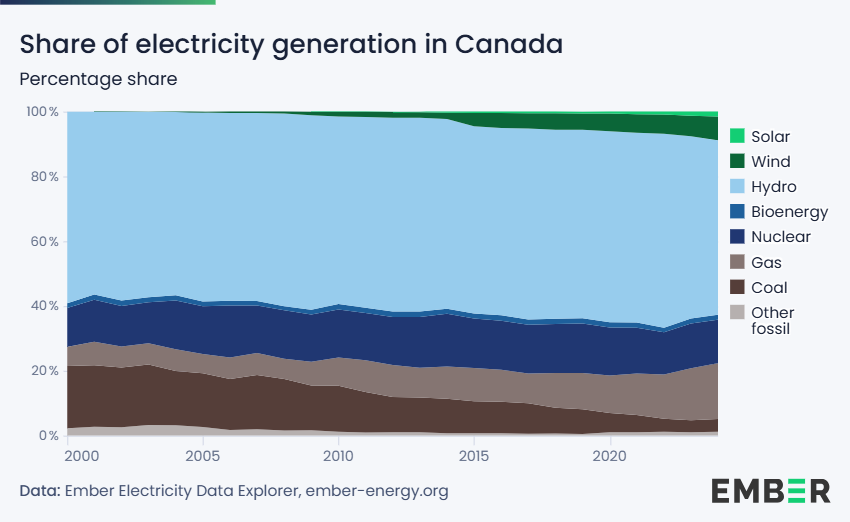
Share of electricity generation in Canada - percentage share

Electricity generation by source in 2023

- Hydro: 57.4 (57.4%)
- Natural gas: 15.4 (15.4%)
- Nuclear: 13.5 (13.5%)
- Non-hydro renewables: 9.1 (9.1%)
- Coal: 3.5 (3.5%)
- Petroleum/others: 1.1 (1.1%)

The electricity sector in Canada has played a significant role in the economic and political life of the country since the late 19th century. The sector is organized along provincial and territorial lines. In a majority of provinces, large government-owned integrated public utilities play a leading role in the generation, transmission, and distribution of electricity. Ontario and Alberta have created electricity markets in the last decade to increase investment and competition in this sector of the economy.

Hydroelectricity accounted for 60% of all electric generation in Canada in 2018, making Canada the world's third-largest producer of hydroelectricity after China and Brazil. Since 1960, large hydroelectric projects, especially in Quebec, Newfoundland and Labrador, British Columbia, and Manitoba have significantly increased the country's generation capacity.

The second-largest single source of power (15% of the total) is nuclear power, with several plants in Ontario generating more than half of that province's electricity, and one generator in New Brunswick. This makes Canada the world's sixth-largest producer of electricity generated by nuclear power, producing 95 TWh in 2017.

Fossil fuels generate 18% of Canadian electricity, about half as coal (7% of the total) and the remainder a mix of natural gas and oil. Only three provinces use coal for electricity generation. Saskatchewan, New Brunswick, and Nova Scotia rely on coal for less than half their generation while other provinces and territories burn none for electricity. Alberta and Saskatchewan also use a substantial amount of natural gas. Remote communities including all of Nunavut and much of the Northwest Territories produce most of their electricity from diesel generators, at high economic and environmental cost. The federal government has set up initiatives to reduce dependence on diesel-fired electricity. However, in 2018, the NWT generated 70% of their electricity from hydroelectric dams and 4% from wind. In Nunavut, solar generates a small amount of electricity through small installations and projects.

Non-hydro renewables are a fast-growing portion of the total, at 7% in 2016.

Canada has substantial electricity trade with the neighbouring United States amounting to 72 TWh exports and 10 TWh imports in 2017.

Canadian homes, offices and factories are large users of electricity, or hydro, as it is often called in many regions of Canada. In 2007, Canadian per capita electricity consumption was among the highest in the world, with a yearly average of 17 MWh. In 2017, the average annual electricity consumption per capita in Canada dropped to 14.6 MWh. Quebec had the highest annual consumption at 21 MWh per capita, while Nunavut had the least, 6.1 MWh per capita. In 2018, electricity generation accounted for 9% of Canada's emissions, a 32% decrease from 1990.

== History ==
Electricity has been significant for Canada's economy and politics since the late 19th century. In the 1890s, three firms competed to develop the Canadian Niagara Falls. After the First World War, the provincial utilities were created. The public companies focused on rural electrification and hydroelectric development. In 1952, Canada's first nuclear power plant was built, and in 1968, the North American Energy Reliability Council(NERC) was founded

== Organization ==
The electricity sector in Canada is organized along provincial and territorial lines as part of their jurisdiction over natural resources. All provinces and territories have set up utilities boards and regulate transmission and distribution rates.

The liberalization process of the 1990s changed some parameters such as the unbundling of generation, transmission and distribution functions of incumbent utilities in order to foster a competitive wholesale market or, as in the cases of large exporters like Quebec and British Columbia, to comply with Order 888 of the Federal Energy Regulatory Commission and other U.S. market rules. Most provincial governments still maintain a strong financial stake as operators in the electrical markets.

In a majority of provinces and territories, utilities are vertically integrated Crown corporations operating as regulated monopolies. This is by and large the case in New Brunswick, Quebec, Manitoba, Saskatchewan, British Columbia and Nunavut. A second model involves a Crown corporation as a large generator or in transmission, alongside an investor-owned distributor, as in Newfoundland and Labrador, Yukon, the Northwest Territories and, to a lesser degree, Prince Edward Island. Nova Scotia has granted a virtual monopoly to Nova Scotia Power, when it divested its investments in the sector in 1992. However, there remain half a dozen small public electric distributors - the Municipal Electric Utilities of Nova Scotia who have the right to buy power from other parties, or generate their own. NS has a feed-in tariff program to encourage smaller generators.

Two provinces, Ontario and Alberta, have deregulated their electric industry to different degrees over the last decade. Both provinces operate electricity markets, but there are significant differences between the two systems. The Ontario market is a hybrid, with the Ontario Power Authority (now merged with the IESO) "contracting for supply, integrated system planning, and regulated pricing for much of Ontario's generation and load". In Alberta, the generation business is competitive, while transmission and distribution are rate-regulated.

A number of municipalities operate local distribution systems. Some of them, such as EPCOR in Edmonton, are also significant players in the power generation business, under their name or through their control of publicly traded companies.

The federal government, through the National Energy Board, issues permits for inter-provincial and international power lines. The Canadian Nuclear Safety Commission has jurisdiction over nuclear safety. Ottawa and the provinces share jurisdiction over environmental issues such as air pollution and greenhouse gas emissions. Also, major hydroelectric developments trigger federal environmental assessment processes, as the Government of Canada has the power to regulate waterways and fisheries.

Energy-intensive businesses, such as the aluminium smelting and pulp and paper industries have made significant investments over time in power generation. One such company is Rio Tinto Alcan, which owns and operates 7 hydroelectric generating stations in Quebec and British Columbia, with a combined installed capacity of 3,300 MW.

In recent years, partial or complete deregulation of the wholesale generation business have created a number of independent power producers, who build and operate power plants and sell over the long-term, through power purchase agreements — with terms of up to 35 years — and in day-ahead and hour-ahead transactions, where such markets exist.

== Generation ==

In 2013, Canada generated 651.8 terawatt-hours (TWh), a 10% increase since 2003. Approximately 822 generating stations are scattered from the Atlantic to the Pacific, for a nameplate capacity of 130,543 MW. The 100 largest generating stations in Canada have a combined capacity of 100,829 MW. In comparison, the total installed capacity of Canada was 111,000 MW in 2000.

In 2013, the leading type of power generation by utilities in Canada is hydroelectricity, with a share of 60.1%. Nuclear (15.8%), natural gas (10.3%), coal (10%), wind (1.8%), fuel oil (1.2%), biofuels and waste (0.8%), wood (0.4%) and solar (0.1%) follow. Other sources, such as petroleum coke make up the remaining 0.5%.

However, these figures do not account for the variety of provincial generation mixes. Historic producers of coal and natural gas, like Alberta (60.9%), Nova Scotia (63%), and Saskatchewan (86%) have come to rely mainly on fossil fuel power stations. In hydro-rich provinces, such as Manitoba (99.5%), Quebec (97.2%), Newfoundland and Labrador (97.1%), and British Columbia (88.7%), hydroelectric power accounts for the bulk of all electric generation.

In Canada's most populated province, Ontario Hydro has developed 11,990 MW of nuclear capacity between 1966 and 1993, building 20 CANDU reactors at 3 sites: Pickering, Darlington and Bruce. New Brunswick and by extension, Prince Edward Island, which buys 96% of its power from the neighbouring province, has a diversified mix, including a nuclear reactor and hydroelectric dams. However, the province is dependent on expensive fuel oil generation.

The electrical generating capacities of the provinces and territories in Canada are broken down below. Numbers are given in megawatts (MW) and gigawatt-hours (GWh). The tables below use 2010 data from Statistics Canada.

=== Nameplate capacity ===
Installed generating capacity (MW), by source and province or territory, 2024
Type	Canada	NL	PE	NS	NB	QC	ON	MB	SK	AB	BC	YT	NT	NU
Hydro	83,053	7,586	0	375	947	40,705	8,955	6,163	863	917	16,387	98	56	0
Wind	17,287	54	204	624	396	3,995	5,533	258	812	4,649	745	4	13	0
Solar	5,240	0	71	80	12	16	2,857	39	100	1,984	71	9	2	0
Geothermal	6	0	0	0	0	0	0	0	0	6	0	0	0	0
Thermal	50,759	605	91	1,957	3,115	1,559	24,681	314	3,976	12,601	1,577	34	142	106
Conventional Steam	20,204	508	1	1,591	1,740	591	5,435	22	2,235	6,898	1,183	0	0	0
Nuclear	14,185	0	0	0	660	0	13,525	0	0	0	0	0	0	0
Combustion turbine	15,219	0	89	366	713	781	5,585	280	1,726	5,311	348	0	20	0
Internal combustion	1,151	97	0	0	3	187	136	12	14	392	45	34	123	106
Total installed capacity	156,388	8,246	365	3,036	4,470	46,275	42,026	6,774	5,771	20,181	18,780	145	212	107

=== Total generation by type ===
Electric power generation (GWh), by source and province or territory, 2024
Type	Canada	NL	PE	NS	NB	QC	ON	MB	SK	AB	BC	YT	NT	NU
Hydro	341,824	41,070	0	728	2,629	172,164	39,283	29,423	2,407	1,826	51,730	430	133	0
Wind	45,843	174	532	1,597	983	11,013	13,862	908	2,143	12,831	1,776	5.4	18.5	0
Solar	5,234	0	32.1	2.7	2.6	14.6	2,325	1.7	55.9	2,792	3.4	0.8	3.2	0.1
Nuclear	81,735	0	0	0	1,767	0	79,969	0	0	0	0	0	0	0
Tidal	0	0	0	0	0	0	0	0	0	0	0	0	0	0
Combustible fuels	134,569	1,120	5.5	6,503	6,069	2,330	28,803	109	20,098	63,133	5,535	116	510	239
Other	283	0	0	0	0	0	0	0	129	155	0	0	0	0
Total	609,488	42,364	569	8,831	11,450	185,522	164,241	30,441	24,832	80,737	59,044	553	664	239

=== Utilities generation by fuel ===
Electricity generated from fuels by thermal plants, by province or territory, 2010 (Note: A detailed breakdown for industrial generation by fuel source is not available.)
Fuel	Canada	NL	PE	NS	NB	QC	ON	MB	SK	AB	BC	YT	NT	NU
	GWh													
Total solids	78,983.0	0	4.3	8,000.9	3,072.0	846.9	12,854.6	44.4	12,084.2	41,463.7	603.5	0	0	0
Coal	74,300.0	0	0	6,791.8	2,081.0	0	12,285.4	44.4	12,084.2	41,013.1	0	0	0	0
Wood	2,306.5	0	2.4	184.0	0	660.5	405.4	0	0	450.6	603.5	0	0	0
Petroleum coke	2,024.3	0	0	1,033.4	990.9	0	0	0	0	0	0	0	0	0
Other solid fuels	352.1	0	1.9	0	0	186.4	163.8	0	0	0	0	0	0	0
Total liquids	3,057.8	915.2	-0.5	49.9	1,307.2	367.6	60.6	17.0	17.7	12.6	62.6	25.0	61.1	161.9
Total petroleum products	3,057.7	915.2	-0.5	49.9	1307.2	367.6	60.6	17.0	17.7	12.5	62.6	25.0	61.1	161.9
Propane	0.1	0	0	0	0	0	0	0	0	0.1	0	0	0	0
Other Liquid Fuels	0	0	0	0	0	0	0	0	0	0	0	0	0	0
Total gas	34,512.6	0	0	2,274.7	1,873.4	326.2	15,020.1	22.9	3,309.2	10,775.6	1,856.5	0	27.5	0
Natural Gas	34,512.6	0	0	2,274.7	1,836.5	199.7	15,020.1	22.9	3,309.2	10,234.4	1,856.5	0	27.5	0
Methane	0	0	0	0	4.6	59.6	0	0	0	51.7	0	0	0	0
Other Gaseous Fuels	0	0	0	0	32.3	66.9	0	0	0	489.5	0	0	0	0
Uranium	85,526.6	0	0	0	0	3,551.6	81,975	0	0	0	0	0	0	0
Steam from waste heat	6,179.7	0	0	0	680.7	0	2,716.4	0	627.6	1,504.4	650.6	0	0	0

Note: Ontario eliminated coal in 2014.

=== Electricity per person and by power source ===
Electricity per person in Canada (kWh/ hab.)
	Use	Production	Export	Exp. %	Fossil	Nuclear	Nuc. %	Other RE*	Bio+waste	Wind	Non RE use*	RE %*
2004	18,408	18,733	−326	−1.8 %	4,912	2,829	15.4%	10,720	272		7,416	59.7%
2005	18,729	19,467	−738	−3.9 %	5,019	2,852	15.2%	11,315	281		7,133	61.9%
2006	18,281	19,216	−935	−5.1 %	4,740	2,862	15.7%	11,317	297		6,667	63.5%
2008	18,111	19,092	−981	−5.4 %	4,653	2,834	15.6%	11,333	272		6,506	64.1%
2009	17,507	18,566	−1,059	−6 %	4,572	2,696	15.4%	10,942	239	113	6,213	64.5%
* Other RE is waterpower, solar and geothermal electricity and windpower until 2008 * Non RE use = use – production of renewable electricity * RE % = (production of RE / use) * 100% Note: EU calculates the share of renewable energies in gross electrical consumption.

In 2009 the Canadian production of electricity was 18,566 kWh per person and domestic use about 94% of production (17,507 kWh/person). In 2008 the OECD average was 8,991 kWh/person. 64.5% of Canadian domestic electricity use was produced with the renewable sources. The non renewable electricity use, i.e. fossil and nuclear, in Canada in 2009 was 6,213 kWh/person, respectively in UK 5,579; Germany 5,811; Denmark 4,693; Spain 4,553; Finland 11,495 and the United States 12,234.

== Transmission ==
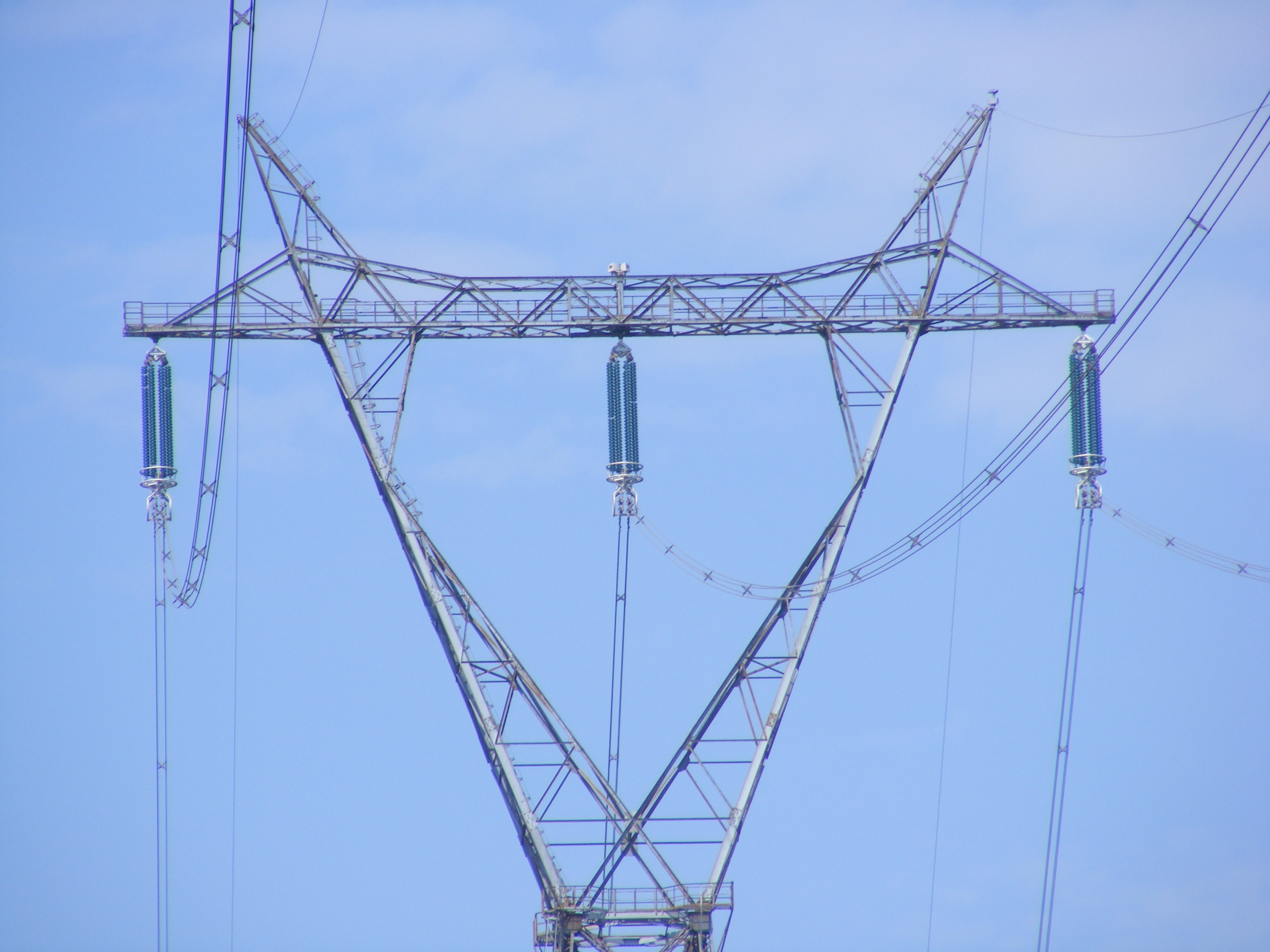
A Mae West pylon from a Hydro-Québec TransÉnergie 735 kV power line, recognizable by the x-shaped spacers separating the three 4-conductor sets. Its introduction, in 1965, facilitated large-scale power developments on the North Shore, in Northern Quebec and in Labrador.

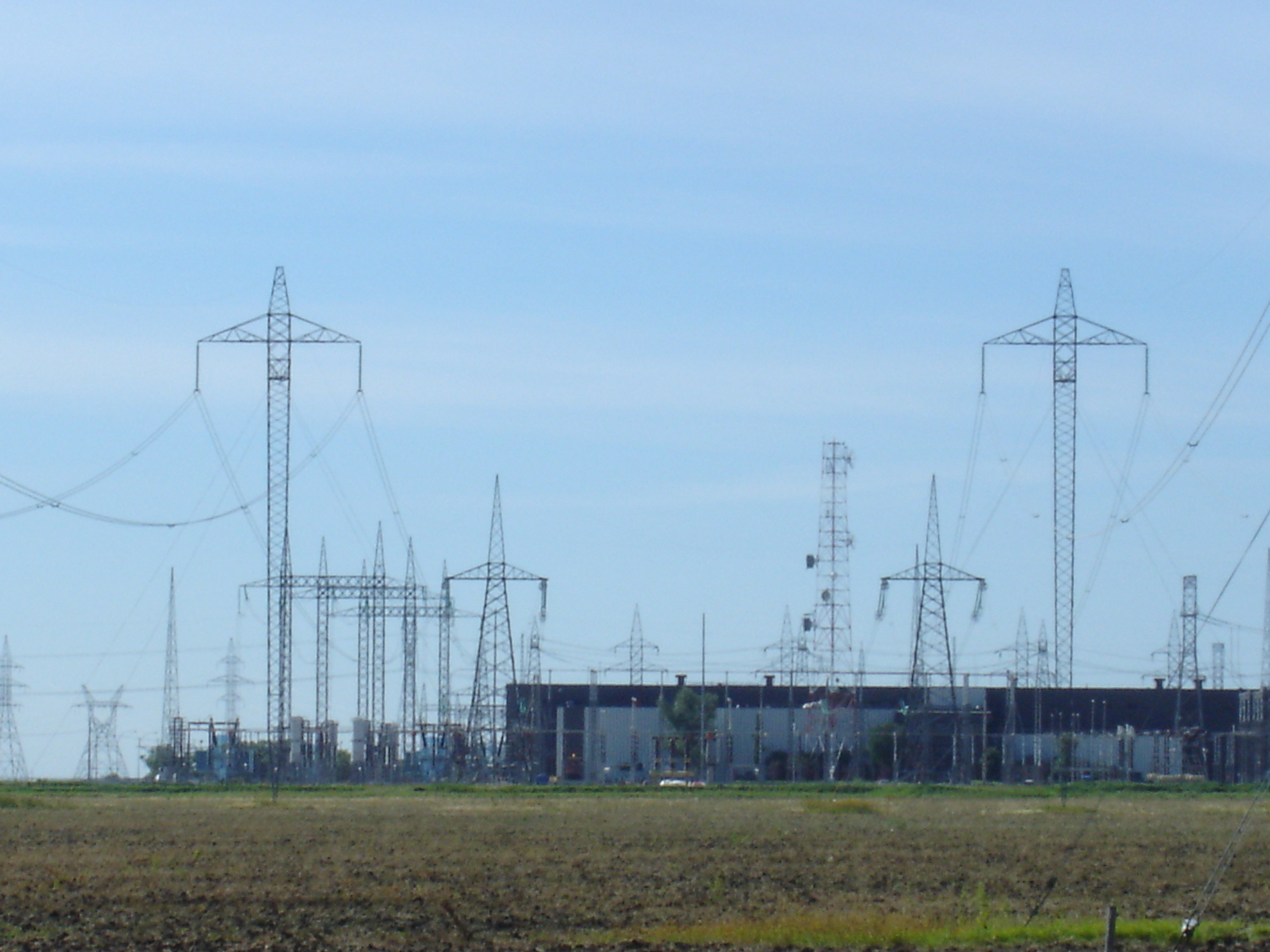
A terminus of the Nelson River HVDC system, now included on the List of IEEE milestones.

The Canadian transmission networks extend over 160,000 km (99,000 mi). The grids generally follow north-south orientations since most population centers in Canada are concentrated in southern regions along the American border while the largest hydroelectric stations are located in sparsely inhabited areas to the north. This particular situation forced Canadian utilities to innovate. In November 1965, Hydro-Québec commissioned the first 735 kV AC power line linking the Manic-Outardes project to the Lévis substation. In 1972, Manitoba Hydro connected generating stations part of the Nelson River Hydroelectric Project to the Winnipeg area through a high-voltage direct current power line, the Nelson River Bipole.

The Canadian transmission networks are largely integrated to the US power grid. There is greater integration and trade with the US than there is between Canada's provinces. The transmission utilities of provinces sharing a border with the United States are taking part in regional reliability organizations such as the North American Electric Reliability Corporation (NERC); the Maritime provinces, Quebec and Ontario are part of the Northeast Power Coordinating Council (NPCC) with utilities in New England and in New York State, Manitoba participates in the Midwest Reliability Organization (MRO), while Alberta and British Columbia are linked to the Western Electricity Coordinating Council (WECC).

Utilities across Canada are making large investments in the maintenance of ageing infrastructure and in the construction of new power lines and substations to connect new generation sources to the bulk power system. For instance, in 2009 Ontario spent $2.3 billion on a series of transmission projects aimed at connecting new renewable capacity fostered by the Green Energy Act. In Alberta, the AESO recommended in 2008 the construction of a $1.83 billion, 240 kV looped system in the southern part of the province to integrate up to 2,700 MW of new wind generation. In Quebec, Hydro-Québec TransÉnergie filed a $1.47 billion investment plan to connect 2,000 MW of new wind generation scheduled to come on-stream between 2011 and 2015.

== Rates ==
Retail prices of electricity in large Canadian cities Prices (in cents/kWh) as of April 1, 2020 (excluding taxes)
City (Utility)	Residential (Note: Monthly usage: 1,000 kWh)	Small power (Note: Power demand: 40 kW; Consumption 10,000 kWh, load factor: 35%.)	Medium power (Note: Power demand: 1,000 kW; Consumption: 400,000 kWh, load factor: 56 %.)	Large power (Note: Power demand: 50,000 kW; Consumption: 30,600,000 kWh, load factor: 85%.)
St. John's (Newfoundland Power/NL Hydro)	13.60	12.59	10.12	6.40
Charlottetown (Maritime Electric)	16.83	17.54	14.91	9.51
Halifax (Nova Scotia Power)	16.89	15.82	13.26	10.72
Moncton (NB Power)	13.42	13.88	12.23	7.76
Montreal (Hydro-Québec)	7.30	10.02	8.06	4.92
Ottawa (Hydro Ottawa)	10.29	10.15	17.59	10.91
Toronto (Toronto Hydro)	11.10	11.00	18.10	11.26
Winnipeg (Manitoba Hydro)	9.60	9.21	7.26	4.72
Regina (SaskPower)	16.51	13.98	12.01	7.56
Edmonton (EPCOR)	14.29	13.61	13.59	8.91
Calgary (ENMAX)	14.83	13.50	11.11	9.70
Vancouver (BC Hydro)	11.51	11.81	9.06	6.53

Notes

As of February 2020, the average residential cost of electricity in Canada was $0.174/kWh, and $0.135/kWh if excluding the territories, based on a monthly usage of 1,000 kWh.

== Provinces ==
=== Alberta ===
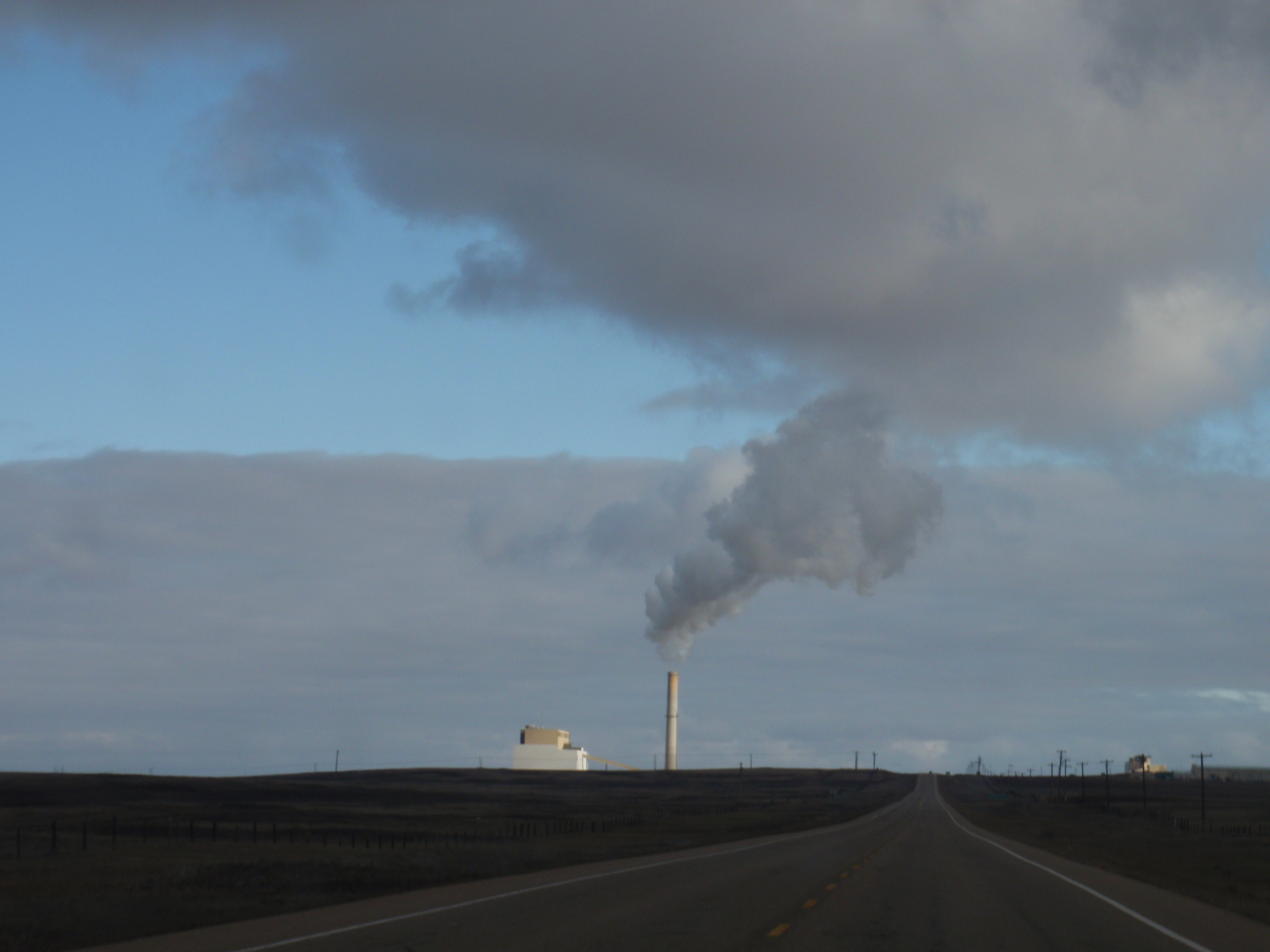
The Sheerness Generating Station, near Hanna. Commissioned in 1986, the 760-MW natural gas-fired power plant is a joint venture between ATCO and TransAlta.

Alberta was the first Canadian province to implement a deregulated electricity market. The market was established in 1996, following the adoption of the Electric Utility Act, the year before. Local distribution utilities, either investor- or municipally owned, retained the obligation to supply and the 6 largest utilities were assigned a share of the output of existing generators at a fixed price. The province moved to full retail access in 2001 and a spot market, under the Alberta Electric System Operator, was established in 2003. After consumers complained about high prices in 2000, the government implemented a Regulated Rate Option (RRO), as a means to shield consumers from price volatility.

The generation sector in Alberta is dominated by TransAlta, ENMAX, and Capital Power Corporation, a spin-off of Edmonton's municipally owned company EPCOR. Although 5,700 MW of new generation was added and 1,470 of old plants were retired between 1998 and 2009, coal still accounted for 73.8% of utility-generated power in 2007, followed by natural gas, with 20.6%.

As of 2025, installed capacity has reached 23,164 MW, with the two largest energy sources being natural gas cogeneration at 26% and wind at 25%. Despite tougher new emission measures announced by the federal government in June 2010, industry officials believed the province would continue using coal to generate electricity into 2050. In November 2015, the government announced a coal phase-out by 2030. In June 2024, coal was completely phased out of Alberta's electrical grid.

=== British Columbia ===
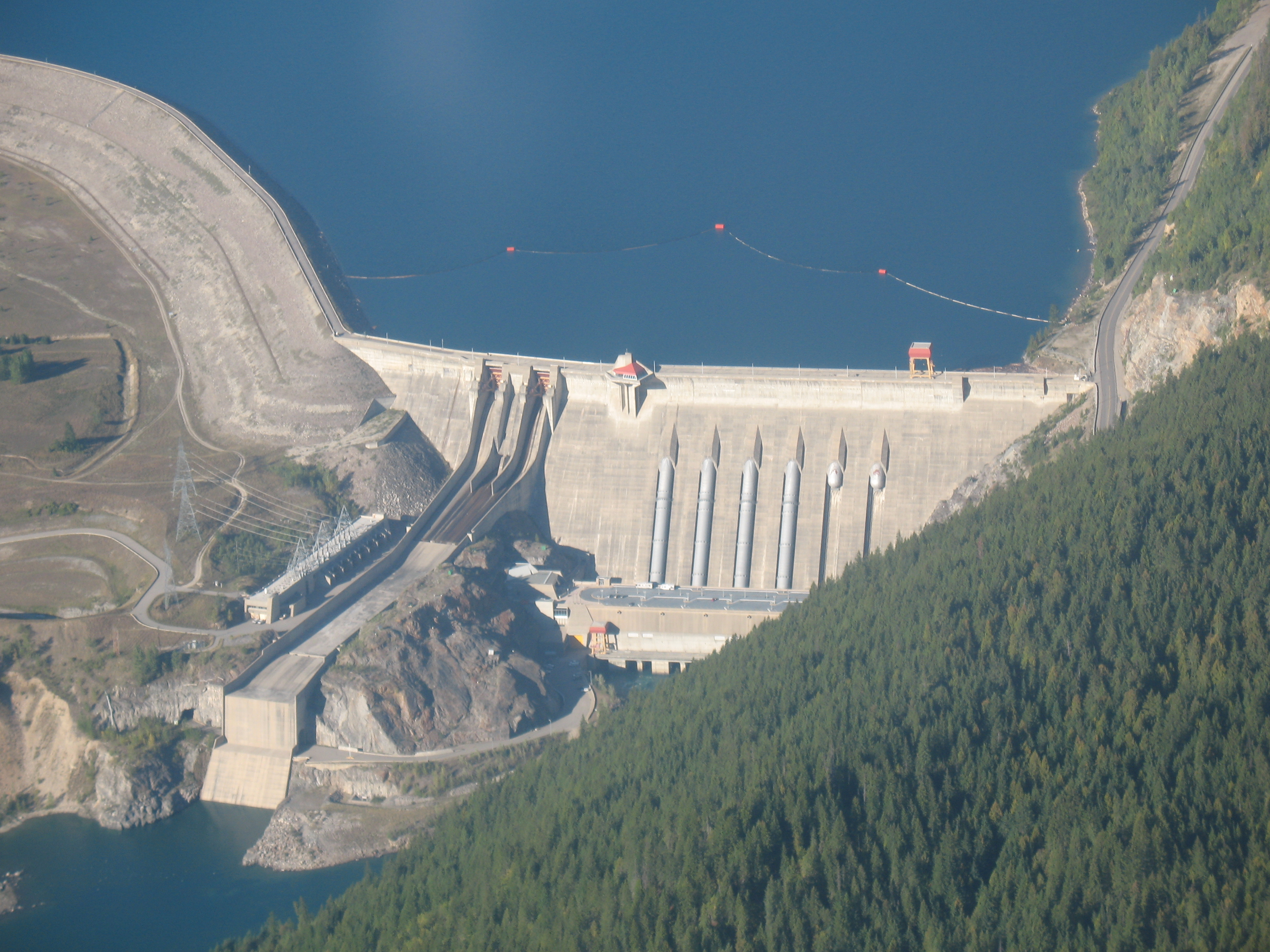
BC Hydro's Revelstoke Dam (1984).

BC Hydro was created in 1961 when the government of British Columbia, under Premier W. A. C. Bennett, passed the BC Hydro Act. This act led to the amalgamation of BC Electric Company and the BC Power Commission, and the creation of the British Columbia Hydro and Power Authority (BCHPA). BC Hydro is the main electric distributor, serving 1.8 million customers in most areas, with the exception of the Kootenay region, where FortisBC, a subsidiary of Fortis Inc. directly provides electric service to 111,000 customers and supplies municipally owned utilities in the same area.

Between 1960 and 1984, BC Hydro completed six large hydro-electric generating projects, including the 2,730 MW W. A. C. Bennett Dam and Gordon M. Shrum Generating Station and Peace Canyon on the Peace River, Mica and Revelstoke on the Columbia River, Kootenay Canal on the Kootenay River and Seven Mile Dam, on the Pend d'Oreille River.

A third dam and 900 MW generating station on the Peace River, the Site C dam near Fort St. John, has been discussed for decades and was rejected in the early 1990s. In April 2010, the British Columbia government announced moving the project to a regulatory review phase. A notice of Site C construction commencing in 2015 was issued July 2015. Revelstoke Dam built in 1984 was the last new dam built by BC Hydro.

The province's Liberal government has promoted the construction of a slew of small-scale hydro projects by private businesses. As of April 2010, 63 long-term power purchase agreements have been signed with independent power producers for 2,629 MW of capacity and 10.3 TWh of energy.

In 2015 Hydropower made up 87% of total generation, the rest being biomass, wind and some natural gas.

BC Hydro via Powerex trades electricity eastward with Alberta and south to all of the western US through the Pacific-Intertie. In 2014 BC had the largest volume of electricity imports in Canada (9700 Mwh), from the Western Interconnection in the US which is 60% fossil fueled. BC Hydro typically imports power during off-peak hours when thermal plants in the US and Alberta have excess power for sale, then exports hydropower during peak hours when prices are higher.

=== Manitoba ===
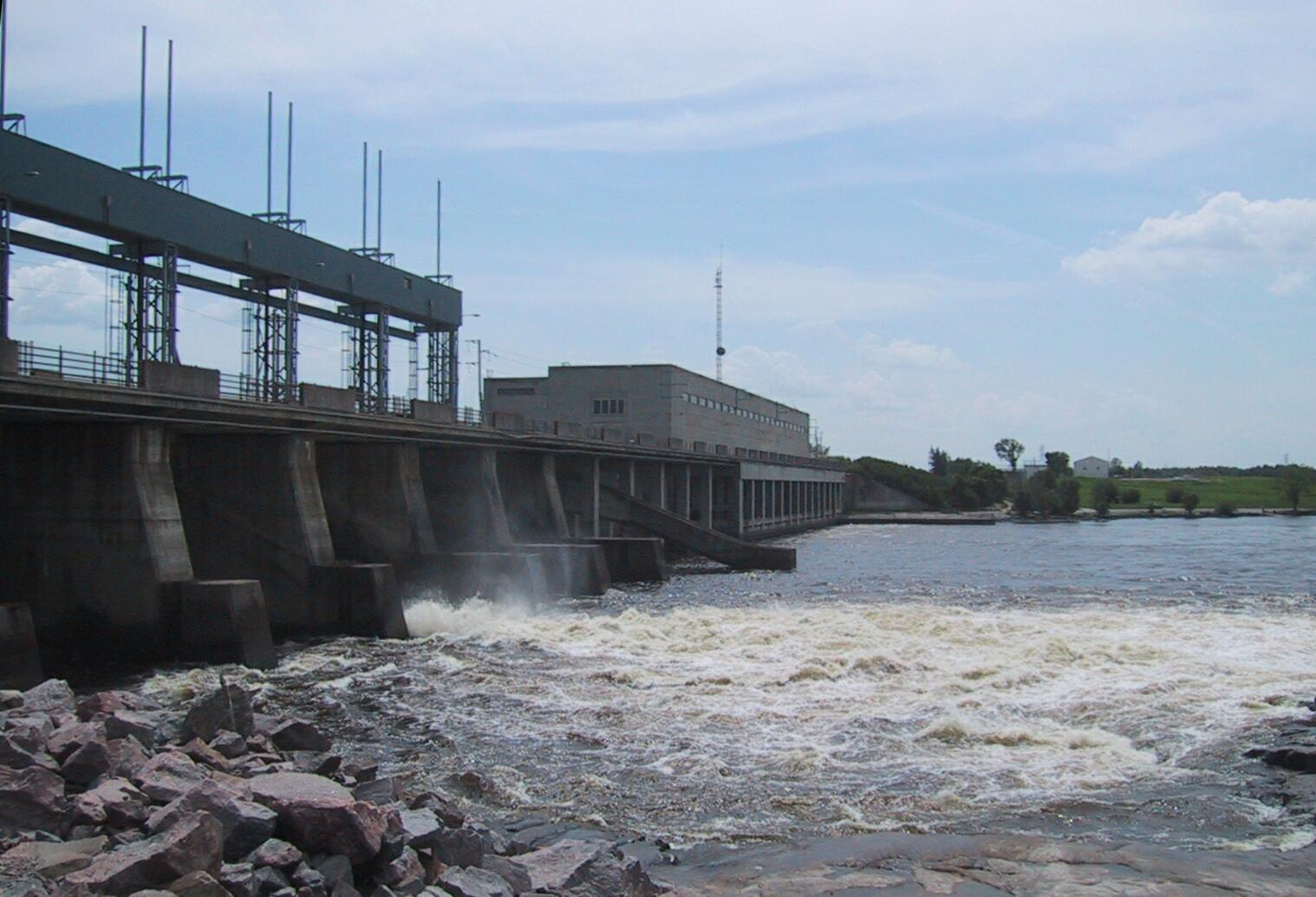
The Pine Falls Generating Station on the Winnipeg River

Manitoba Hydro is the crown corporation in charge of electricity generation, transmission and distribution in Manitoba. Its installed capacity stands, as of 2015, at 5,701 MW, mostly generated at 15 hydroelectricity generation stations on the Nelson, Saskatchewan, Laurie and the Winnipeg Rivers.

The company has completed the 200 MW Wuskwatim hydroelectric project in partnership with the Nisichawayasihk Cree Nation, with first power from the project in June 2012. By advancing the completion date of the project by 3 years, Manitoba Hydro hopes to cash in on lucrative exports in the Midwestern United States. The utility is currently building a new 695 MW station at Keeyask on the Nelson River, expecting completion in 2019.

The utility has completed the construction of a third HVDC power line linking northern Manitoba and the Winnipeg area. The Bipole III project involves the construction of a 1,364 km power line and two new converter stations. With Keeyask under construction, Manitoba Hydro has also undertaken studies of one more large hydroelectric project, the Conawapa generation station.

=== New Brunswick ===
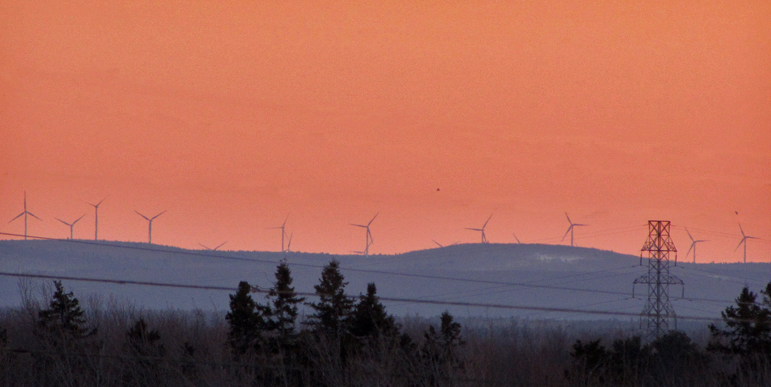
TransAlta's Kent Hills Wind Farm (2008), near Moncton. Renewable energy advocates believe New Brunswick can bolster its investments in wind power by using a community-based approach.

New Brunswick has a diversified generation mix, featuring fossil fuel, hydroelectric and nuclear capacity. Established in 1920, the provincial utility, NB Power owned 3,297 MW of installed capacity as of March 31, 2008. Since then, the company retired 2 power plants and plans to permanently shut down the 300 MW oil-fired Dalhousie generating station.

In the last decade, the government-owned utility has faced problems with the failure of a plan to switch two of its large thermal facilities to Orimulsion, a heavy bitumen fuel produced by PDVSA, the Venezuelan government oil company, and a 2-year delay in the mid-life refit of the Point Lepreau Nuclear Generating Station.

In October 2009, the provincial government signed a memorandum of understanding with Quebec to sell most of NB Power's assets to Hydro-Québec. The controversial deal was cancelled in March 2010.

Since then, a couple of options are discussed to modernize New Brunswick electricity infrastructure, including a plan to build a 500 MW intertie with Nova Scotia and a preliminary agreement with France's Areva to evaluate the feasibility of a second nuclear generating station at the Point Lepreau site. However, the nuclear expansion plan was shelved within hours of the election of a Progressive Conservative government led by David Alward in September 2010.

=== Newfoundland and Labrador ===
Electricity is generated in Newfoundland and Labrador from 74 power stations by hydroelectric power, petroleum, and renewables such as wind, solar and biomass. Total power capacity in 2022 was 8,636 MW. Newfoundland and Labrador Hydro, a Crown corporation, has an installed generating capacity of 8034 MW and is the fourth largest of all utility companies in Canada. It owns and operates most generation in the province, the transmission grid and sells directly to large industrial customers. The company also serves remote communities not connected to the main power grids, on Newfoundland and in Labrador.

Newfoundland Power, a subsidiary of St. John's-based Fortis Inc., is a regulated distributor serving 239,000 customers, making up 85% of all electricity consumers in the province. The company owns a number of hydroelectric generating assets and buys 90% of its energy from Newfoundland and Labrador Hydro.

Newfoundland and Labrador mainly relies on hydropower for its generation needs, supplemented by the 490 MW Holyrood Thermal Generating Station, near St. John's. The province's main power station, the 5,428 MW Churchill Falls Generating Station, was commissioned between 1971 and 1974. The generating station is owned by Churchill Falls (Labrador) Corporation Limited, a joint venture between Newfoundland and Labrador Hydro (65.8%) and Hydro-Québec (34.2%). Most of the output of the plant is sold at a fixed price to the Quebec utility under a power purchase agreement due to expire in 2025.

The Lower Churchill Project is a planned hydroelectric project in Labrador, to develop the remaining 35 per cent of the Churchill River that has not already been developed by the Churchill Falls Generating Station. The Lower Churchill's two installations at Gull Island and Muskrat Falls will have a combined capacity of over 3,074 MW and have the ability to provide 16.7 TWh of electricity per year. The Muskrat Falls Generation Facility consists of a dam, a spillway, and a powerhouse with four Kaplan turbines and a total generating capacity of 824 MW. Construction of the Muskrat Falls Generation Facility began in 2013 and was complete in 2022.

=== Nova Scotia ===
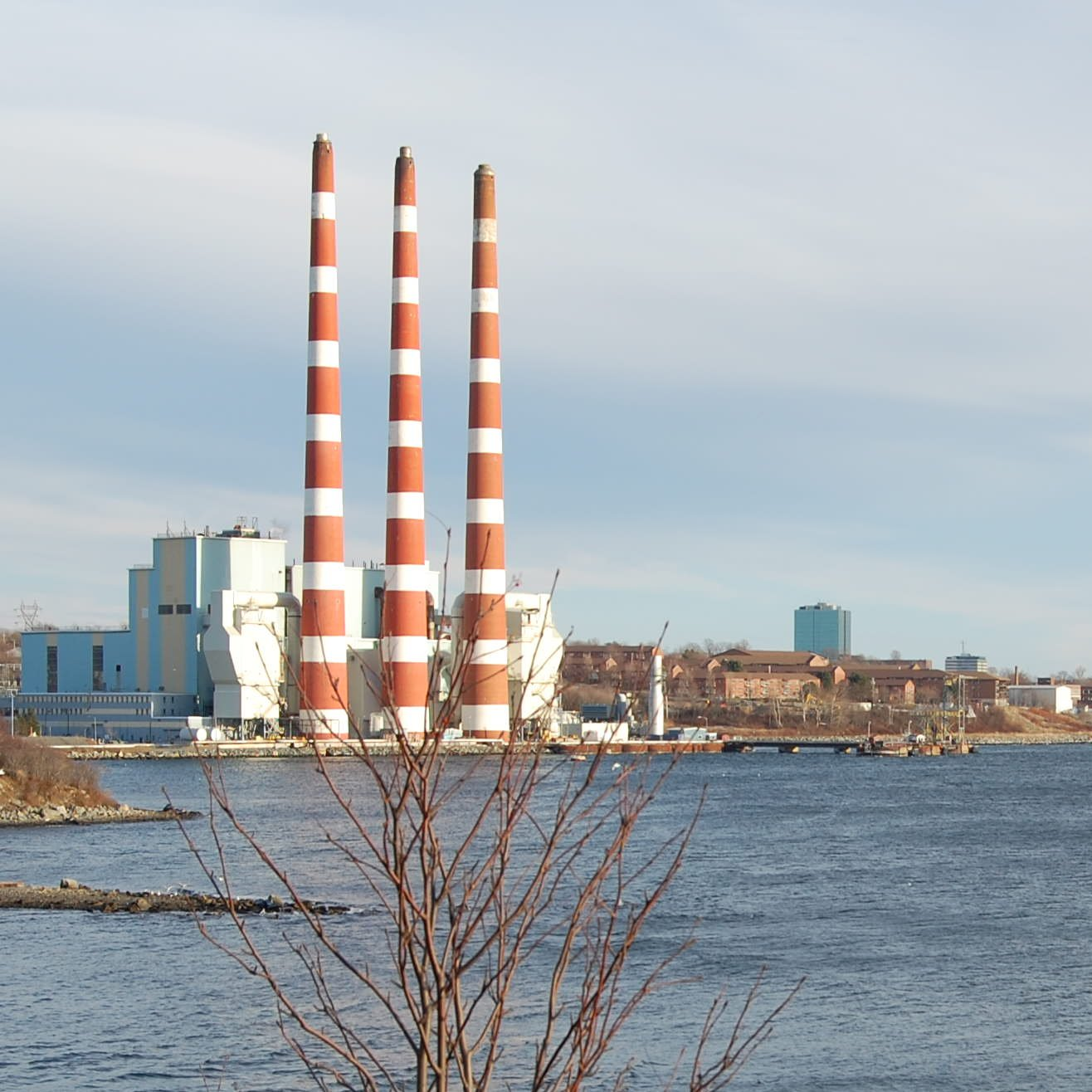
NS Power's 500-MW Tufts Cove Generating Station, in Dartmouth, near Halifax.

Nova Scotia Power Inc. (NSPI), a subsidiary of Halifax-based Emera, is the public utility in charge of the generation, transmission and distribution of electricity in Nova Scotia. Formerly a government-owned company, it was privatized in 1992 by the conservative government of premier Donald Cameron, in what was called at the time the biggest initial public offering (IPO) in Canadian history. From the $816 million proceeds, "$616 million was used to recapitalize Nova Scotia Power by paying down debt owed by the utility".

NS Power has a generating capacity of 2,293 MW: 5 thermal plants fired with a mix of coal, petroleum coke, fuel oil and natural gas, provide the bulk of the 13 TWh yearly supply. The company also operated the former Annapolis Royal Tidal Generating Station, the only one of its kind in North America. In addition it operates 33 hydroelectric generating stations, most of them small ones, with the exception of the 230 MW Wreck Cove Generating Station, inaugurated in 1978.

Over the years, NS Power has been blamed by Nova Scotia residents for its poor maintenance record and its failure to quickly reconnect customers after storms. In September 2003, 700,000 Nova Scotia residents were without power for up to two weeks after the passage of Hurricane Juan. The Category 2 storm damaged 27 main transmission lines, several transmission towers, 117 distribution feeders, and 31 major electrical substations. More recently, the issue of the company's investment in the provincial grid has been raised at a leaders' debate during the 2009 election campaign. The company received praise from premier Darrell Dexter for its efforts in restoring power after the passage of Hurricane Earl in September 2010.

In addition to the larger, centralized corporations, a number of Nova Scotian towns operate their own utilities. Riverport operates a small utility cooperative, and Lunenburg, Mahone Bay, Antigonish, Berwick and Canso all have their own public utility electrical distributors.

=== Ontario ===
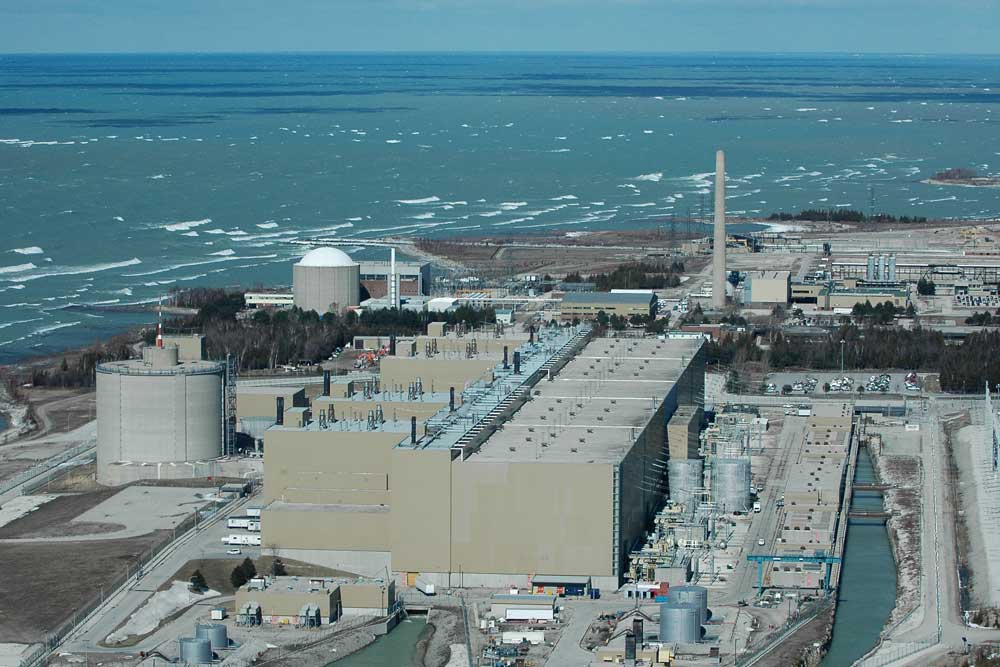
The Bruce Nuclear Generating Station near Kincardine, is the world's largest nuclear station with an installed capacity of 7,276 MW (gross).

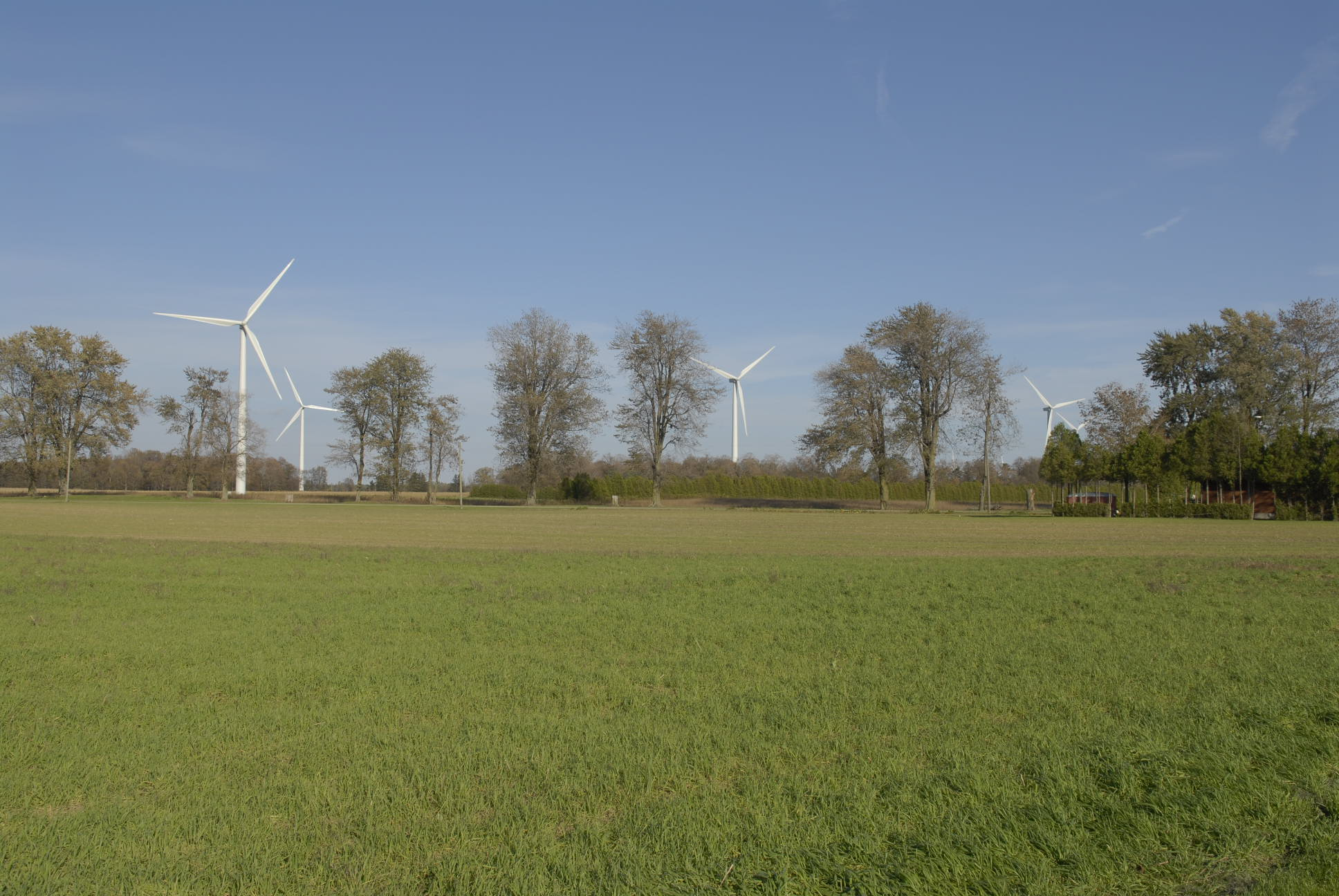
The Erie Shores Wind Farm, near Port Burwell.

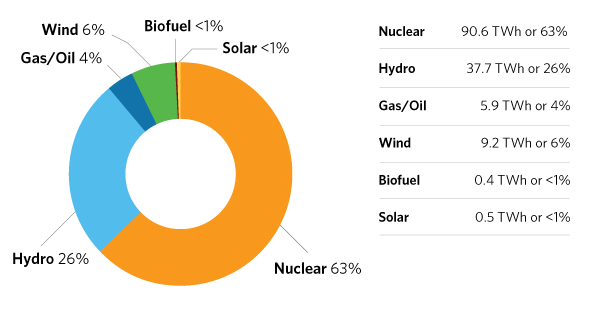
Ontario electricity generation mix (totaling 132.1 TWh) in 2017.

Electricity is generated in Ontario from nuclear power, hydroelectric power, natural gas and renewables such as wind, solar and biomass. Total production in 2017 was 132.1 TWh (i.e. 132.1 billion kWh.) The various sources of generation used in 2017 are shown in the pie chart to the right. In April 2014, Ontario eliminated coal as a source of electricity generation. The generation mix for the current hour can be viewed at the Independent Electricity System Operator (IESO) webpage.

As noted above, total electricity production in Ontario 2017 was 132.1 TWh. Adding imports of 6.6 TWh and subtracting exports of 19.1 TWh leaves 119.6 TWh usage within Ontario. With an estimated 2017 population of 14,193,384, electricity usage per person in Ontario in 2017 was 9,307 kWh per year, or about 60% of the Canadian average shown in the table Electricity per person and by power source displayed earlier in this article. (Note that this number includes all use—commercial, industrial and institutional use as well as household use—and it is at the point of production, i.e. before subtracting transmission and distribution losses.) Usage per person in Ontario may be lower than the national average because natural gas is more widely available and has a significant cost advantage for heating.

Ontario has been considered a summer peaking grid since 2000, however due to particularly cold winter temperatures and moderate summer temperatures, Ontario was winter peaking in 2014. In its 18-Month Outlook issued September 2014, the Independent Electricity System Operator (IESO) predicts a winter 2014–2015 peak of 22,149 MW under a normal weather scenario, and a summer 2015 peak of 22,808 MW, also under a normal weather scenario. The all-time record for Ontario demand was set on August 1, 2006, when peak demand for electricity reached 27,005 megawatts. (See 2006 North American heat wave.)

Overall, Ontario is a net exporter of electricity. Ontario imports electricity, primarily from its neighbouring provinces of Quebec and Manitoba (both of which are primarily hydroelectric systems), and exports electricity, primarily to Michigan and New York State, which rely heavily on fossil fuels—coal in the case of Michigan, and natural gas in the case of New York.

In 2017, Ontario's gross exports were 19.1 TWh, i.e. roughly equal to half its hydro generation of 37.7 TWh in 2017. (Although Canada is the world's third-largest producer of natural gas, Ontario imports natural gas from the United States and from western Canada.) If all the carbon emissions associated with natural gas-fueled generation were allocated to the exports, almost all the electricity consumed within Ontario would be from non-carbon or carbon neutral sources. (Note however that the natural gas generation is not necessarily coincident with exports and natural gas plants sometimes need to be operated due to regional transmission constraints, and as backup for wind generation which is intermittent and somewhat unpredictable.)

Ontario embraced nuclear power in the 1970s and 1980s, building 3 major nuclear facilities and 18 CANDU reactors, which in 2013 provided 59% of the province's electricity production, or kilowatt-hours equal to 65% of the electricity consumed within the province. The completion of the Darlington Nuclear Generating Station in 1993, "at a cost several times the original estimates", caused huge rate increases and a reassessment of Ontario's electricity policy. Three major policy documents, the Advisory Committee on Competition in Ontario's Electricity System (1996), chaired by former federal minister Donald Macdonald, a government White Paper on electricity policy (1997) and the Market Design Committee report (1999) paved the way for a major overhaul of the industry.

In April 1999, Ontario Hydro was split into five successor companies: Ontario Power Generation (OPG), in charge of generation; Hydro One, a transmission and distribution utility; the Independent Market Operator, responsible for the operation of a deregulated wholesale electric market in the province; the Electrical Safety Authority and the Ontario Electricity Financial Corporation, in charge of the $38.1 billion stranded debt, derivatives and other liabilities of the former integrated public utility.

In 2001, OPG leased Canada's largest power plant, the Bruce Nuclear Generating Station to Bruce Power, a private consortium originally led by British Energy, reducing its share of the provincial generation market to 70%. The government opened the competitive market on May 1, 2002, but heat waves and droughts in the summer of 2002 caused wholesale prices to soar to peaks of $4.71/kWh in July and $10.28/kWh in September. Faced with bitter complaints from consumers, the Ernie Eves government announced a price freeze for small customers while leaving the wholesale market intact, on November 11, 2002.

Although Eves was praised for the pause in generation market deregulation the cancellation of Hydro One's initial public offering and his handling of the 2003 North American blackout, the Progressive Conservatives were defeated by Dalton McGuinty's Liberals in the provincial election of 2003. In the meantime, the phasing out of coal-fired generation — including North America's largest coal plant, the 3,640 MW Nanticoke Generating Station — became a political issue. In 2002, the Conservatives promised to shut down Ontario's 5 coal plants by 2015, while McGuinty committed to a 2007 retirement date, which was pushed back to 2014.

In April 2009, the Ontario legislature passed the Green Energy Act establishing feed-in tariffs for power from renewable sources and streamlining the approval process for new generation sites. Two months after passing the bill, Ontario announced the suspension of a competitive process for the purchase of 2 new nuclear reactors at Darlington, citing the price tag, later evaluated at $26 billion. Critics of the government strategy stress the Act will increase the price of electricity and undermine the system's reliability, while pitting some local residents against wind developers.

The impact of the Act has been notable in terms of the price impact on end consumers. Since 2009, electricity prices have risen by 95% for homeowners and by 115% for small businesses in the province of Ontario.

As of June 2018, Ontario's wind capacity stood at 4,412 MW. As of 2010, Ontario's wind capacity represented more than a third of Canada's total. Canada's largest grid battery at 1.8 GWh is under construction near Edwardsburgh/Cardinal, scheduled for 2027.

=== Prince Edward Island ===
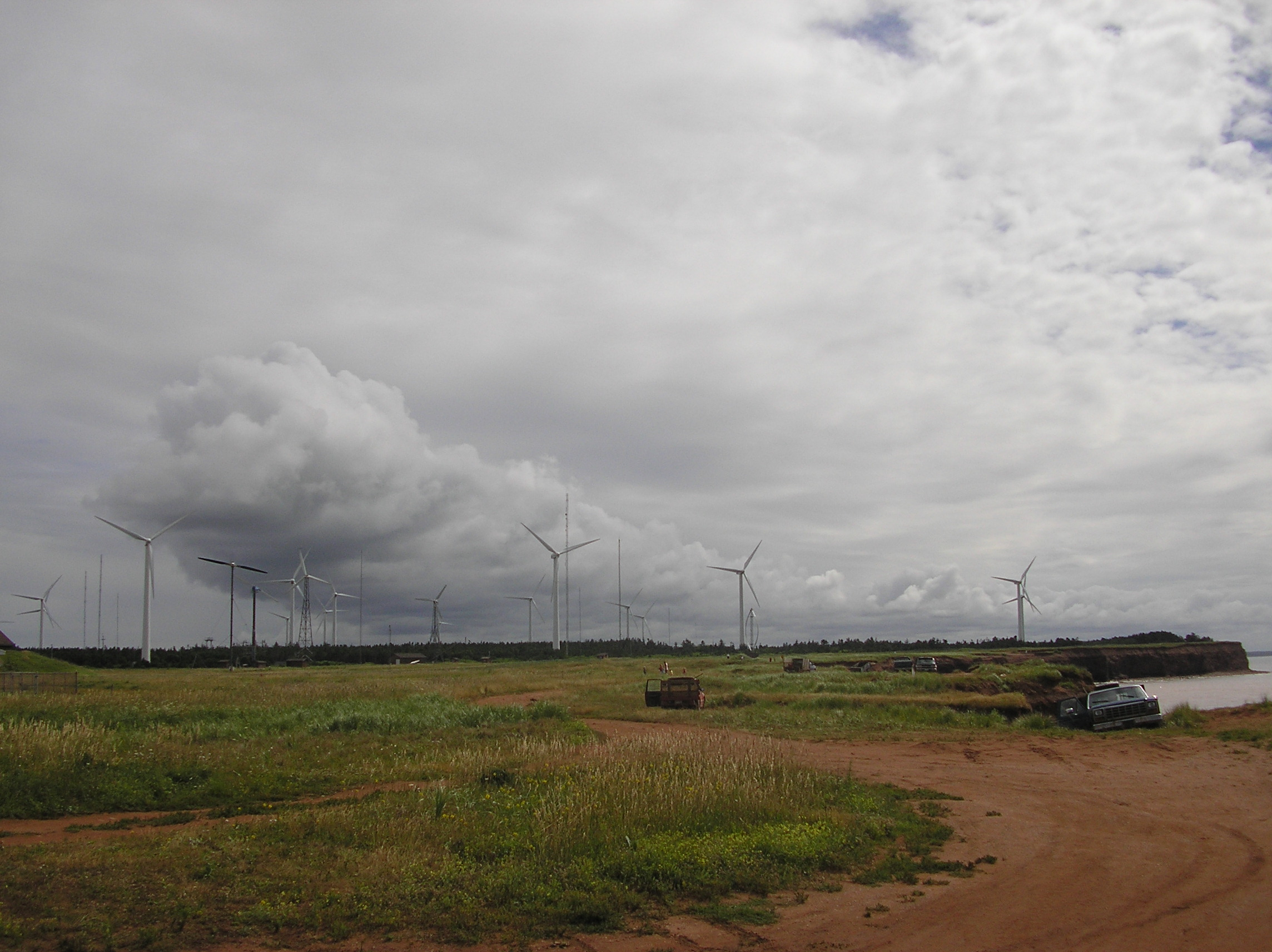
The North Cape wind farm.

Prince Edward Island is the only Canadian province without a hydroelectric power station. The province is largely dependent on imported power from NB Power generation facilities in New Brunswick. Two submarine power lines provide more than 80% of the provincial load. Since the early 2000, the provincial government has promoted the province as a good place to set up wind farms.

Maritime Electric, a subsidiary of St. John's-based Fortis Inc., operates the integrated public utility serving most of the province, with the exception of the city of Summerside, which has been providing electric service to its residents since 1920. Both utilities own and operate diesel plants, used as peakers or during emergencies.

Electricity rates in Charlottetown are the highest of the 12 large Canadian cities surveyed by Hydro-Québec in its annual compendium of North American electricity rates. According to the document, a residential customer using 1,000 kWh per month would pay 17.29 cents/kWh, a rate two and a half times higher than the one paid by consumers in Montreal, Winnipeg or Vancouver.

In November 2009, Premier Robert Ghiz hoped to reduce the price of electricity while limiting atmospheric emissions by opening talks with the government of Quebec for a long-term supply agreement. Negotiations, with Hydro-Québec, and other suppliers, including current supplier NB Power, are ongoing.

=== Quebec ===
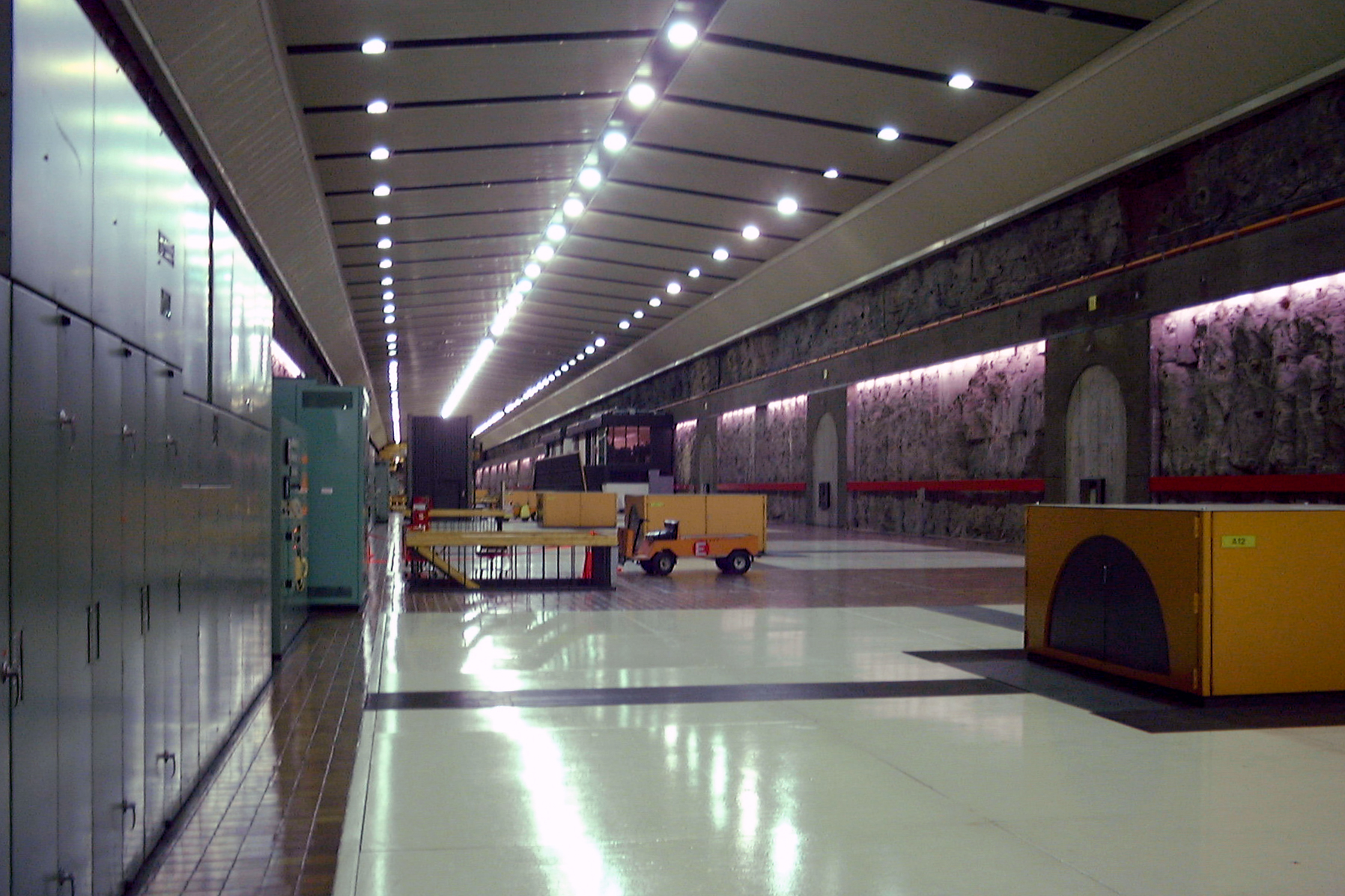
The underground Robert-Bourassa generating station is Canada's largest hydroelectric plant. The 16-unit plant has an installed capacity of 5,616-MW.

The Quebec electricity sector is dominated by Canada's largest utility, government-owned Hydro-Québec. With an installed capacity of 36,810 MW, including 34,118 MW of hydropower, the utility generated and bought 203.2 TWh in 2009, almost one-third of all electricity generated in Canada. Benefiting from low generation costs, favorable interest rates and high export prices, Hydro-Québec paid $10 billion in dividends to the Quebec government between 2005 and 2009.

Since 2003, the company commissioned 8 new hydroelectric generating stations for a total of 2,343 MW and is currently building 6 new power plants: Eastmain-1-A (768 MW) and Sarcelle (150 MW) scheduled for 2012, and 4 generating stations on the Romaine River (1,550 MW) to be commissioned between 2014 and 2020. Hydro-Québec's latest strategic plan, released in 2009, outline a further 3,500 MW of new generation capacity, including 3,000 MW of additional hydro projects, to be built by 2035. The company's total investments in generation, transmission, distribution and energy efficiency for the 2009–2013 timeframe are expected to reach $25.1 billion.

Quebec also intends to increase its wind generation capacity. The government's 2006 energy strategy calls for the construction of 3,500 MW by 2015. Two calls for tenders initiated in 2003 and 2005 resulted in the signing of 22 20-year power purchase agreements between Hydro-Québec and independent power producers, for a total capacity of 2,990 MW. A third one, geared at small-scale community- or First Nations-led projects, is expected to be completed by the end of 2010. The province got 99% of its electricity from renewable sources in 2013.

=== Saskatchewan ===
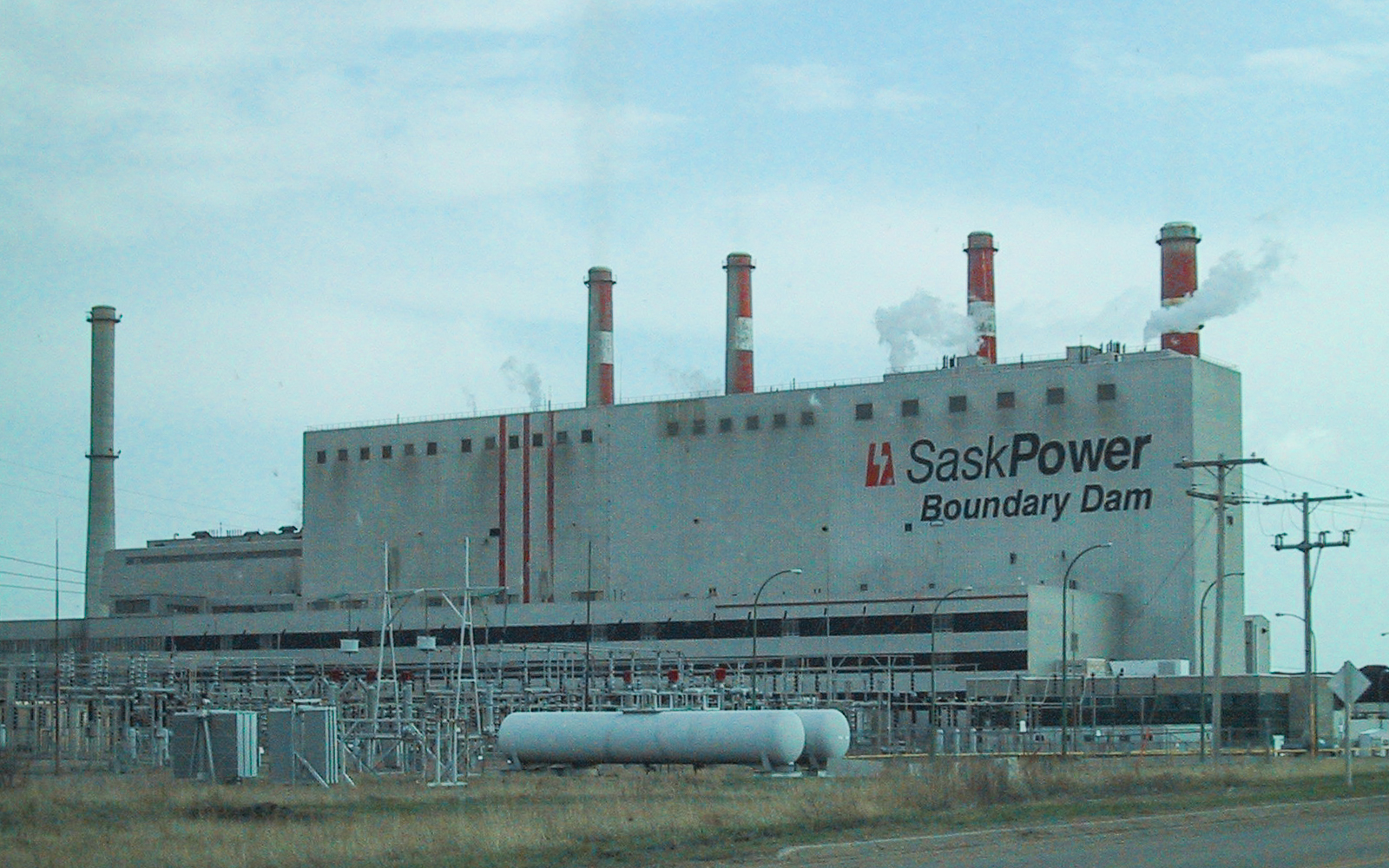
Boundary Dam Coal Fired Generating Station in Estevan

In 2007, Saskatchewan produced 12,362 GWh of electricity through its coal-fired power plants, on a total generation of 20,278 GWh. SaskPower, the government-owned public utility is the main power generator in the province. The company has a generating capacity of 3,371 MW and 17 generating facilities. These include three coal-fired baseload facilities (1682 MW), five natural gas-fired plants (674 MW), seven hydroelectric developments (854 MW), and two wind farms (161 MW). Two independent power producers, the Cory and Meridian cogeneration stations have a combined capacity of 438 MW, while 5 waste heat facilities have a maximum output of 31 MW.

The current state of the electric system will require heavy investments in the next decade. Discussion have been undertaken with Manitoba about building a 138 kV interconnection between the two neighbouring provinces. A new privately owned natural gas-fired combined-cycle generation turbine in North Battleford is under construction. The 260 MW facility is expected to be completed in 2013.

=== Yukon ===
Yukon Energy Corporation is the crown corporation that generates most of the power consumed in Yukon. Hydro is the main generation source, with a 93.2% share in 2007. It is supplemented by a wind turbine in Whitehorse and diesel generators in remote communities. Yukon has two separate grids. Neither are connected to the continental power grid. Yukon Electrical Company is the main distributor in Yukon.

In its Energy Strategy, released in 2009, the Yukon government has stated it wants to increase the supply of renewable energy, hydro and wind, by 20%. The government is also considering linking Yukon's two main power grids by completing the Carmacks to Stewart transmission line. No timetable has been set.

=== Northwest Territories ===
Although the Northwest Territories are not connected to the North American power grid, there are two electric networks operating in the territory, the first one in the Yellowknife area and the other in Fort Smith. In most communities, loads are served by local diesel generators.

The government-owned Northwest Territories Power Corporation is in charge of power generation, while Northland Utilities, a subsidiary of ATCO, operate the distribution networks.

=== Nunavut ===
Qulliq Energy, a government-owned corporation, is the only power generator serving Nunavut. Qulliq has a total of 25 diesel generators, serving 25 communities. The territory is not connected to the North American power grid.

Qulliq Energy plans to build a small hydroelectric project at Jaynes Inlet, not far from the territorial capital, Iqaluit, which is currently served by two diesel generators. The 5 MW generating station, which could cost upwards of $200 million, was delayed by lower oil prices and the 2008 financial crisis.

== Climate change ==
In 2013, electricity generation was responsible for 105 Mt of carbon dioxide emissions, 20% of the nation's total, second only to transport at 32%. This represents an 18% reduction since 2005.

While Canada reduces the carbon footprint in the US by exporting 10% of total hydroelectricity, more than half of all Canadian homes and businesses burn natural gas for heat. Hydro power, nuclear power and wind generate 80% of Canada's electricity, coal and natural gas are burned for the remaining 20%.

As of 2008, Alberta's electricity sector was the most carbon-intensive of all Canadian provinces and territories, with total emissions of 55.9 million tonnes of CO_{2} equivalent in 2008, accounting for 47% of all Canadian emissions in the electricity and heat generation sector. It is followed by Ontario (27.4 Mt CO_{2} eq.), Saskatchewan (15.4 Mt CO_{2} eq.) and Nova Scotia (9.4 Mt CO_{2} eq.). Of all provinces, Quebec has the lowest carbon intensity in the electricity sector with 2.45 g of CO_{2} eq. per kWh of electricity generated.

Ontario registered a large drop in emissions in 2008, due to lower demand, natural gas prices and government instructions to Ontario Power Generation regarding a gradual decommissioning of coal-fired generation by 2014. According to the Independent Electricity System Operator of Ontario, 4,700 MW of new natural gas-fired generation and 1,100 MW of wind farms have been commissioned in the province between 2003 and 2009. The new natural gas capacity will allow Ontario to retire 2 units each at the Nanticoke and Lambton generating stations by the end of 2010, on track for a complete phase-out by the end of 2014.

In Alberta, TransAlta and Capital Power Corporation undertook the construction of a carbon capture and storage project at the 450 MW Keephills-3 supercritical sub-bituminous coal-fired power station. The project, which received a $770 million grant from the federal and provincial governments, involved storing the captured CO_{2} through geological sequestration and enhanced oil recovery. It was scheduled to be operational by 2015; however, the project was canceled in 2012. In March 2010, SaskPower has announced its own carbon sequestration project at the Boundary Dam Power Station, the province's largest coal plant. In British Columbia, the provincial government ordered BC Hydro to remove the 50-year-old gas-fired Burrard Generating Station from its roster of baseload plants.

Greenhouse gas emissions from Electricity and Heat Generation, 1990–2008, by province or territory
Province/Territory	1990	2004	2005	2006	2007	2008
Province/Territory	kilotonnes CO_{2} equivalent					
Newfoundland and Labrador	1,630	1,450	1,230	795	1,230	1,040
Prince Edward Island	103	18	12	8	-	-
Nova Scotia	6,840	9,990	9,360	8,680	9,140	9,420
New Brunswick	6,130	8,690	8,630	7,060	7,310	6,830
Quebec	1,520	1,660	727	918	2,180	470
Ontario	26,600	32,300	34,300	28,600	32,000	27,400
Manitoba	569	393	511	382	497	488
Saskatchewan	10,400	16,800	15,500	14,900	15,700	15,400
Alberta	40,200	53,400	52,600	53,900	55,400	55,900
British Columbia	1,180	1,870	1,480	1,540	1,460	1,520
Yukon	94	8	8	8	11	-
Northwest Territories	222	264	282	222	256	-
Nunavut	91	45	35	54	35	48
Canada	95,500	127,000	125,000	117,000	125,000	119,000

== International trade ==
Some provincial hydro companies benefited a great deal from the liberalization of the United States electricity sector brought by the Energy Policy Act of 1992 and the Federal Energy Regulatory Commission's Order 888. New Brunswick, Manitoba, Ontario and Quebec have been net exporters while BC Hydro has created an energy marketing subsidiary to actively trade on the neighbouring electricity market.

In 2009, Canada exported more than 53 TWh of electricity — approximately 9% of its output — to its southern neighbour the United States, while it imported 18 TWh. While occupying a relatively small part of the overall U.S. market, Canadian supplies constitute a significant share of the power consumed in key markets, such as New England, New York State, Ohio, Michigan, Minnesota and the Pacific Northwest.

In August 2010, Hydro-Québec signed a 26-year renewal of its 225 MW power contract with the largest Vermont public utilities, Central Vermont Public Service and Green Mountain Power. To facilitate the deal, a new renewable energy law, H.781, was signed into law by governor Jim Douglas on June 4, 2010, after passage in both houses of the Vermont Legislature. The Act makes Vermont the first U.S. state to declare large-scale hydroelectric power as "a renewable energy resource".

Transfers of Electricity between Canada and the United States, 2006–2011
Province	2011		2010		2009		2008		2007		2006	
Province	from the U.S.	to the U.S.	from the U.S.	to the U.S.	from the U.S.	to the U.S.	from the U.S.	to the U.S.	from the U.S.	to the U.S.	from the U.S.	to the U.S.
Province	GWh											
Alberta	991	41	464	253	662	216	761	228	651	247	209	67
British Columbia	9,999	9,955	10,124	5,671	11,275	6,943	11,514	8,081	7,202	10,323	12,209	5,174
Manitoba	139	9,344	296	9,070	224	9,262	88	9,880	528	11,063	819	12,312
New Brunswick	585	1,056	844	1,030	1,408	1,904	1,081	1,367	646	1,598	511	2,058
Nova Scotia	146	—	205	4	—	—	273	13	25	13	25	229
Ontario	1,764	11,066	3,601	11,208	3,328	16,180	7,998	18,571	6,908	10,365	6,353	9,059
Quebec	443	19,879	2,502	17,011	1,057	18,637	1,352	17,455	3,359	16,101	2,535	11,713
Saskatchewan	321	991	414	464	334	110	432	137	203	392	1,147	595
Canada	14,387	51,341	18,449	44,373	18,288	53,252	23,499	55,732	19,522	50,102	23,808	41,207
