= List of generating stations in Yukon =

This is a list of electrical generating stations in Yukon, Canada.

The government-owned Yukon Energy Corporation is the main power generator, while Yukon Electrical Company, a subsidiary of Alberta-based ATCO, is in charge of distribution in most areas.

Yukon Energy facilities have a total capacity of 116 MW, including four hydroelectric generating stations, a two-turbine wind farm and 19 diesel-powered generators: eight in Whitehorse, two in Mayo, six in Dawson and three in Faro. Since the commission of a high-voltage power line linking the Mayo generating station to Dawson, the diesel generators are mainly used in emergencies. The territory is not connected to the North American power grid.

== Hydroelectric ==
List of all hydroelectric generating stations in Yukon.

Name	Location	Capacity (MW)	Date	Owner	Ref
Aishihik Hydroelectric Dam	61°02′07″N 137°03′12″W	37		Yukon Energy Corporation	
Fish Lake	60°43′22″N 135°11′05″W	1.3		Yukon Electrical	
Mayo Hydroelectric Dam	63°39′24″N 135°55′04″W	15		Yukon Energy Corporation	
Whitehorse Rapids Hydroelectric Dam	60°41′38″N 135°02′25″W	40		Yukon Energy Corporation	

== Wind ==
List of all wind farms in Yukon.

Name	Location	Capacity (MW)	Date	Owner	Ref
Haeckel Hill	60°44′51″N 135°13′34″W	0.81		Yukon Energy Corporation	

== See also ==
- Energy in Canada
- List of electrical generating stations in Canada
