= List of generating stations in the Northwest Territories =

This is a list of electrical generating stations in the Northwest Territories, Canada.

Although the territory is not connected to the North American power grid, there are two electric networks operating in the territory, the first one in the Yellowknife, Northwest Territories area and the other in Fort Smith. In most communities, loads are served by local diesel generators. The government-owned Northwest Territories Power Corporation is in charge of power generation.

== Hydroelectric ==
List of all hydroelectric generating stations in the Northwest Territories.

Name	Date	Capacity (MW)	Location	Owner	Type	Ref
Bluefish Hydro		7.5	Yellowknife	NTPC	Hydro	
Snare Cascades		4.3	Snare River	NTPC	Hydro	
Snare Falls		7.5	Snare River	NTPC	Hydro	
Snare Forks		9.15	Snare River	NTPC	Hydro	
Snare Rapids		8.5	Snare River	NTPC	Hydro	
Taltson Hydro		18	Fort Smith	NTPC	Hydro	

== Fossil fuel ==
List of all fossil fuel electrical generating stations in the Northwest Territories.

Name	Date	Capacity (MW)	Location	Owner	Type	Ref
Aklavik		1.28	Aklavik	NTPC	Diesel genset	
Behchokö		1.35	Behchokö	NTPC	Diesel genset	
Buffalo Junction		0.1	Buffalo Junction	NTPC	Diesel genset	
Colville Lake		0.25	Colville Lake	NTPC	Diesel genset	
Deline		1.14	Deline	NTPC	Diesel genset	
Fort Good Hope		1.23	Fort Good Hope	NTPC	Diesel genset	
Fort Liard		1.32	Fort Liard	NTPC	Diesel genset	
Fort McPherson		1.825	Fort McPherson	NTPC	Diesel genset	
Fort Resolution		0.6	Fort Resolution	NTPC	Diesel genset	
Fort Simpson		3.21	Fort Simpson	NTPC	Diesel genset	
Fort Smith		6	Fort Smith	NTPC	Diesel genset	
Gameti		0.61	Gameti	NTPC	Diesel genset	
Inuvik (Gas)		7.7	Inuvik (Gas)	NTPC	Natural gas	
Inuvik (Diesel)		6.06	Inuvik (Diesel)	NTPC	Diesel genset	
Jean Marie River		0.23	Jean Marie River	NTPC	Diesel genset	
Lutsel K'e		0.82	Lutsel K'e	NTPC	Diesel genset	
Nahanni Butte		0.245	Nahanni Butte	NTPC	Diesel genset	
Norman Wells		2.12	Norman Wells	NTPC	Diesel genset	
Paulatuk		0.84	Paulatuk	NTPC	Diesel genset	
Sachs Harbour		0.795	Sachs Harbour	NTPC	Diesel genset	
Taltson Diesel		0.3	Fort Smith	NTPC	Diesel genset	
Tsiigehtchic		0.5	Tsiigehtchic	NTPC	Diesel genset	
Tuktoyaktuk		2.505	Tuktoyaktuk	NTPC	Diesel genset	
Tulita		1.1	Tulita	NTPC	Diesel genset	
Ulukhaktok		1.16	Ulukhaktok	NTPC	Diesel genset	
Whati		0.975	Whati	NTPC	Diesel genset	
Wrigley		0.781	Wrigley	NTPC	Diesel genset	
Yellowknife (Jackfish Lake)		27.66	Yellowknife	NTPC	Combustion turbine (diesel)	

== See also ==
- Energy in Canada
- List of electrical generating stations in Canada
