= Northern Canada Power Commission =

Crown corporation

- Formerly: Northwest Territories Power Commission (1948–56)
- Type: Crown corporation
- Industry: Electric utility
- Founded: 1948
- Defunct: 1988
- Successors: Northwest Territories Power Corporation; Yukon Energy
- Headquarters: Edmonton, Alberta, Canada
- Owner: Government of Canada

The Northern Canada Power Commission, formerly the Northwest Territories Power Commission, was a federal Crown corporation established by the Government of Canada to serve as the electric utility for northern Canada. The assets of the NCPC were transferred to the territorial governments of Yukon and the Northwest Territories in the 1980s to form Yukon Energy and the Northwest Territories Power Corporation.

== See also ==
- Qulliq Energy, an electricity utility created from Northwest Territories Power Corporation during the establishment of Nunavut.
