= Qulliq Energy =

Electrical power generating corporation in Nunavut, Canada

Qulliq Energy Corporation
- Native name: ᖁᓪᓕᖅ ᐆᒻᒪᖅᑯᑎᓕᕆᔨᒃᑯᑦ ᑎᒥᖁᑖ; Qulliq Alruyaktuqtunik Ikumadjutiit; Société d’énergie Qulliq
- Formerly: Nunavut Power Corporation
- Type: Territorial corporation
- Industry: Energy company
- Founded: April 1, 2001
- Headquarters: Baker Lake, Nunavut, Canada
- Key people: Bruno Pereira (President); Simeonie Akpalialuk (Chair)
- Products: Electrical power
- Owner: Government of Nunavut
- Website: www.qec.nu.ca

Qulliq Energy Corporation (QEC; Inuktitut: ᖁᓪᓕᖅ ᐆᒻᒪᖅᑯᑎᓕᕆᔨᒃᑯᑦ ᑎᒥᖁᑖ; Inuinnaqtun: Qulliq Alruyaktuqtunik Ikumadjutiit; French: Société d’énergie Qulliq) is a Canadian territorial corporation which is the sole electricity utility and distributor in Nunavut. It is wholly owned by the Government of Nunavut.

Its name is derived from the qulliq, a traditional oil lamp used by Inuit and other Arctic indigenous peoples. It is headquartered in Baker Lake, Nunavut.

== History ==
The Nunavut Power Corporation was established by the Nunavut Power Utilities Act (now the Qulliq Energy Corporation Act) in 2001 to take over the Nunavut-based assets of the Northwest Territories Power Corporation (itself a successor to the Northern Canada Power Commission). In 2003, Nunavut Power Corporation was renamed Qulliq Energy Corporation and the mandate of the corporation was expanded to include energy conservation and alternative generation development.

Qulliq Energy established the Nunavut Energy Centre in 2006 as a division focusing on energy conservation through public outreach. The centre was closed down on March 31, 2009, and its functions were transferred to the territorial government departments.

== Operations ==
Low population, long distances between communities, severe weather, and remoteness of transportation and construction technology make a high voltage interconnected grid unviable. As a result, the utility oversees Nunavut’s system of 25 isolated microgrids—one in each community—each reliant on a dedicated diesel generator fuelled by the annual sealift re-supply during the summer shipping season.

This dependence on diesel presents its own set of environmental and economic impacts, leaving the territory vulnerable to world energy price fluctuations. The first new power generation facility since the establishment of the company was the expansion of the Iqaluit power plant.

The geography of Nunavut presents unique challenges to hydro-electric facilities, but the company is actively engaged in site reviews for hydro-electric developments in the 12-20 MW range around Iqaluit, the territorial capital. The hydro-electric plants are planned in Jaynes Inlet and Armshow South on the south shore of Frobisher Bay.

During the 1970s, there had been suggestions of NCPC employing "slowpoke" nuclear generators to produce power in the many isolated communities.

Since the establishment, periodic discussions continue regarding the possibility of combining Nunavut's fuel delivery functions under Qulliq Energy.

== Expansion ==
=== Iqaluit Nukkiksautiit Hydroelectric Project ===
In 2005, Quilliq Energy initiated a study of potential sites near Iqaluit for the development of a hydroelectric power station. Two sites, Jaynes Inlet and Armshow South, were selected as the most cost-effective and viable solutions after comprehensive research. The Jaynes Inlet site (63°15′48″N 68°15′52″W) would be the site of a 12.5 MW hydroelectric dam that is expected to meet Iqaluit's current energy demand. The Armshow South site (63°33′04″N 68°55′40″W) would be the site of a 7.3 MW hydroelectric dam that would be developed when additional capacity is needed.

The hydroelectric initiative was revived in the 2020s as the Iqaluit Nukkiksautiit Hydroelectric Project, led by the Nunavut Nukkiksautiit Corporation (NNC). The proposed facility would be a 15–30 MW hydroelectric plant on the Kuugaluk River — approximately 60 km northeast of Iqaluit — designed to fully replace the city’s diesel-generated electricity. In February 2025, the Government of Canada committed up to $6 million through the Canadian Northern Economic Development Agency to support front-end engineering and design, including field investigations, regulatory preparation, and community engagement. In August 2025, NNC and Qulliq Energy Corporation signed a memorandum of understanding establishing the commercial framework for potential future power purchases. In November 2025, the project was formally referred to the federal Major Projects Office, placing it within a coordinated review process for large-scale infrastructure projects. According to public project documents and federal briefings, a final investment decision is targeted for 2029, with construction projected to begin in 2030 and commissioning in 2033, pending regulatory approvals and full capital financing.

=== Other Renewable Energy Projects ===
In numerous communities across the Canadian north, renewable energy projects using solar panels, wind turbines, and hydroelectric power plants are being pursued. The option of extending a transmission line to Manitoba would enable hydroelectricity from Manitoba Hydro to be used in the Kivalliq region of Nunavut. Photovoltaic solar power is particularly attractive due to its absence of structural-mechanical complexity. Given the very long days of summer, in some communities the installation of such panels can enable diesel gensets to be turned off for multiple hours at a time. Additionally, Nunavut is also pursuing independent power production in the form of solar panels on schools, healthcare facilities, and municipal buildings.

In 2023, a wind turbine was installed in the community of Sanikiluaq, making it the first in the territory to generate renewable energy without reliance on diesel plants when "system conditions permit." It is expected to go online by late 2024.

== Controversies ==
In 2010 and 2011, five lawsuits were filed against Qulliq Energy by former employees for wrongful/constructive dismissal, while some other former workers accused the company for the violation of Inuit rights in the workplace.

== See also ==
- List of Canadian electric utilities
- List of generating stations in Nunavut
