= Schwatka Lake =

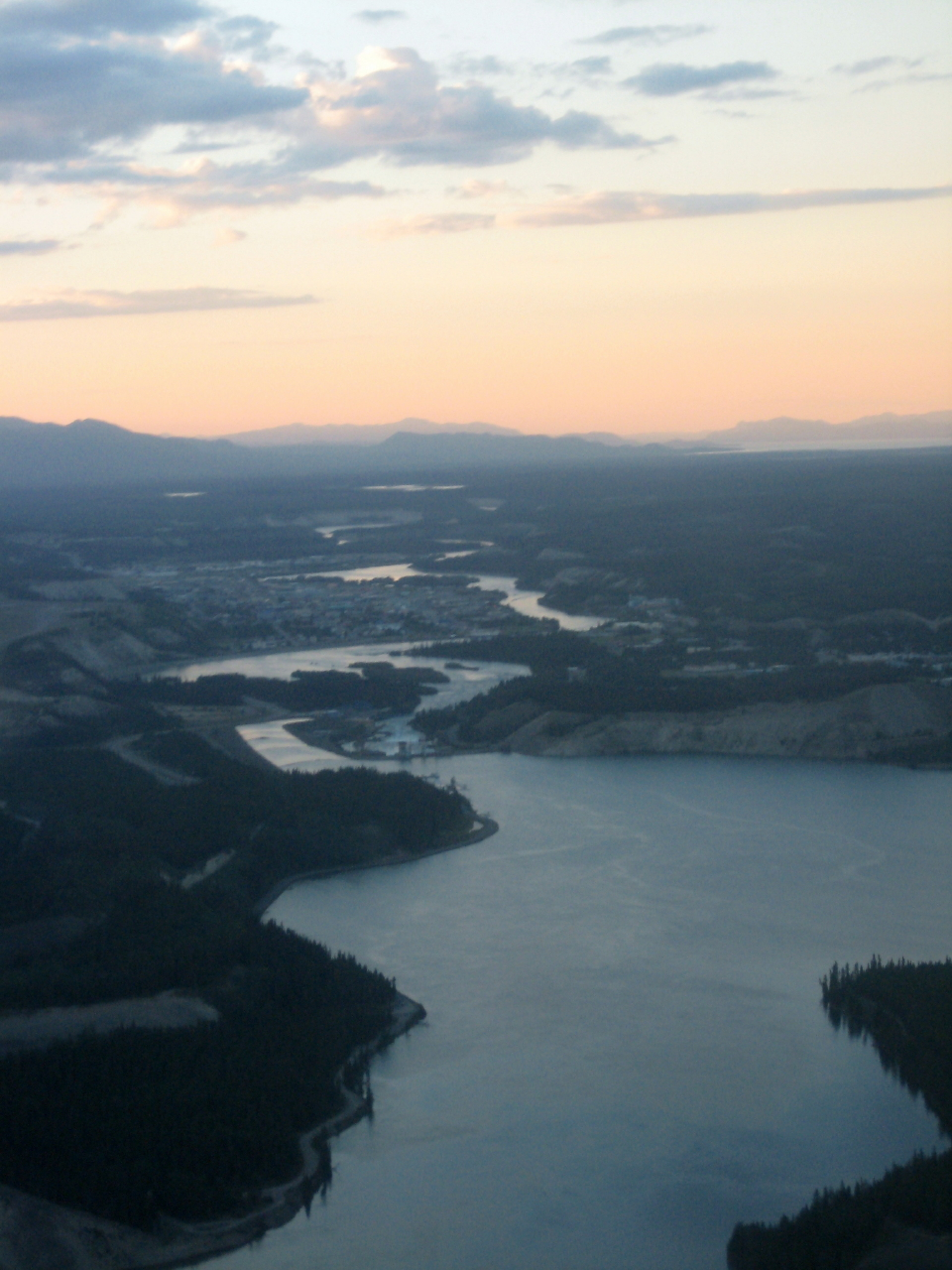
- Schwatka Lake

- Location within Yukon
- Location: Whitehorse, Yukon
- Coordinates: 60°41′05.4″N 135°01′36.5″W
- Type: reservoir
- Primary inflows: Yukon River
- Primary outflows: Yukon River
- Basin countries: Canada
- Surface area: 15 ha (37 acres)
- Average depth: 6–8 m (20–26 ft)

Schwatka Lake is a reservoir created by the damming of the Yukon River in Whitehorse, Yukon, completed in 1958. The dam provides electrical power generation and is operated by the Yukon Energy Corporation. The Whitehorse Rapids, which gave the city its name, are now under the lake. The lake was named after Frederick Schwatka, a US Army Lieutenant who was first to explore the total length of the Yukon River. The lake's surface area is about 15 hectares (37 acres) and a depth of about 6–8 metres (20–26 ft).

A fish ladder has been constructed around the hydroelectric dam to allow the passage of Chinook salmon to their spawning grounds upstream of Whitehorse. The Chinook salmon that pass the dam have the longest freshwater migration route of any salmon, over 3,000 kilometres to the mouth of the Yukon River in the Bering Sea.

Whitehorse Water Aerodrome, a float plane base, is located on the lake. The lake has been the city's water supply for some years, but the city is now converting to relying entirely on aquifers, partly due to the threat of pollution from fuel spills and other activities by people in the watershed of the lake.
