= Lists of generating stations in Canada =

Canada is home to a wide variety of power stations (or generating stations). The lists below outline power stations of significance by type, or by the province/territory in which they reside.

== By type ==
The following pages lists the power stations in Canada by type:

- List of largest power stations in Canada

Non-renewable energy

- Coal in Canada § List of coal-fired power stations
- List of natural gas-fired power stations in Canada
- Nuclear power in Canada § Power reactors

Renewable energy

- Geothermal power in Canada § Recent developments
- List of hydroelectric power stations in Canada
- List of photovoltaic power stations in Canada
- List of wind farms in Canada

== By province or territory ==
The following pages lists the power stations in Canada by province or territory:

- List of generating stations in Alberta
- List of generating stations in British Columbia
- List of generating stations in Manitoba
- List of generating stations in New Brunswick
- List of generating stations in Newfoundland and Labrador
- List of generating stations in the Northwest Territories
- List of generating stations in Nova Scotia
- List of generating stations in Nunavut
- List of generating stations in Ontario
- List of generating stations in Prince Edward Island
- List of generating stations in Quebec
- List of generating stations in Saskatchewan
- List of generating stations in Yukon

== See also ==
- List of largest power stations in the world
- List of power stations in France
- List of power stations in the United States
