= List of generating stations in Nunavut =

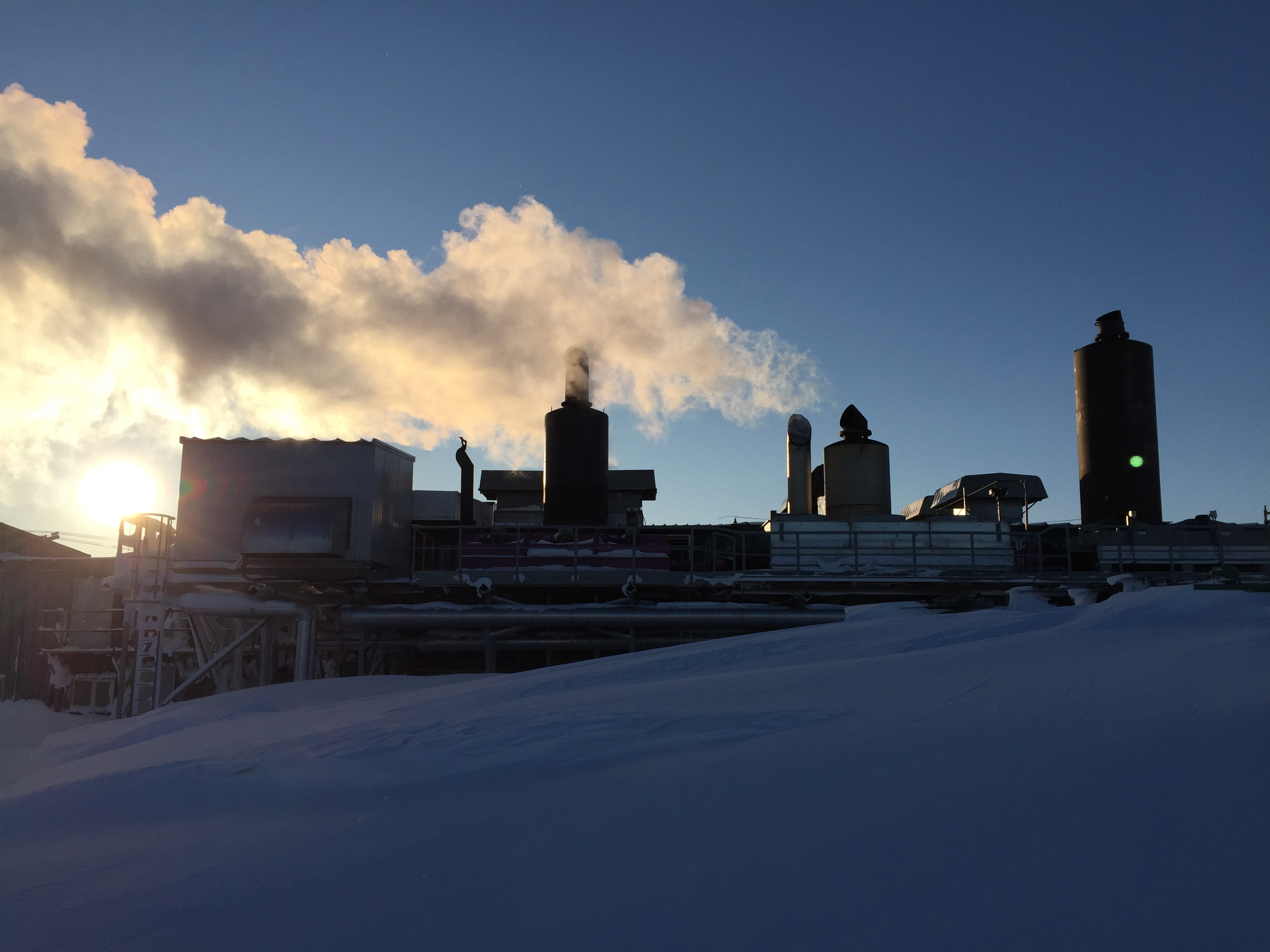
Rankin Inlet Diesel Power Station

This is a list of electrical generating stations in Nunavut, Canada. Totaling around 53mw of capacity

Qulliq Energy, a government-owned corporation, is the only electrical power provider that serves the remote communities that demographically comprise Nunavut. Qulliq, has a total of 25 power plants, each containing multiple diesel generators. This arrangement serves a total of 25 communities. The territory is not connected to the North American power grid.

== Diesel ==
List of all power plants using diesel generators in Nunavut. (Each station consists of a building that contains three or more engine-generator units.)

Name	Location	Capacity (MW)	Date
Arctic Bay	Arctic Bay	1.07	2021
Arviat	Arviat	2.24	1971–1997
Baker Lake	Baker Lake	2.24	1975–1985
Cambridge Bay	Cambridge Bay	3.11	1958
Chesterfield Inlet	Chesterfield Inlet	0.81	1975
Clyde River	Clyde River	1.35	1999
Coral Harbour	Coral Harbour	1.31	1988
Gjoa Haven	Gjoa Haven	1.65	1977
Grise Fiord	Grise Fiord	0.9	2019
Igloolik	Igloolik	1.74	1974
Iqaluit	Iqaluit	13.6	1964–2019
Kimmirut	Kimmirut	0.93	1992
Kinngait	Kinngait	1.8	2018
Kugaaruk	Kugaaruk	0.835	1974
Kugluktuk	Kugluktuk	2.22	1968
Naujaat	Naujaat	0.99	1970
Pangnirtung	Pangnirtung	2.22	2017
Pond Inlet	Pond Inlet	2.25	1992
Qikiqtarjuaq	Qikiqtarjuaq	1.305	2016
Rankin Inlet	Rankin Inlet	3.55	1973
Resolute Bay	Resolute Bay	2.05	1971
Sanikiluaq	Sanikiluaq	1.2	2000
Sanirajak	Sanirajak	1.345	1974
Taloyoak	Taloyoak	1.5	2016
Whale Cove	Whale Cove	0.75	1991

== See also ==
- Energy in Canada
- List of electrical generating stations in Canada
