= Yukon Energy =

Canadian crown corporation

Yukon Energy Corporation
- Native name: Société d'énergie du Yukon
- Type: Subsidiary
- Industry: Electric utility
- Founded: 1987; 39 years ago
- Area served: Yukon
- Owner: Government of Yukon
- Parent: Yukon Development Corporation
- Website: yukonenergy.ca

Yukon Energy Corporation (YEC; French: Société d'énergie du Yukon) is a Crown corporation that is the primary producer of electricity in the Canadian territory of Yukon. It also distributes electricity to a small number of locations not served by the privately owned ATCO Electric Yukon. YEC was established in 1987 to take over the Yukon assets of the Northern Canada Power Commission and is currently organised as a subsidiary of the Yukon Development Corporation. The company's headquarters is in Whitehorse, Yukon near the Whitehorse Rapids hydroelectric generating station.

== Profile ==
YEC generates virtually all of Yukon's electricity supply, and distributes power to a third of the locations outside of Whitehorse. Their largest customer (a wholesale buyer) is the Yukon Electrical Company (YECL), a private business that has been operating since 1901, which itself has some smaller hydro operations, and serves primarily the Whitehorse area plus two thirds of the rural communities. YEC itself provides customer electricity directly in Dawson City, Mayo, Faro, Champagne and to some isolated individual customers.

YEC has developed a grid that connects hydro facilities in Whitehorse (Schwatka Lake Dam - 40 MW from four wheels, the fourth added in 1983), Aishihik Lake - 30 MW, and the YECL facilities at Fish Lake near Whitehorse. The communities on the "Whitehorse-Aishihik-Faro" grid include Whitehorse, Champagne, Johnson's Crossing, Faro, and the following communities where it is distributed by YECL: Haines Junction, Carcross, Tagish, Marsh Lake, Teslin, Carmacks and Ross River.

YEC operates two wind turbines on Haeckel Hill near Whitehorse connected to the Whitehorse-Aishihik-Faro grid. The first turbine is a Bonus Energy 150 kW MARK III installed in 1993. The second turbine, a Vestas 660 kW V47 LT II was later installed in 2000. These units need to be specially adapted to deal with icing and the northern environment.

A second grid, brought on-line in 2004, connects Dawson City (reliant on diesel power from 1966 to 2004) via Stewart Crossing to Mayo, and beyond to the YECL-served communities of Elsa and Keno City, all drawing on the 5 MW hydro facility just north of Mayo that had mines at Elsa as primary customer until 1989.

The government of John Ostashek (1992-1996) had promised to connect Mayo, Stewart Crossing and YECL-served Pelly Crossing to the main southern grid at Carmacks. During their mandate, and the subsequent N.D.P. and Liberal party mandates, this project was not developed, and Pelly Crossing remained on its own YECL diesel generator. The project was finally proceeded with during the later part of the 2000s, partly to meet power requirements for mines in the Minto area, and on June 17, 2011, the two grids began to operate together. The YECL generator at Pelly Crossing is now on standby to the grid.

Off the grid, Yukon Electrical Company Limited operates diesel generators to serve its customers in Watson Lake-Upper Liard, Swift River, Burwash Landing, Destruction Bay, Beaver Creek and Old Crow. The possibility of a grid connection to Atlin, British Columbia has probably been eliminated by a decision to construct a hydro project near Atlin, but talk in Atlin of an expansion could still raise that possibility.

Yukon has no connections to the continental power grid, therefore, YEC cannot sell to or buy from networks in Alaska, British Columbia, Alberta or the Northwest Territories. In addition to the extreme expense of such transmission lines, they would also be subject to disruption from solar flares. In 2025, a new connection to the British Columbia network was announced.

== Electrical Service by Community ==
Name	Service Provider	Energy source	Notes
Beaver Creek	YECL	diesel plant	not on grid
Burwash Landing	YECL	diesel plant	not on grid
Canyon Creek (Mile 996 Alaska Hwy)	YECL	YEC grid	
Carcross	YECL	YEC grid	
Carmacks	YECL	YEC grid	
Champagne	YEC	YEC grid	
Dawson City	YEC	YEC grid	diesel backup (main power 1966-2004)
Deep Creek	YECL	YEC grid	
Destruction Bay	YECL	diesel plant	not on grid
Elsa	not sure - possibly YECL	YEC grid	
Faro	YEC	YEC grid	
Haines Junction	YECL	YEC grid	
Jake's Corner	YEC	YEC grid	
Johnson's Crossing	YEC	YEC grid	
Keno City	YECL	YEC grid	
Lower Post, British Columbia	YECL	diesel plant: Watson Lake	not on Yukon (Teslin) or B.C. grid (Fort Nelson)
Marsh Lake	YECL	YEC grid	
Mayo	YEC	YEC grid	
Old Crow	YECL	diesel plant	not on grid
Pelly Crossing	YECL	YEC grid	diesel backup (main until 2011)
Ross River	YECL	YEC grid	
Stewart Crossing	YECL	YEC grid	diesel backup (main until 2004)
Swift River	YECL	diesel plant	not on grid
Tagish	YECL	YEC grid	
Teslin	YECL	YEC grid	diesel backup (main until the 1980s)
Upper Liard	YECL	diesel plant: Watson Lake	not on grid
Watson Lake	YECL	diesel plant: Watson Lake	not on grid
Whitehorse	YECL	hydro facilities: YEC and YECL	diesel backup and auxiliary

== Generating Facilities ==
Name	Location	Fuel	Units net capacity (Date)	Capacity (net MW)	Link
Aishihik	Aishihik Lake	Hydroelectric	two units (1975); one unit (2011)	37.5 MW	
Dawson	Dawson City	Diesel generator	five fixed back-up units; one movable back-up unit		
Faro	Faro	Diesel generator	three fixed back-up units		
Haeckel Hill	Whitehorse	Wind Power	one Bonus 0.15 MW turbines (1993); one Vestas V47-660 0.66 MW turbine(2000)	0.81MW	
Mayo	Mayo	Diesel generator	two fixed back-up units		
Mayo Hydro	Mayo	Hydroelectric	two 2.5MW units (1951)	5 MW	
Whitehorse Rapids (Schwatka Lake)	Whitehorse	Hydroelectric	two units (1958); one unit (1969); one unit (1985)	40 MW	
Whitehorse Rapids	Whitehorse	Diesel generator	seven fixed back-up units; one movable back-up unit		

== See also ==
- Energy law#Canada
- List of Canadian electric utilities
- List of power stations in Yukon
