= Northland Utilities =

Northland Utilities Ltd.
- Type: Limited company
- Industry: Electric utility
- Founded: 1951; 75 years ago in Hay River Northwest Territories, Canada
- Headquarters: Canada
- Area served: Northwest Territories
- Owners: ATCO Electric (50%); Denendeh Investments (50%)
- Subsidiaries: Northland Utilities (Yellowknife); Northland Utilities (NWT)
- Website: northlandutilities.com

Northland Utilities Ltd. is a Canadian investor-owned electric utility that distributes electricity to customers in the Northwest Territories through two operating subsidiaries. The company is a joint venture between ATCO Electric and Denendeh Investments, with both owners holding 50 percent.

== Northland Utilities (Yellowknife) Limited ==
Northland Utilities (Yellowknife) Limited, was established in 1993, and serves Yellowknife and N'Dilo. This company purchases electricity from Northwest Territories Power Corporation's Snare Lake dam. Northland purchased Centra Power Inc. in 1991, obtaining Centra's franchise agreement with the City of Yellowknife.

== Northland Utilities (NWT) Limited ==
Northland Utilities (NWT) Limited was established in 1951 in Hay River. It provides electricity now to Hay River, Trout Lake, Kakisa, Dory Point, Fort Providence, Wekweti, Enterprise and to the Katl'odeeche First Nation. It buys power from the Taltson hydro system of Northwest Territories Power Corporation, and maintains a backup diesel generator in Hay River. In the small remote communities, Northland generates its own power for distribution.

== See also ==
- List of Canadian electric utilities
