= Northwest Territories Power Corporation =

- Company type: Subsidiary
- Industry: Electric utility
- Predecessor: Northern Canada Power Commission
- Founded: May 5, 1988; 38 years ago
- Area served: Northwest Territories
- Owner: Government of the Northwest Territories
- Parent: Northwest Territories Hydro
- Website: ntpc.com

The Northwest Territories Power Corporation (NTPC) is an electric utility in the Northwest Territories of Canada. NTPC was formed in 1988 to acquire and operate the former assets of the Northern Canada Power Commission in the Northwest Territories, including what is now Nunavut. Since 2007, NTPC is organized as a subsidiary of the Northwest Territories Hydro Corporation.

76% of NTPC's electrical generation is in the form of Hydro electricity. Hydro production has increased approximately 15% since 1990/91, reducing demand on diesel production and lower GHG emissions by 58% of 1990/91 levels. This has led NTPC to be recognized as a Gold Champion Level Reporter by the Canadian voluntary Challenge and Registry for seven consecutive years, including a leadership award, and an honourable mention.

NTPC sells electricity wholesale to Northland Utilities, a private company majority-owned by ATCO, which provides electricity in Yellowknife and Hay River. Liquid natural gas and diesel are used to generate electricity in Inuvik. All other communities served by NTPC generate power using diesel.

== See also ==
- List of Canadian electric utilities
- List of power stations in the Northwest Territories
