= Niagara Falls =

Waterfalls between the United States and Canada

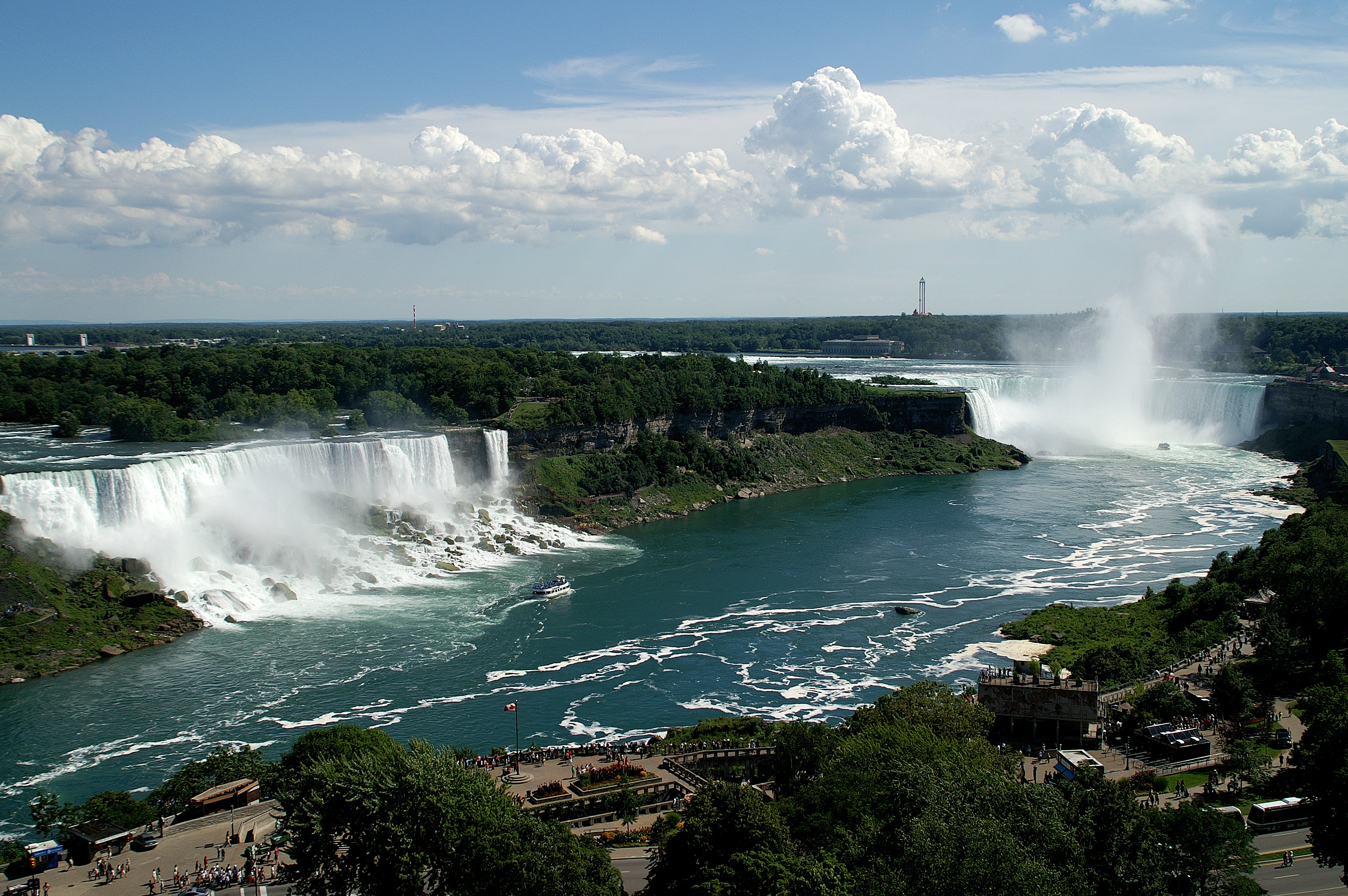
- Niagara Falls seen from the Canadian side of the river, including three individual falls (from left to right): American Falls, Bridal Veil Falls, and Horseshoe Falls

- Location within Southern Ontario Location within New York
- Location: Niagara River into the Niagara Gorge on the border of New York in the United States and Ontario in Canada
- Coordinates: 43.0799°N 79.0747°W
- Type: Cataract
- Total height: 167 ft (51 m)
- Number of drops: 3
- Watercourse: Niagara River
- Average flow rate: 85,000 cu ft/s (2,400 m^{3}/s)

Niagara Falls (Note: /naɪˈæɡərə, -ɡrə/ ny-AGG-ər-ə, -grə) is a group of three waterfalls at the southern end of Niagara Gorge, spanning the border between the Canadian province of Ontario and the U.S. state of New York. The largest of the three is Horseshoe Falls, which straddles the international border of the two countries. It is also known as the Canadian Falls. The smaller American Falls and Bridal Veil Falls lie within the United States.

Formed by the Niagara River, which drains Lake Erie into Lake Ontario, the combined falls have the highest flow rate of any waterfall in North America and the seventh largest in the world. During peak daytime tourist hours, more than 168,000 m^{3} (5.9 million ft^{3}) of water goes over the crest of the falls every minute.

Bridal Veil Falls is separated from Horseshoe Falls by Goat Island and from American Falls by Luna Island, with both islands situated in New York. Horseshoe Falls is the most powerful waterfall in North America, as measured by flow rate. Niagara Falls is famed for its beauty and is a valuable source of hydroelectric power. It is a well-known honeymoon and vacation destination for Canadians and Americans and often features in films and other media.

Balancing recreational, commercial, and industrial uses has been a challenge for the stewards of the falls since the 19th century. Niagara Falls is 27 kilometres (17 miles) northwest of Buffalo, New York, and 69 km (43 mi) southeast of Toronto, between the twin cities of Niagara Falls, Ontario, and Niagara Falls, New York. Niagara Falls was formed when glaciers receded at the end of the Wisconsin glaciation (the last ice age), and water from the newly formed Great Lakes carved a path over and through the Niagara Escarpment en route to the Atlantic Ocean.

== Etymology ==
Theories differ as to the origin of the name of the falls. The most common assumption is that it relates to Indigenous words for water itself. The Native American word Ongiara means thundering water; The New York Times used it as such in 1925. Fredrika Bremer supports this early attestation, claiming that Niagara is abbreviated from Oniaagarah or Ochniagarah known to First Nations Canadians as "the thunder of waters."

Etymologies for Niagara as a place name or geographic locator have also been proposed. George R. Stewart states that it comes from the name of an Iroquois town called Onguiaahra, meaning "point of land cut in two". In 1847, an Iroquois interpreter stated that the name came from Jaonniaka-re, meaning "noisy point or portage". To Mohawks, the name refers to "the neck", pronounced "onyara"; the portage or neck of land between lakes Erie and Ontario onyara. The modern Seneca name is Jo'sgöhsodö', meaning "the cliffs are standing." Etymonline supports this, asserting that it comes from Iroquoian and meaning "a neck", attested from 1841.

Philip D. Mason wrote this in his book Niagara: A Guide to the Niagara Frontier With Maps and Photographs: "The word 'Onguiaahra' appears on maps as early as 1641. Both it and the later version, 'Ongiara' are Indian words generally interpreted as meaning 'The Straight', although the more romantic 'Thunder of Waters' is sometimes given. By the time the first white men arrived at the Falls, the name in general use was 'Niagara'... when the first white men settled here, Niagara was occupied by a tribe of Iroquois or Six Nations Indians, who had themselves driven out or annihilated the earliest recorded inhabitants, the Neutral Indians".

Other theories hold that the name is an ethnonym. According to Iroquoian scholar Bruce Trigger, Niagara is derived from the name given to a branch of the local native Neutral Confederacy, who are described as the Niagagarega people on several late-17th-century French maps of the area.

== Characteristics ==
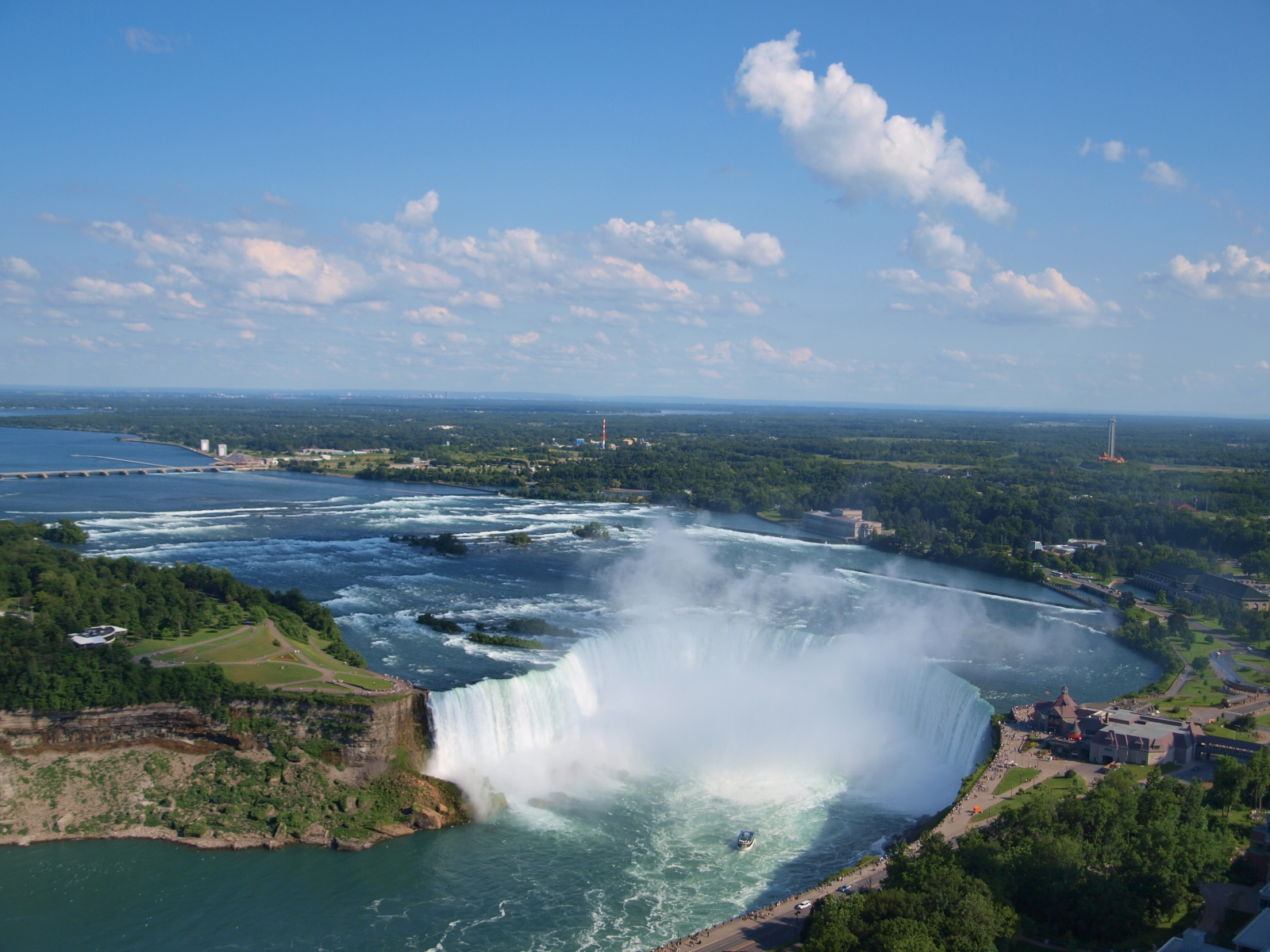
Canadian Horseshoe Falls at right

The larger and taller Horseshoe Falls is on the Canadian side; it is typically used in iconic tourist shots of the area. It stands about 57 m (187 ft) high, while the American Falls varies between 21 and 30 metres (69 and 98 feet) in drop because of giant boulders at its base. Horseshoe Falls is about 790 m (2,592 ft) wide, while the American Falls is 320 m (1,050 ft) wide. The distance between the American extremity of Niagara Falls and the Canadian extremity is 1,039 m (3,409 ft).

The peak flow over Horseshoe Falls was recorded at 6,370 cubic metres per second (225,000 cubic feet per second) by Ontario Hydro. The average annual flow rate is 2,400 m^{3}/s (85,000 cu ft/s). Since the flow is a direct function of the Lake Erie water elevation, it typically peaks in late spring or early summer. During the summer months, at least 2,800 m^{3}/s (99,000 cu ft/s) of water traverse the falls, some 90% of which goes over Horseshoe Falls, while the balance is diverted to hydroelectric facilities and then on to American Falls and Bridal Veil Falls. This is accomplished by employing a weir—the International Control Dam—with movable gates upstream from Horseshoe Falls.

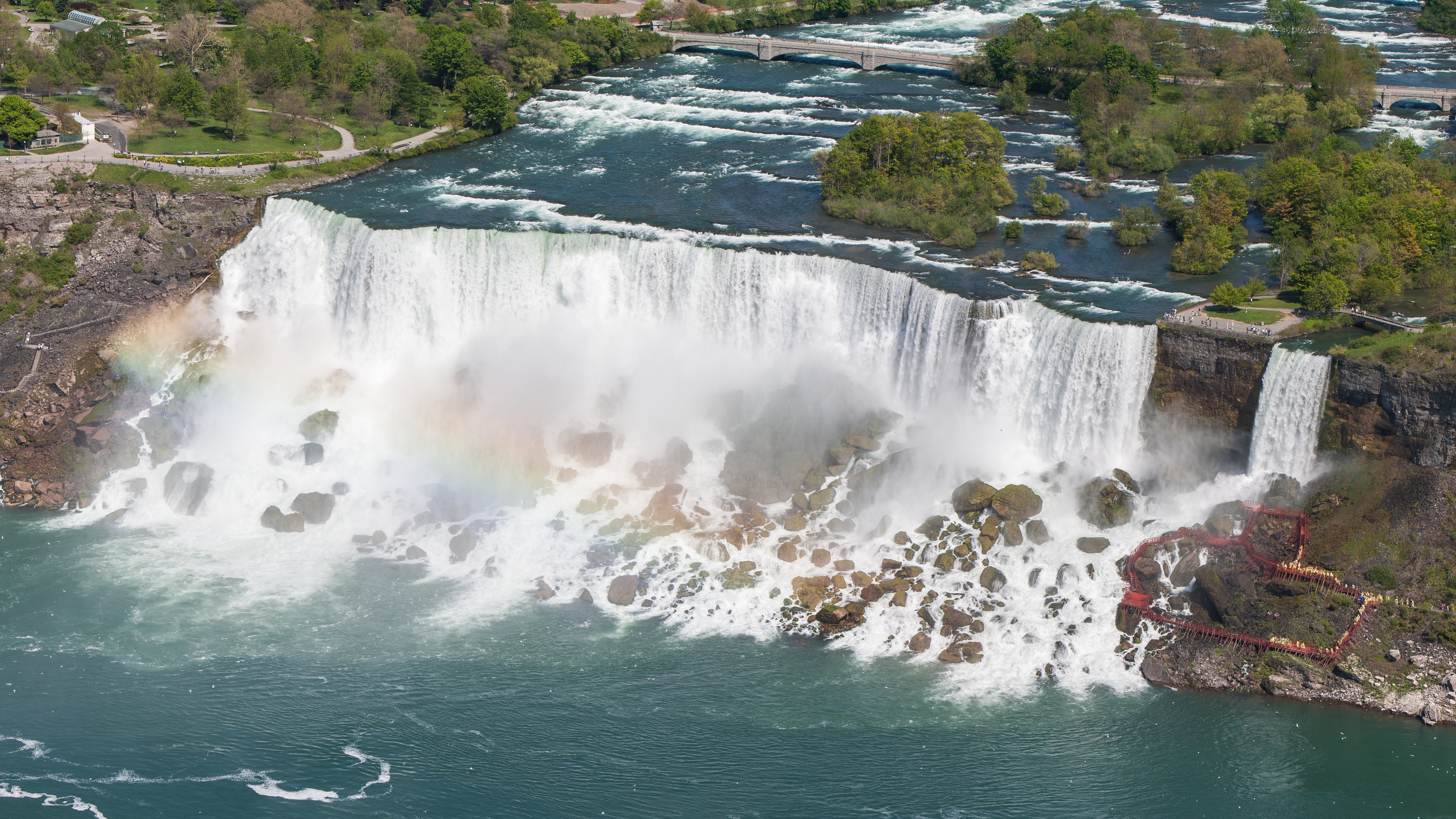
American Falls (large waterfall center-left) and Bridal Veil Falls (right)

The water flow is halved at night and during the low tourist season in winter months, and only attains a minimum flow of 1,400 cubic metres per second (49,000 cu ft/s). Water diversion is regulated by the Niagara River Treaty (1950) and is administered by the International Niagara Board of Control. The verdant green color of the water flowing over Niagara Falls is a byproduct of the estimated 60 tonnes/minute of dissolved salts and rock flour (very finely ground rock) generated by the erosive force of the Niagara River.

The Niagara River is an important bird area due to its impact on Bonaparte's gulls, ring-billed gulls, and herring gulls. Approximately 100,000 seagulls winter in the region, with it being common to spot 20,000 to 30,000 individuals daily between November and January. The river and waterfalls appeal to the birds due to their position on migratory routes, foraging potential, and unlikeliness to freeze over compared to other bodies of water.

== Geology ==
The features that became the falls were created by the Wisconsin glaciation about 10,000 years ago. The retreat of the ice sheet left behind a large amount of meltwater (see Lake Algonquin, Lake Chicago, Glacial Lake Iroquois, and Champlain Sea) that filled up the basins that the glaciers had carved, thus creating the Great Lakes as we know them today. Scientists posit there is an old valley, St David's Buried Gorge, buried by glacial drift, at the approximate location of the present Welland Canal.

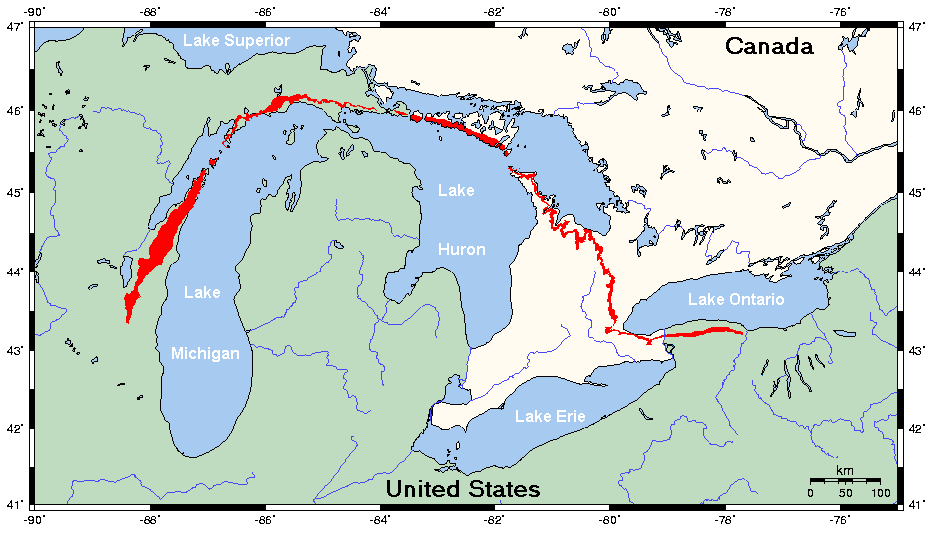
Niagara Escarpment (in red). Niagara Falls is center-right between Lake Ontario and Lake Erie.

When the ice melted, the upper Great Lakes emptied into the Niagara River, which followed the rearranged topography across the Niagara Escarpment. In time, the river cut a gorge through the north-facing cliff, or cuesta. Because of the interactions of three major rock formations, the rocky bed did not erode evenly. The caprock formation is composed of hard, erosion-resistant limestone and dolomite of the Lockport Formation (Middle Silurian). That hard layer of stone eroded more slowly than the underlying materials. Immediately below the caprock lies the weaker, softer, sloping Rochester Formation (Lower Silurian).

This formation is composed mainly of shale, though it has some thin limestone layers. It also contains ancient fossils. In time, the river eroded the soft layer that supported the hard layers, undercutting the hard caprock, which gave way in great chunks. This process was repeated countless times, eventually carving out the falls. Submerged in the river in the lower valley, hidden from view, is the Queenston Formation (Upper Ordovician), which is composed of shales and fine sandstones. All three formations were laid down in an ancient sea, their differences of character deriving from changing conditions within that sea.

About 10,900 years ago, the Niagara Falls was between present-day Queenston, Ontario, and Lewiston, New York, but erosion of the crest caused the falls to retreat approximately 10.9 kilometres (6.8 mi) southward. The shape of Horseshoe Falls has changed through the process of erosion, evolving from a small arch to a horseshoe bend to the present day V-shape. Just upstream from the falls' current location, Goat Island splits the course of the Niagara River, resulting in the separation of Horseshoe Falls to the west from the American and Bridal Veil Falls to the east. Engineering has slowed erosion and recession.

=== Erosion ===
The current rate of erosion is approximately 30 centimeters (12 inches) per year, down from a historical average of 1 to 1.5 m (3.3 to 4.9 ft) per year over at least the last 560 years. At this rate, in about 50,000 years Niagara Falls will have eroded the remaining 32 km (20 mi) to Lake Erie, and the falls will cease to exist.

In the 1870s, sightseers had limited access to Niagara Falls and often had to pay for a glimpse, and industrialization threatened to carve up Goat Island to further expand commercial development. Other industrial encroachments and lack of public access led to a conservation movement in the U.S. known as Free Niagara, led by such notables as Hudson River School artist Frederic Edwin Church, landscape designer Frederick Law Olmsted, and architect Henry Hobson Richardson. Church approached Lord Dufferin, governor-general of Canada, with a proposal for international discussions on the establishment of a public park.

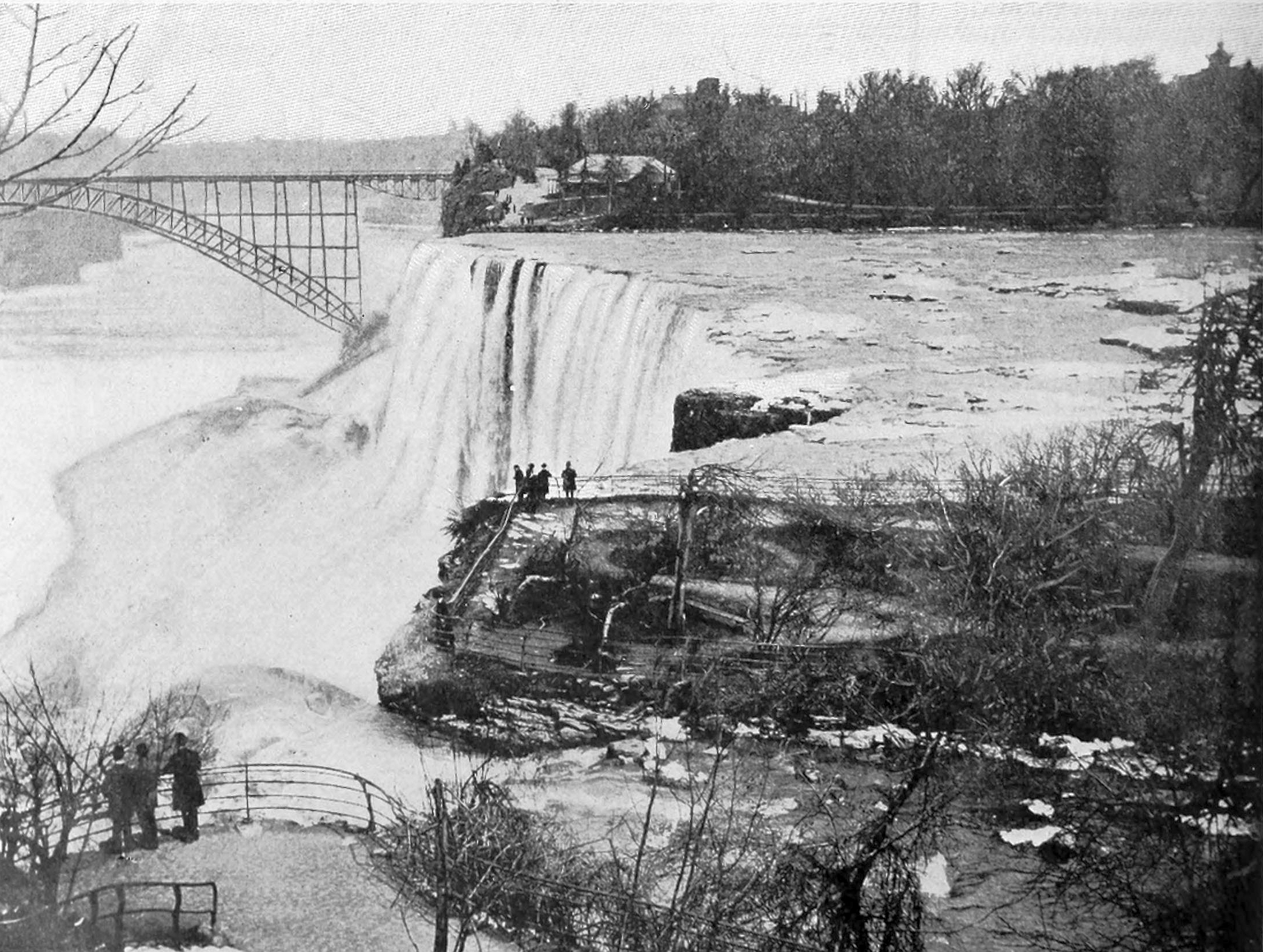
Damage from wind and ice on Goat Island, 1903

Goat Island was one of the inspirations for the American side of the effort. William Dorsheimer, moved by the scene from the island, brought Olmsted to Buffalo in 1868 to design a city park system, which helped promote Olmsted's career. In 1879, the New York state legislature commissioned Olmsted and James T. Gardner to survey the falls and to create the single most important document in the Niagara preservation movement, a "Special Report on the preservation of Niagara Falls". The report advocated for state purchase, restoration and preservation through public ownership of the scenic lands surrounding Niagara Falls. Restoring the former beauty of the falls was described in the report as a "sacred obligation to mankind". In 1883, New York Governor Grover Cleveland drafted legislation authorizing acquisition of lands for a state reservation at Niagara, and the Niagara Falls Association, a private citizens group founded in 1882, mounted a great letter-writing campaign and petition drive in support of the park. Professor Charles Eliot Norton and Olmsted were among the leaders of the public campaign, while New York Governor Alonzo Cornell opposed.

Preservationists' efforts were rewarded on April 30, 1885, when Governor David B. Hill signed legislation creating the Niagara Reservation, New York's first state park. New York State began to purchase land from developers, under the charter of the Niagara Reservation State Park. In the same year, the province of Ontario established the Queen Victoria Niagara Falls Park for the same purpose. On the Canadian side, the Niagara Parks Commission governs land usage along the entire course of the Niagara River, from Lake Erie to Lake Ontario.

In 1887, Olmsted and Calvert Vaux issued a supplemental report detailing plans to restore the falls. Their intent was "to restore and conserve the natural surroundings of the Falls of Niagara, rather than to attempt to add anything thereto", and the report anticipated fundamental questions, such as how to provide access without destroying the beauty of the falls, and how to restore natural landscapes damaged by man. They planned a park with scenic roadways, paths and a few shelters designed to protect the landscape while allowing large numbers of visitors to enjoy the falls. Commemorative statues, shops, restaurants, and a 1959 glass and metal observation tower were added later. Preservationists continue to strive to strike a balance between Olmsted's idyllic vision and the realities of administering a popular scenic attraction.

Preservation efforts continued well into the 20th century. J. Horace McFarland, the Sierra Club, and the Appalachian Mountain Club persuaded the United States Congress in 1906 to enact legislation to preserve the falls by regulating the waters of the Niagara River. The act sought, in cooperation with the Canadian government, to restrict diversion of water, and a treaty resulted in 1909 that limited the total amount of water diverted from the falls by both nations to approximately 1,600 cubic metres per second (56,000 cu ft/s). That limitation remained in effect until 1950.

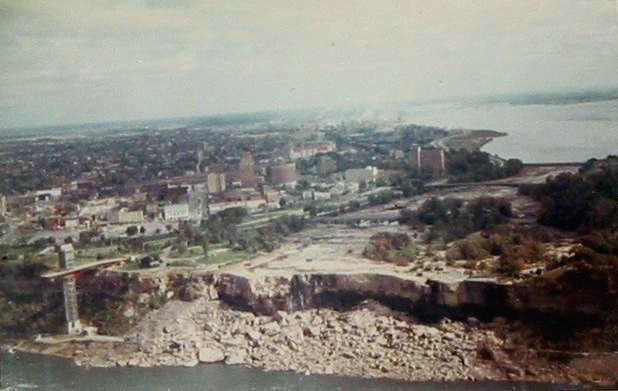
American and Bridal Falls diverted during erosion control efforts in 1969

Erosion control efforts have always been of importance. Underwater weirs redirect the most damaging currents, and the top of the falls has been strengthened. In June 1969, a temporary rock and earth dam was constructed, completely diverting the Niagara River from American Falls for several months. During this time, two bodies were removed from under the falls, including a man who had been seen jumping over the falls, and the body of a woman, which was discovered once the falls dried. While Horseshoe Falls absorbed the extra flow, the U.S. Army Corps of Engineers studied the riverbed and mechanically bolted and strengthened any faults they found; faults that would, if left untreated, have hastened the retreat of American Falls. A plan to remove the huge mound of talus deposited in 1954 was abandoned owing to cost, and in November 1969, the temporary dam was dynamited, restoring flow to American Falls. Even after these undertakings, Luna Island, the small piece of land between the American Falls and Bridal Veil Falls, remained off limits to the public for years owing to fears that it was unstable and could collapse into the gorge.

Commercial interests have continued to encroach on the land surrounding the state park, including the construction of several tall buildings (most of them hotels) on the Canadian side. The result is a significant alteration and urbanization of the landscape. One study found that the tall buildings changed the breeze patterns and increased the number of mist days from 29 per year to 68 per year, but another study disputed this idea.

In 2013, New York State began an effort to renovate Three Sisters Islands located south of Goat Island. Funds were used from the re-licensing of the New York Power Authority hydroelectric plant downriver in Lewiston, New York, to rebuild walking paths on the Three Sisters Islands and to plant native vegetation on the islands. The state also renovated the area around Prospect Point at the brink of American Falls in the state park.

== History ==
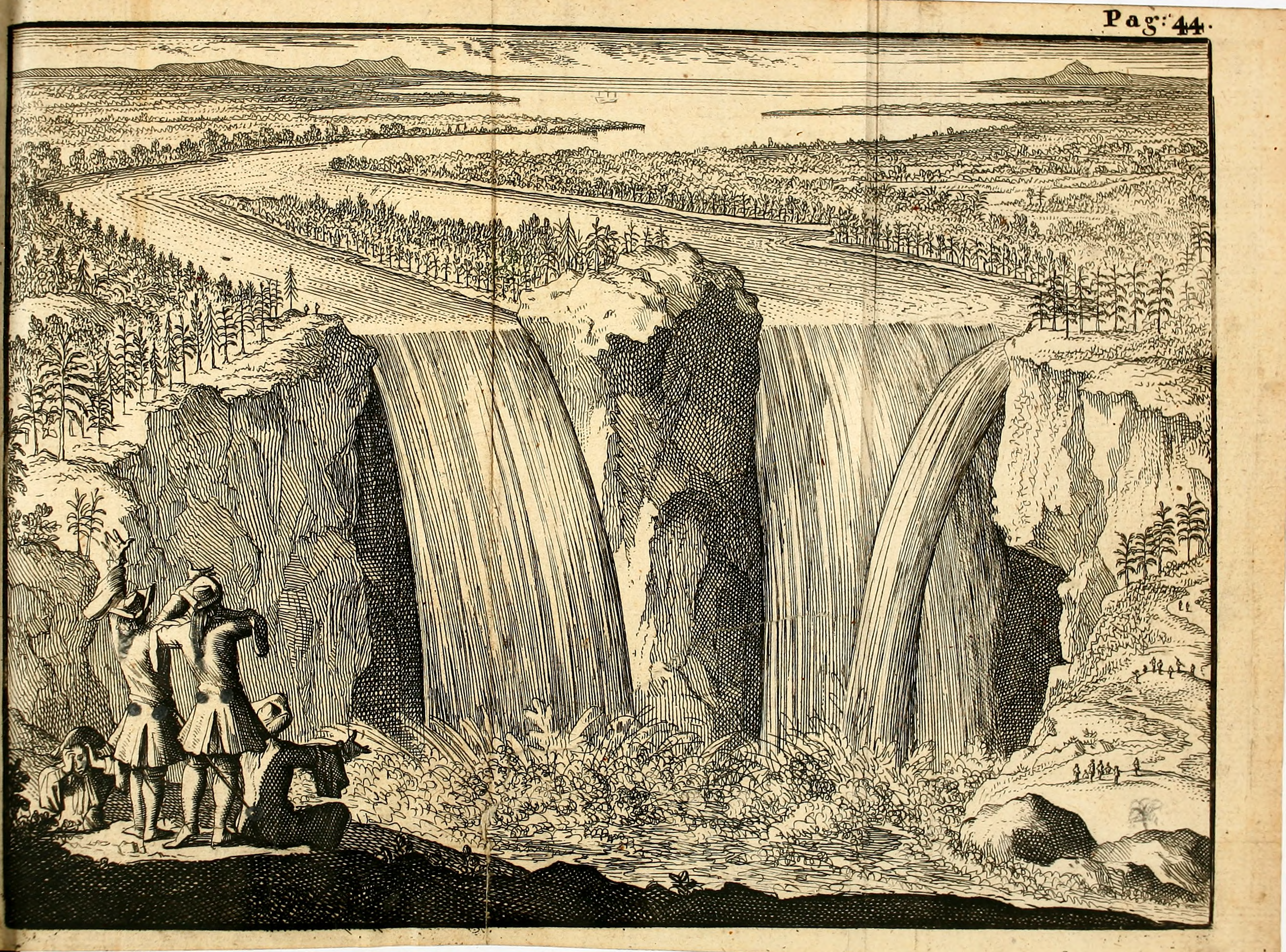
Louis Hennepin is depicted in front of the falls in this 1698 print.

Many figures have been suggested as the first to circulate a European eyewitness description of Niagara Falls. The Frenchman Samuel de Champlain visited the area as early as 1604 during his exploration of what is now Canada, and members of his party reported to him the spectacular waterfalls, which he described in his journals. The first description of the falls is credited to Belgian missionary Father Louis Hennepin in 1677, after travelling with the explorer René-Robert Cavelier, Sieur de La Salle, thus bringing the falls to the attention of Europeans. French Jesuit missionary Paul Ragueneau likely visited the falls some 35 years before Hennepin's visit while working among the Huron First Nation in Canada. Jean de Brébeuf also may have visited the falls, while spending time with the Neutral Nation. The Finland-Swedish naturalist Pehr Kalm explored the area in the early 18th century and is credited with the first scientific description of the falls. In 1762, Captain Thomas Davies, a British Army officer and artist, surveyed the area and painted the watercolor, An East View of the Great Cataract of Niagara, the first eyewitness painting of the falls.

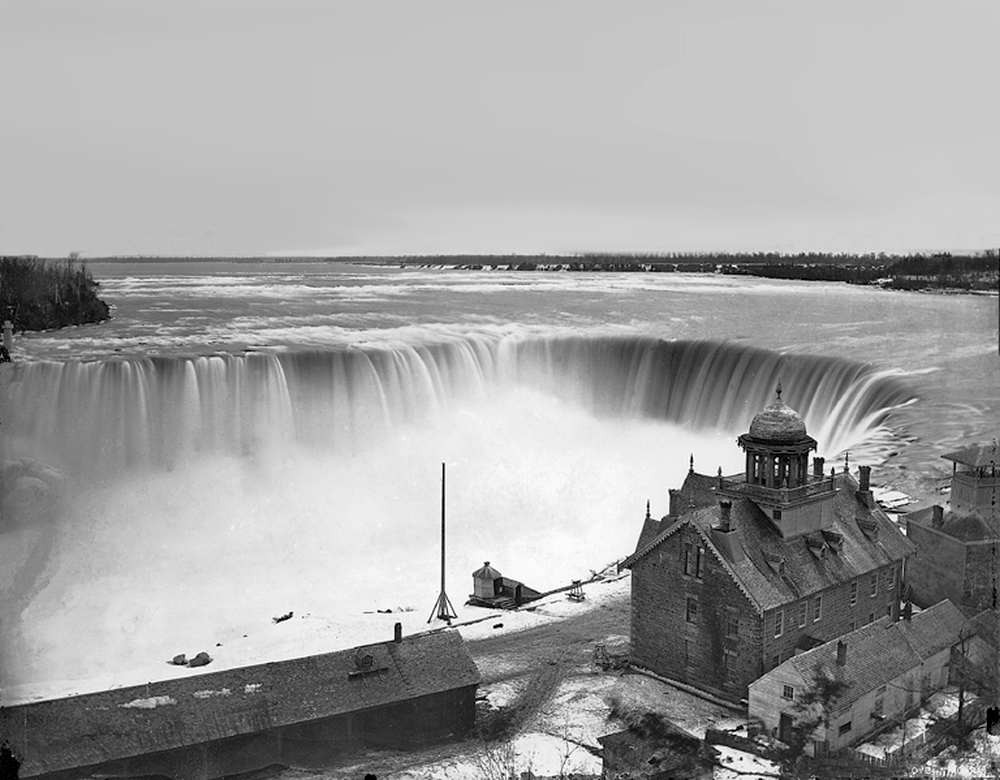
Horseshoe Falls, 1869

During the 19th century, tourism became popular, and by the mid-century, it was the area's main industry. Theodosia Burr Alston (daughter of Vice President Aaron Burr) and her husband Joseph Alston were the first recorded couple to honeymoon there in 1801. Napoleon Bonaparte's brother Jérôme visited with his bride in the early 19th century. In 1825, British explorer John Franklin visited the falls while passing through New York en route to Cumberland House as part of his second Arctic expedition, calling them "so justly celebrated as the first in the world for grandeur".

In 1843, Frederick Douglass joined the American Anti-Slavery Society's "One Hundred Conventions" tour throughout New York and the midwest. Sometime on this tour, Douglass visited Niagara Falls and wrote a brief account of the experience: "When I came into its awful presence, the power of description failed me, an irresistible power closed my lips." Being on the Canadian border, Niagara Falls was on one of the routes of the Underground Railroad. The falls were also a popular tourist attraction for Southern slaveowners, who would bring their enslaved workers on the trip. "Many a time the trusted body-servant, or slave-girl, would leave master or mistress in the discharge of some errand, and never come back." This sometimes led to conflict. Early town father Peter Porter assisted slavecatchers in finding runaway slaves, even leading, in the case of runaway Solomon Moseby, to a riot in Niagara-on-the-Lake, Canada. Much of this history is memorialized in the Niagara Falls Underground Railroad Heritage Center. After the American Civil War, the New York Central Railroad publicized Niagara Falls as a focus of pleasure and honeymoon visits. After World War II, the auto industry, along with local tourism boards, began to promote Niagara honeymoons.

In about 1840, the English industrial chemist Hugh Lee Pattinson traveled to Canada, stopping at Niagara Falls long enough to make the earliest known photograph of the falls, a daguerreotype in the collection of Newcastle University. It was once believed that the small figure standing silhouetted with a top hat was added by an engraver working from imagination as well as the daguerreotype as his source, but the figure is clearly present in the photograph. Because of the very long exposure required, of ten minutes or more, the figure is assumed by Canada's Niagara Parks agency to be Pattinson. The image is left-right inverted and taken from the Canadian side. Pattinson made other photographs of Horseshoe Falls; these were then transferred to engravings to illustrate Noël Marie Paymal Lerebours' Excursions Daguerriennes (Paris, 1841–1864).

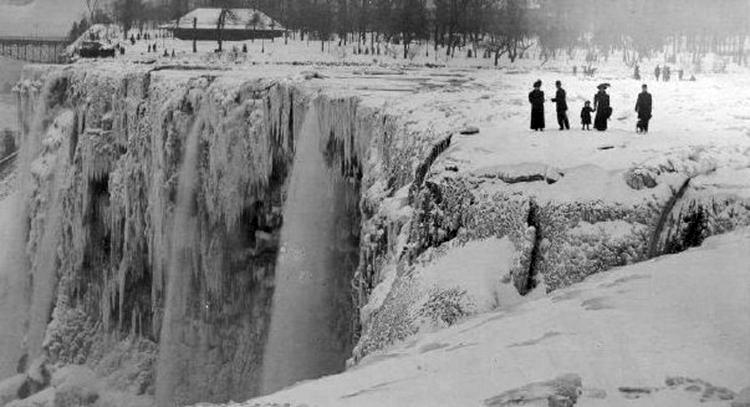
American Falls frozen over with people on the ice, 1911

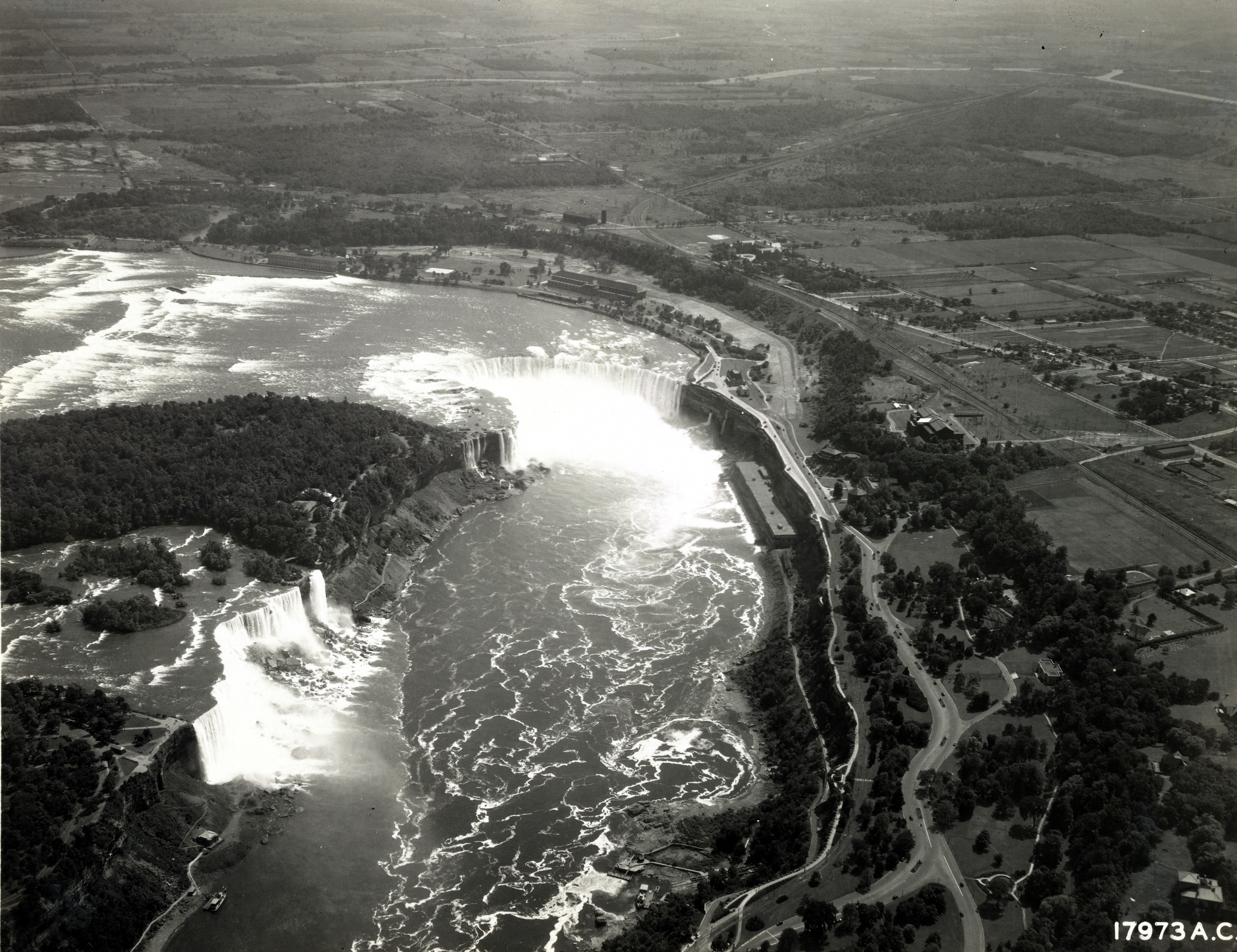
Aerial photograph of Niagara Falls, 1931

On August 6, 1918, an iron scow became stuck on the rocks above the falls. The two men on the scow were rescued, but the vessel remained trapped on rocks in the river, and is still visible there in a deteriorated state, although its position shifted by 50 meters (160 ft) during a storm on October 31, 2019. Daredevil William "Red" Hill Sr. was particularly praised for his role in the rescue.

After the First World War, tourism boomed as automobiles made getting to the falls much easier. The story of Niagara Falls in the 20th century is largely that of efforts to harness the energy of the falls for hydroelectric power, and to control the development on both sides that threaten the area's natural beauty. Before the late 20th century, the northeastern end of Horseshoe Falls was in the United States, flowing around the Terrapin Rocks, which were once connected to Goat Island by a series of bridges. In 1955, the area between the rocks and Goat Island was filled in, creating Terrapin Point. In the early 1980s, the U.S. Army Corps of Engineers filled in more land and built diversion dams and retaining walls to force the water away from Terrapin Point. Altogether, 120 m (400 ft) of Horseshoe Falls were eliminated, including 30 m (100 ft) on the Canadian side. According to author Ginger Strand, the Horseshoe Falls is now entirely in Canada. Other sources say "most of" Horseshoe Falls is in Canada.

The only recorded freeze-up of the river and falls was caused by an ice jam on March 29, 1848. No water (or at best a trickle) fell for as much as 40 hours. Waterwheels stopped, and mills and factories shut down for having no power. In 1912, American Falls was completely frozen, but the other two falls kept flowing. Although the falls commonly ice up most winters, the river and the falls do not freeze completely. The years 1885, 1902, 1906, 1911, 1932, 1936, 2014, 2017 and 2019 are noted for partial freezing of the falls. A so-called ice bridge was common in certain years at the base of the falls and was used by people who wanted to cross the river before bridges had been built. During some winters, the ice sheet was as thick as 12 to 30 metres (40 to 100 ft), but that thickness has not occurred since 1954. The ice bridge of 1841 was said to be at least 30 metres (100 ft) thick. On February 4, 1912, the ice bridge, which had formed on January 15 began breaking up while people were still on it. Many escaped, but three died during the event, later named the Ice Bridge Tragedy.

== Bridge crossings ==
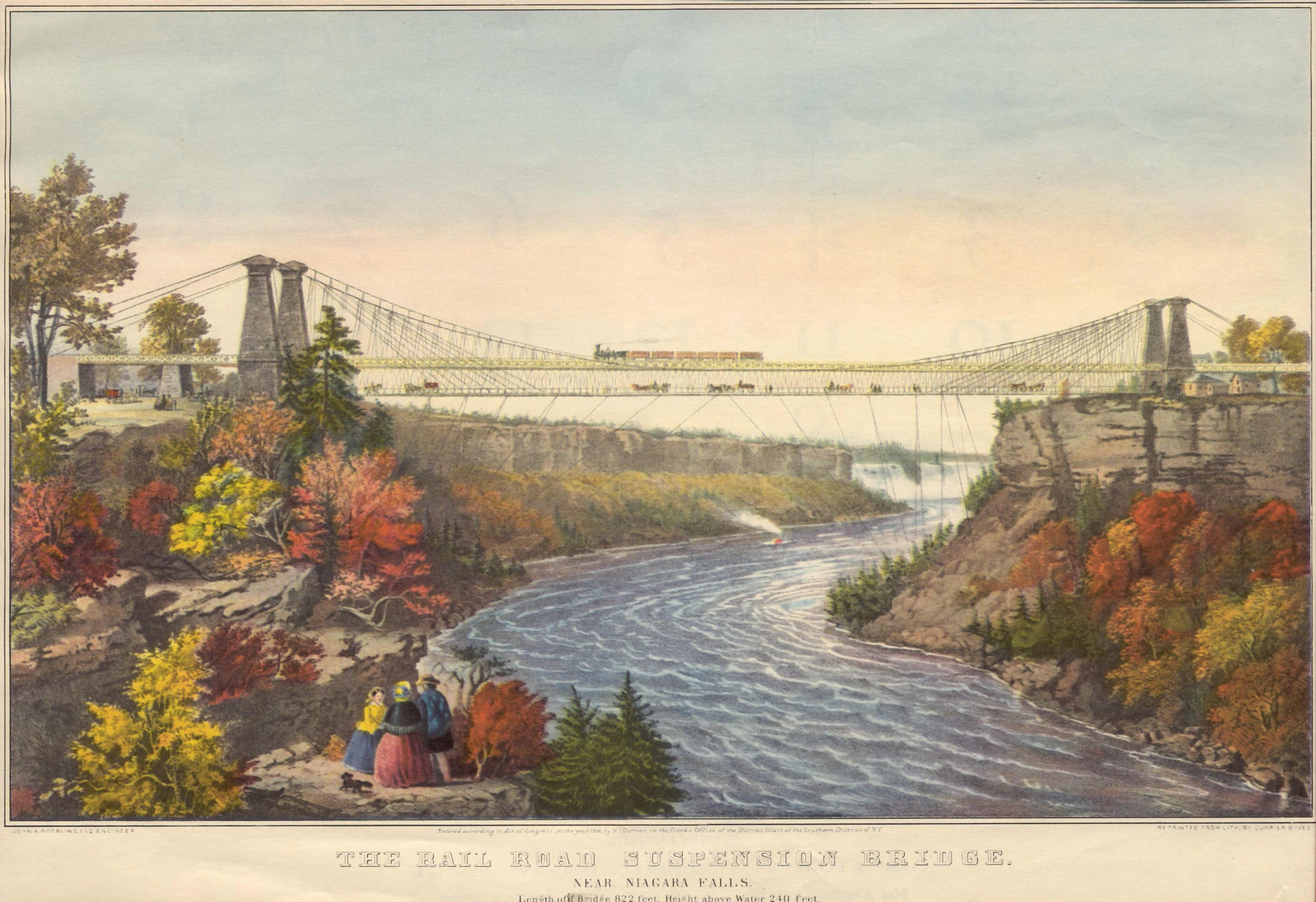
Hand-colored lithograph of the (double-decked) Niagara Suspension Bridge, c. 1856

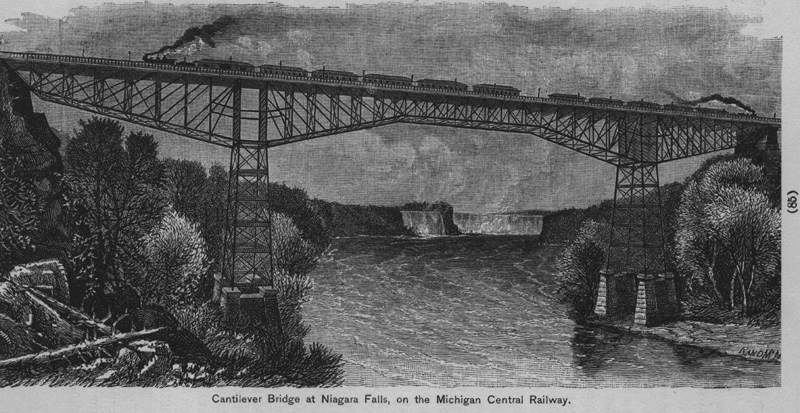
Niagara Cantilever Bridge, c. 1895

A number of bridges have spanned the Niagara River in the general vicinity of the falls. The first, not far from the whirlpool, was a suspension bridge above the gorge. It opened for use by the public in July 1848 and remained in use until 1855. A second bridge in the Upper Falls area was commissioned, with two levels or decks, one for use by the Great Western Railway. This Niagara Falls Suspension Bridge opened in 1855. It was used by conductors on the Underground Railroad to escort runaway slaves to Canada. In 1882, the Grand Trunk Railway took over control of the second deck after it absorbed the Great Western company. Significant structural improvements were made in the late 1870s and then in 1886; this bridge remained in use until 1897.

Because of the volume of traffic, the decision was made to construct a new arch bridge nearby, under and around the existing bridge. After it opened in September 1897, a decision was made to remove and scrap the railway suspension bridge. This new bridge was initially known as the Niagara Railway Arch, or Lower Steel Arch Bridge; it had two decks, the lower one used for carriages and the upper for trains. In 1937, it was renamed the Whirlpool Rapids Bridge and remains in use today. All of the structures built up to that time were referred to as Lower Niagara bridges and were some distance from the falls.

The first bridge in the so-called Upper Niagara area (closer to the falls) was a two-level suspension structure that opened in January 1869; it was destroyed during a severe storm in January 1889. The replacement was built quickly and opened in May 1889. In order to handle heavy traffic, a second bridge was commissioned, slightly closer to American Falls. This one was a steel bridge and opened to traffic in June 1897; it was known as the Upper Steel Arch Bridge but was often called the Honeymoon Bridge. The single level included a track for trolleys and space for carriages and pedestrians. The design led to the bridge being very close to the surface of the river and in January 1938, an ice jam twisted the steel frame of the bridge which later collapsed on January 27, 1938.

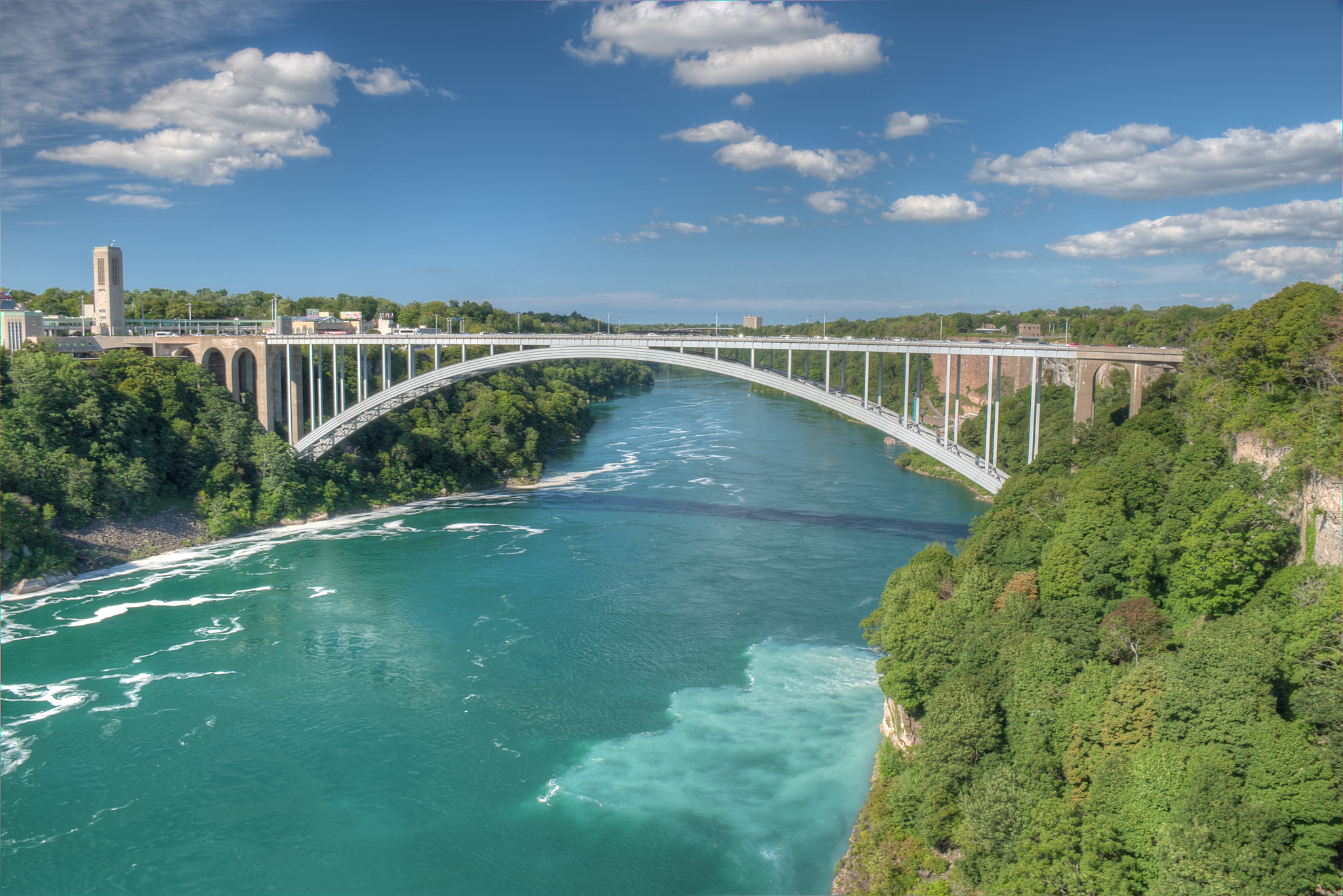
The Rainbow Bridge, the first bridge downstream from the falls

Another Lower Niagara bridge had been commissioned in 1883 by Cornelius Vanderbilt for use by railways at a location roughly approximately 60 metres (200 ft) south of the Railway Suspension Bridge. This one was of an entirely different design; it was a cantilever bridge to provide greater strength. The Niagara Cantilever Bridge had two cantilevers which were joined by steel sections; it opened officially in December 1883, and improvements were made over the years for a stronger structure. As rail traffic was increasing, the Michigan Central Railroad company decided to build a new bridge in 1923, to be located between the Lower Steel Arch Bridge and the Cantilever Bridge. The Michigan Central Railway Bridge opened in February 1925 and remained in use until the early 21st century. The Cantilever Bridge was removed and scrapped after the new rail bridge opened. Nonetheless, it was inducted into the North America Railway Hall of Fame in 2006.

There was a lengthy dispute as to which agency should build the replacement for the Niagara Railway Arch, or Lower Steel Arch Bridge in the Upper Niagara area. When that was resolved, construction of a steel bridge commenced in February 1940. Named the Rainbow Bridge, and featuring two lanes for traffic separated by a barrier, it opened in November 1941 and remains in use today.

== Industry and commerce ==
=== Hydroelectric power ===
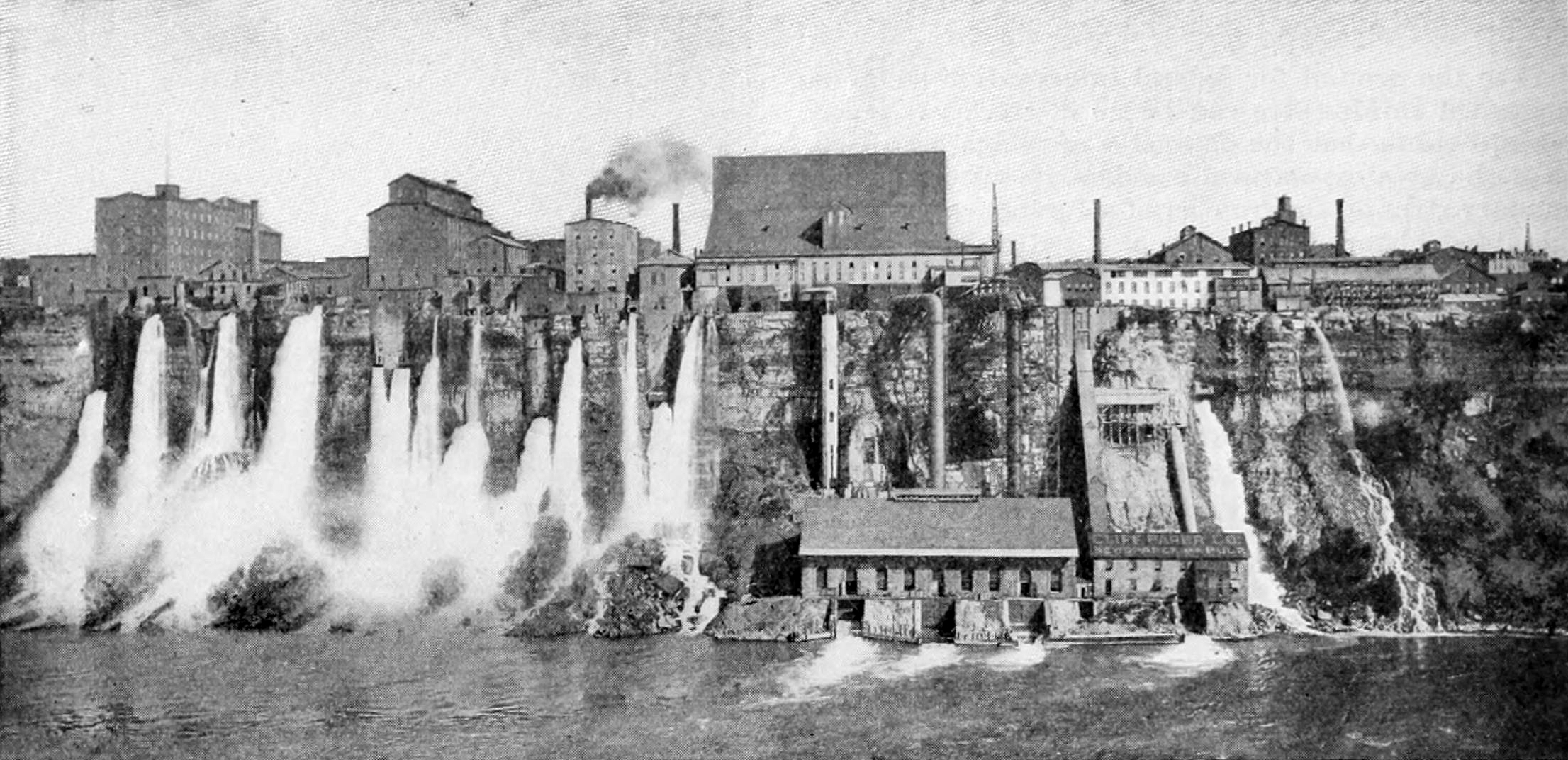
New York side of Niagara Gorge, c. 1901

The enormous energy of Niagara Falls has long been recognized as a potential source of power. The first known effort to harness the waters was in 1750, when Daniel Joncaire built a small canal above the falls to power his sawmill. Augustus and Peter Porter purchased this area and all of American Falls in 1805 from the New York state government, and enlarged the original canal to provide hydraulic power for their gristmill and tannery. In 1853, the Niagara Falls Hydraulic Power and Mining Company was chartered, which eventually constructed the canals that would be used to generate electricity. In 1881, under the leadership of Jacob F. Schoellkopf, the Niagara River's first hydroelectric generating station was built. The water fell 26 metres (86 ft) and generated direct current electricity, which ran the machinery of local mills and lit up some of the village streets.

The Niagara Falls Power Company, a descendant of Schoellkopf's firm, formed the Cataract Company headed by Edward Dean Adams, with the intent of expanding Niagara Falls' power capacity. In 1890, a five-member International Niagara Commission headed by Sir William Thomson among other distinguished scientists deliberated on the expansion of Niagara hydroelectric capacity based on seventeen proposals but could not select any as the best combined project for hydraulic development and distribution. In 1893, Westinghouse Electric (which had built the smaller-scale Ames Hydroelectric Generating Plant near Ophir, Colorado, two years earlier) was hired to design a system to generate alternating current on Niagara Falls, and three years after that a large-scale AC power system was created (activated on August 26, 1895). The Adams Power Plant Transformer House remains as a landmark of the original system.

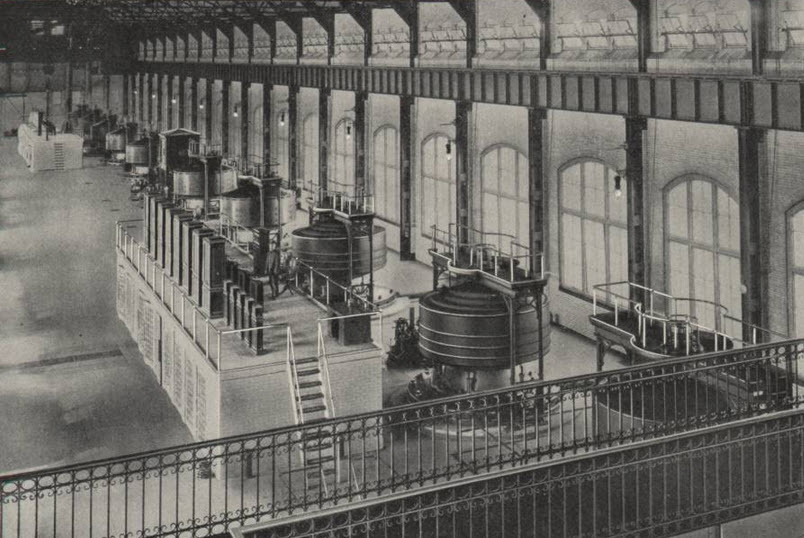
Ten 5,000 HP Westinghouse generators at Edward Dean Adams Power Plant

By 1896, financing from moguls including J. P. Morgan, John Jacob Astor IV, and the Vanderbilts had fueled the construction of giant underground conduits leading to turbines generating upwards of 75 megawatts (100,000 hp), sent as far as Buffalo, 32 km (20 mi) away. Some of the original designs for the power transmission plants were created by the Swiss firm Faesch & Piccard, which also constructed the original 3.7 MW (5,000 hp) waterwheels. Private companies on the Canadian side also began to harness the energy of the falls. The Government of Ontario eventually brought power transmission operations under public control in 1906, distributing Niagara's energy to various parts of the Canadian province.

Other hydropower plants were being built along the Niagara River. But in 1956, disaster struck when the region's largest hydropower station was partially destroyed in a landslide. This drastically reduced power production and put tens of thousands of manufacturing jobs at stake. In 1957, Congress passed the Niagara Redevelopment Act, which granted the New York Power Authority the right to fully develop the United States' share of the Niagara River's hydroelectric potential.

In 1961, when the Niagara Falls hydroelectric project went online, it was the largest hydropower facility in the Western world. Today, Niagara is still the largest electricity producer in New York state, with a generating capacity of 2.4 GW. Up to 1,420 cubic metres per second (50,000 cu ft/s) of water is diverted from the Niagara River through conduits under the city of Niagara Falls to the Lewiston and Robert Moses power plants. Currently between 50% and 75% of the Niagara River's flow is diverted via four huge tunnels that arise far upstream from the waterfalls. The water then passes through hydroelectric turbines that supply power to nearby areas of Canada and the United States before returning to the river well past the falls. When electrical demand is low, the Lewiston units can operate as pumps to transport water from the lower bay back up to the plant's reservoir, allowing this water to be used again during the daytime when electricity use peaks. During peak electrical demand, the same Lewiston pumps are reversed and become generators.

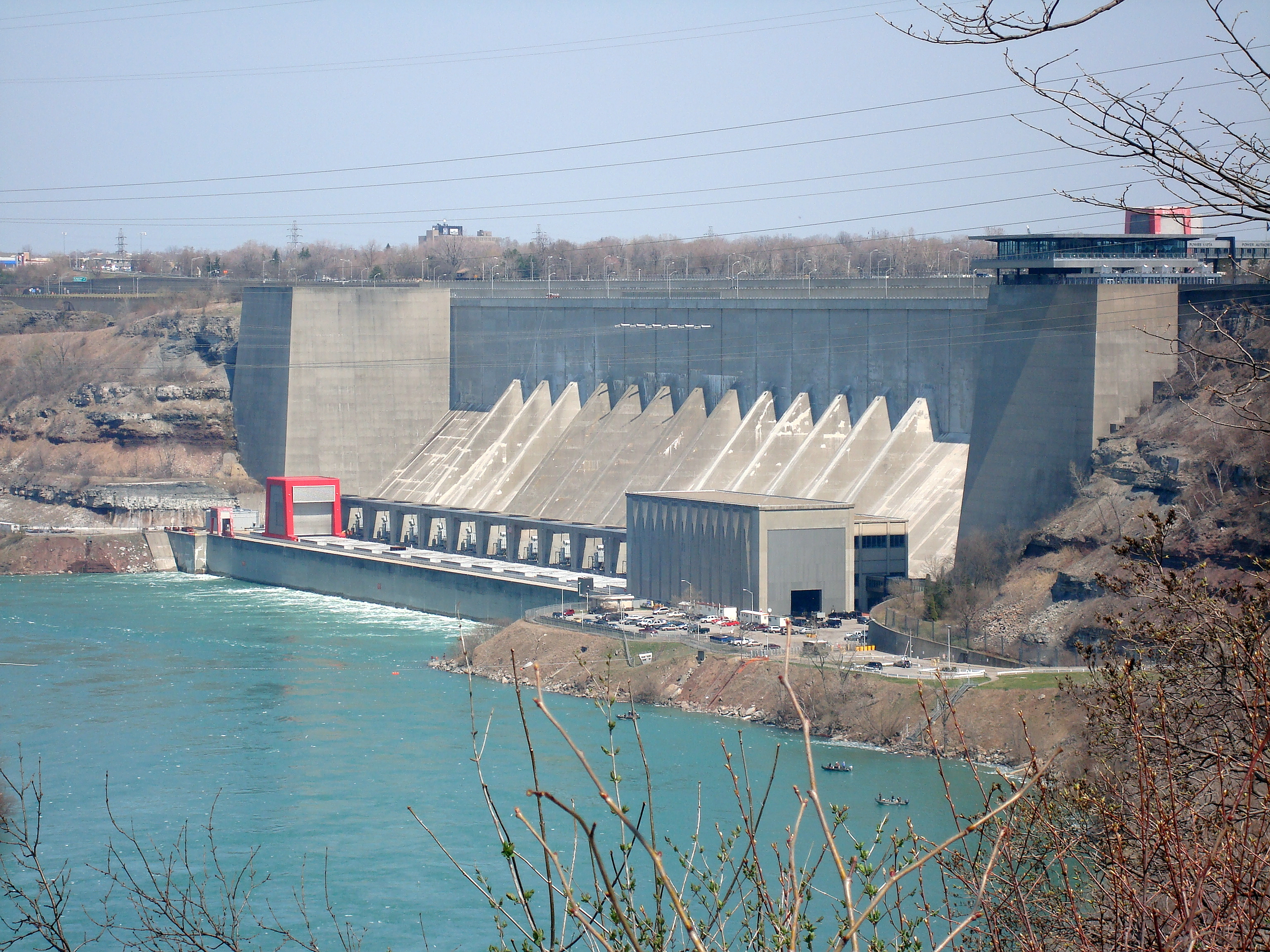
Robert Moses Niagara Power Plant in Lewiston, New York

In August 2005, Ontario Power Generation, which is responsible for the Sir Adam Beck stations, started a major civil engineering project, called the Niagara Tunnel Project, to increase power production by building a new 12.7-metre (42 ft) diameter, 10.2-kilometre-long (6.3 mi) water diversion tunnel. It was officially placed into service in March 2013, helping to increase the generating complex's nameplate capacity by 150 megawatts. It did so by tapping water from farther up the Niagara River than was possible with the preexisting arrangement. The tunnel provided new hydroelectricity for approximately 160,000 homes.

==== Niagara River Treaty ====
To preserve Niagara Falls' natural beauty, this treaty was signed on 27 February 1950 by the U.S. and Canada to limit water usage by the power plants. The treaty allows higher summertime diversion at night when tourists are fewer and during the winter months when there are even fewer tourists. It governs the use and diversion of water from the river and Falls for scenic preservation and hydroelectric power generation. This treaty, designed to ensure an "unbroken curtain of water" flowing over the falls, states that during daylight time during the tourist season (April 1 to October 31) there must be 2,800 cubic metres per second (100,000 cu ft/s) of water flowing over the falls, and during the night and off-tourist season there must be 1,400 cubic metres per second (50,000 cu ft/s) of water flowing over the falls. This treaty is monitored by the International Niagara Board of Control, using a NOAA gauging station above the falls. During winter, the Power Authority of New York works with Ontario Power Generation to prevent ice on the Niagara River from interfering with power production or causing flooding of shoreline property. One of their joint efforts is an 2,700-metre-long (8,800 ft) ice boom, which prevents the buildup of ice, yet allows water to continue flowing downstream. In addition to minimum water volume, the crest of Horseshoe falls was reduced to maintain an uninterrupted "curtain of water".

Entitled "Treaty Between Canada and the United States of America Concerning the Diversion of the Niagara River" in full, the text of the treaty contains ten articles and an addendum agreement between the government of Canada and the province of Ontario. The treaty terminates an earlier agreement between Great Britain and the United States from 1909. It was signed in Washington on February 27, 1950 by Louis St. Laurent and Stephen Woodward for Canada and the United States, respectively. Among its principal provisions, the treaty:

- Allocates water available for hydroelectric generation between Canada and the United States.
- Requires minimum flows over the Falls during daytime and tourist seasons to preserve scenic conditions.
- Authorizes greater diversion of water during nighttime and off-season periods for power generation.
- Provides for oversight and monitoring by the International Joint Commission.

=== Transport ===
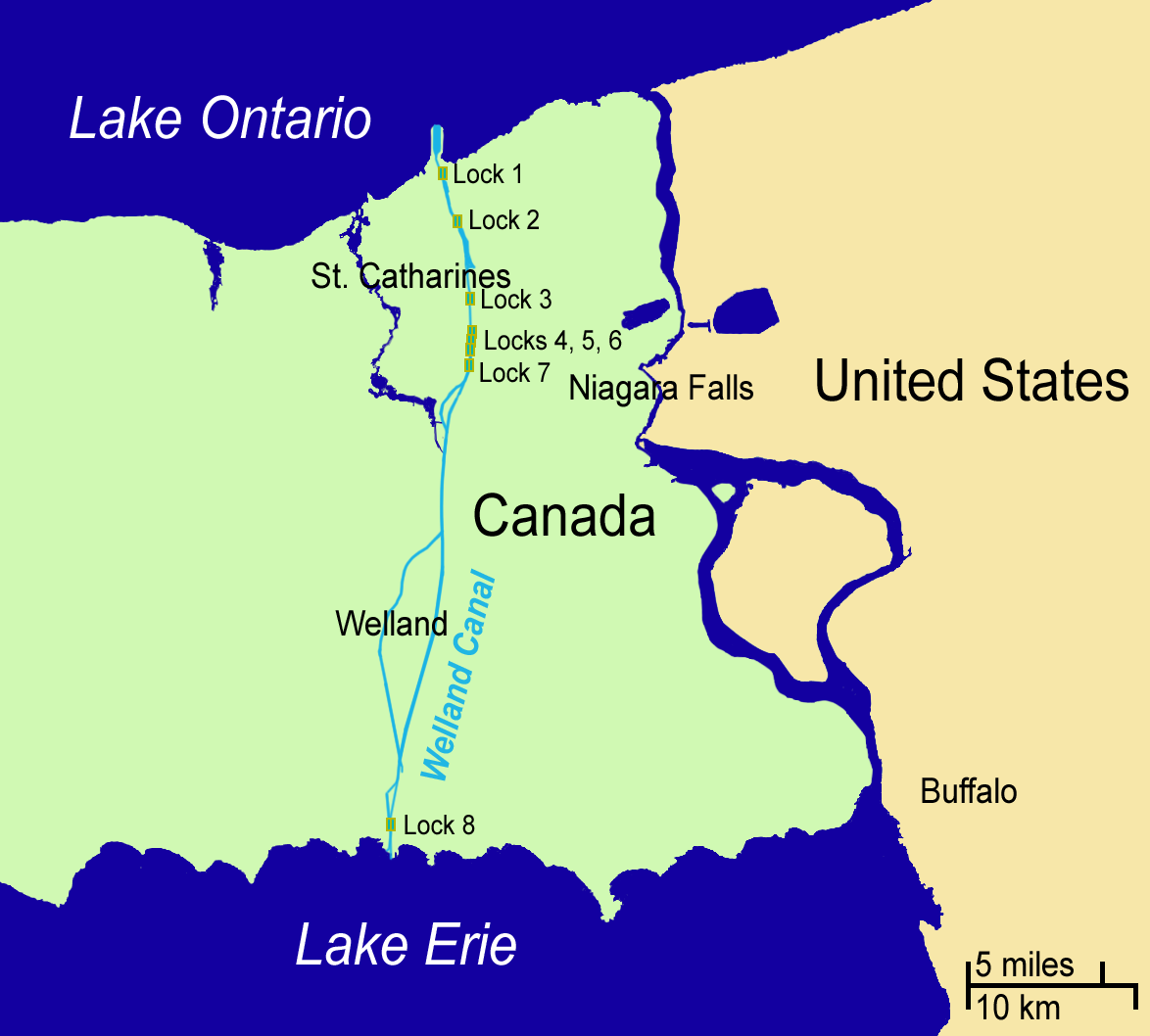
The Welland Canal connects Lake Ontario and Lake Erie through a series of eight locks, allowing ships to bypass the 51 m (167 ft) high Niagara Falls.

Ships can bypass Niagara Falls by means of the Welland Canal, which was improved and incorporated into the Saint Lawrence Seaway in the mid-1950s. While the seaway diverted water traffic from nearby Buffalo and led to the demise of its steel and grain mills, other industries in the Niagara River valley flourished with the help of the electric power produced by the river. However, since the 1970s the region has declined economically.

The cities of Niagara Falls, Ontario, Canada, and Niagara Falls, New York, United States, are connected by two international bridges. The Rainbow Bridge, just downriver from the falls, affords the closest view of the falls and is open to non-commercial vehicle traffic and pedestrians. The Whirlpool Rapids Bridge lies 1.6 kilometres (1 mi) north of the Rainbow Bridge and is the oldest bridge over the Niagara River. Nearby Niagara Falls International Airport and Buffalo Niagara International Airport were named after the waterfall, as were Niagara University, countless local businesses, and even an asteroid.

== Over the falls ==
=== Jumps, plunges and walks ===
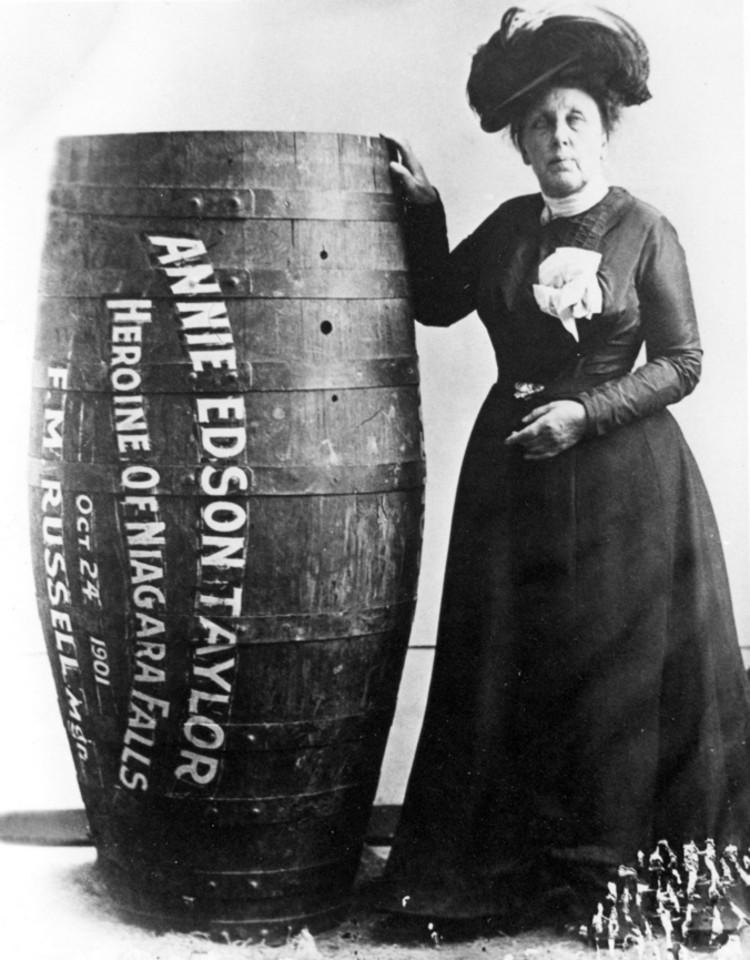
Annie Edson Taylor posing with her wooden barrel (1901)

The first recorded publicity stunt using the Falls was the wreck of the schooner Michigan in 1827. Local hotel owners acquired a former Lake Erie freighter, loaded it with animals and effigies of people, towed it to a spot above the falls and let it plunge over the brink. Admission of fifty cents was charged.

In October 1829, Sam Patch, who called himself "the Yankee Leapster", jumped from a high tower into the gorge below the falls and survived; this began a long tradition of daredevils trying to go over the falls. Englishman Captain Matthew Webb, the first man to swim the English Channel, drowned in 1883 trying to swim the rapids downriver from the falls.

On October 24, 1901, 63-year-old Michigan school teacher Annie Edson Taylor became the first person to go over the falls in a barrel as a publicity stunt; she survived, bleeding, but otherwise unharmed. Soon after exiting the barrel, she said, "No one ought ever do that again." Days before Taylor's attempt, her domestic cat was sent over the falls in her barrel to test its strength. The cat survived the plunge unharmed and later posed with Taylor in photographs. Since Taylor's historic ride, over a dozen people have intentionally gone over the falls in or on a device, despite her advice. Some have survived unharmed, but others have drowned or been severely injured. Survivors face charges and stiff fines, as it is now illegal, on both sides of the border, to attempt to go over the falls. Charles Stephens, a 58-year-old barber from Bristol, England, went over the falls in a wooden barrel in July 1920 and was the first person to die in an endeavor of this type. Bobby Leach went over Horseshoe Falls in a crude steel barrel in 1911 and needed rescuing by William "Red" Hill Sr. Hill again came to the rescue of Leach following his failed attempt to swim the Niagara Gorge in 1920. In 1928, "Smiling Jean" Lussier tried an entirely different concept, going over the falls in a large rubber ball; he was successful and survived the ordeal.

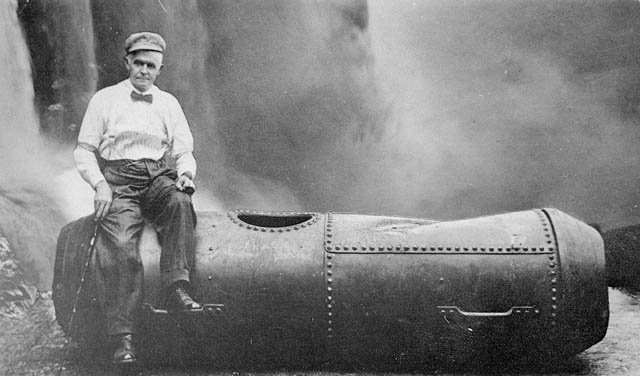
Bobby Leach and his barrel after his trip over Niagara Falls (1911 photo)

In the "Miracle at Niagara", on July 9, 1960, Roger Woodward, a seven-year-old American boy, was swept over Horseshoe Falls after the boat in which he was cruising lost power; two tourists pulled his 17-year-old sister Deanne from the river only 6 m (20 ft) from the lip of the Horseshoe Falls at Goat Island. Minutes later, Woodward was plucked from the roiling plunge pool beneath Horseshoe Falls after grabbing a life ring thrown to him by the crew of the Maid of the Mist boat. The children's uncle, Jim Honeycutt, who had been steering the boat, was swept over the edge to his death.

On July 2, 1984, Canadian Karel Soucek from Hamilton, Ontario, plunged over Horseshoe Falls in a barrel with only minor injuries. Soucek was fined $500 for performing the stunt without a license. In 1985, he was fatally injured while attempting to re-create the Niagara drop at the Houston Astrodome. His aim was to climb into a barrel hoisted to the rafters of the Astrodome and to drop 55 m (180 ft) into a water tank on the floor. After his barrel released prematurely, it hit the side of the tank, and he died the next day from his injuries.

In August 1985, Steve Trotter, an aspiring stuntman from Rhode Island, became the youngest person ever (age 22) and the first American in 25 years to go over the falls in a barrel. Ten years later, Trotter went over the falls again, becoming the second person to go over the falls twice and survive. It was also the second "duo"; Lori Martin joined Trotter for the barrel ride over the falls. They survived the fall, but their barrel became stuck at the bottom of the falls, requiring a rescue.

On September 28, 1989, Niagara natives Peter DeBernardi and Jeffery James Petkovich became the first "team" to make it over the falls in a two-person barrel. The stunt was conceived by DeBenardi, who wanted to discourage youth from following in his path of addictive drug use. The pair emerged shortly after going over with minor injuries and were charged with performing an illegal stunt under the Niagara Parks Act.

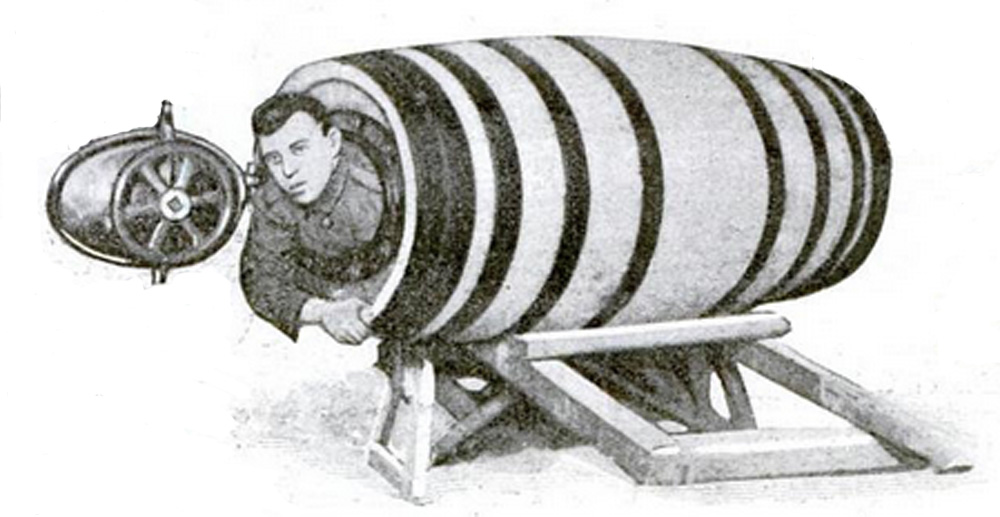
Charles Stephens in his barrel, prior to his fatal July 1920 attempt

On June 5, 1990, Jesse Sharp, a whitewater canoeist from Tennessee paddled over the falls in a closed deck canoe. He chose not to wear a helmet to make his face more visible for photographs of the event. He also did not wear a life vest because he believed it would hinder his escape from the hydraulics at the base of the falls. His boat flushed out of the falls, but his body was never found. On September 27, 1993, John "David" Munday, of Caistor Centre, Ontario, completed his second journey over the falls. On October 1, 1995, Robert Overacker went over the falls on a Jet Ski to raise awareness for the homeless. His rocket-propelled parachute failed to open and he plunged to his death. Overacker's body was recovered before he was pronounced dead at Niagara General Hospital.

On March 19, 2003 a man named Michael became noteworthy for standing unaided in the current of the Niagara river, at the precipice of Horseshoe falls, for over two hours. He was spotted just after 5pm near Terrapin Pointe. Rescue workers struggled to extract him, due to updrafts from the falls fouling approaches by helicopter, and a lack of any available places to anchor a rope in the snow covered banks of Goat Island. Eventually, a life preserver was lowered close enough for him to grab, allowing him to be pulled from the falls without going over completely. Officials refused to confirm whether the incident was caused by an aborted suicide attempt or by accident.

Kirk Jones of Canton, Michigan, became the first known person to survive a plunge over Horseshoe Falls without a flotation device on October 20, 2003. According to some reports, Jones had attempted to commit suicide, but he survived the fall with only battered ribs, scrapes, and bruises. Jones tried going over the falls again in 2017, using a large inflatable ball, but died in the process. Later reports revealed that Jones had arranged for a friend to shoot video clips of his stunt.

On March 11, 2009, a man survived an unprotected trip over Horseshoe Falls. When rescued from the river he suffered from severe hypothermia and a large wound to his head. His identity was never released. Eyewitnesses reported seeing the man intentionally enter the water. On May 21, 2012, an unidentified man became the fourth person to survive an unprotected trip over Horseshoe Falls. Eyewitness reports show he "deliberately jumped" into the Niagara River after climbing over a railing. On July 8, 2019, at roughly 4 am, officers responded to a report of a person in crisis at the brink of the Canadian side of the falls. Once officers got to the scene, the man climbed the retaining wall, jumped into the river and went over Horseshoe Falls. Authorities subsequently began to search the lower Niagara River basin, where the man was found alive but injured sitting on the rocks at the water's edge.

=== Tightrope walkers ===
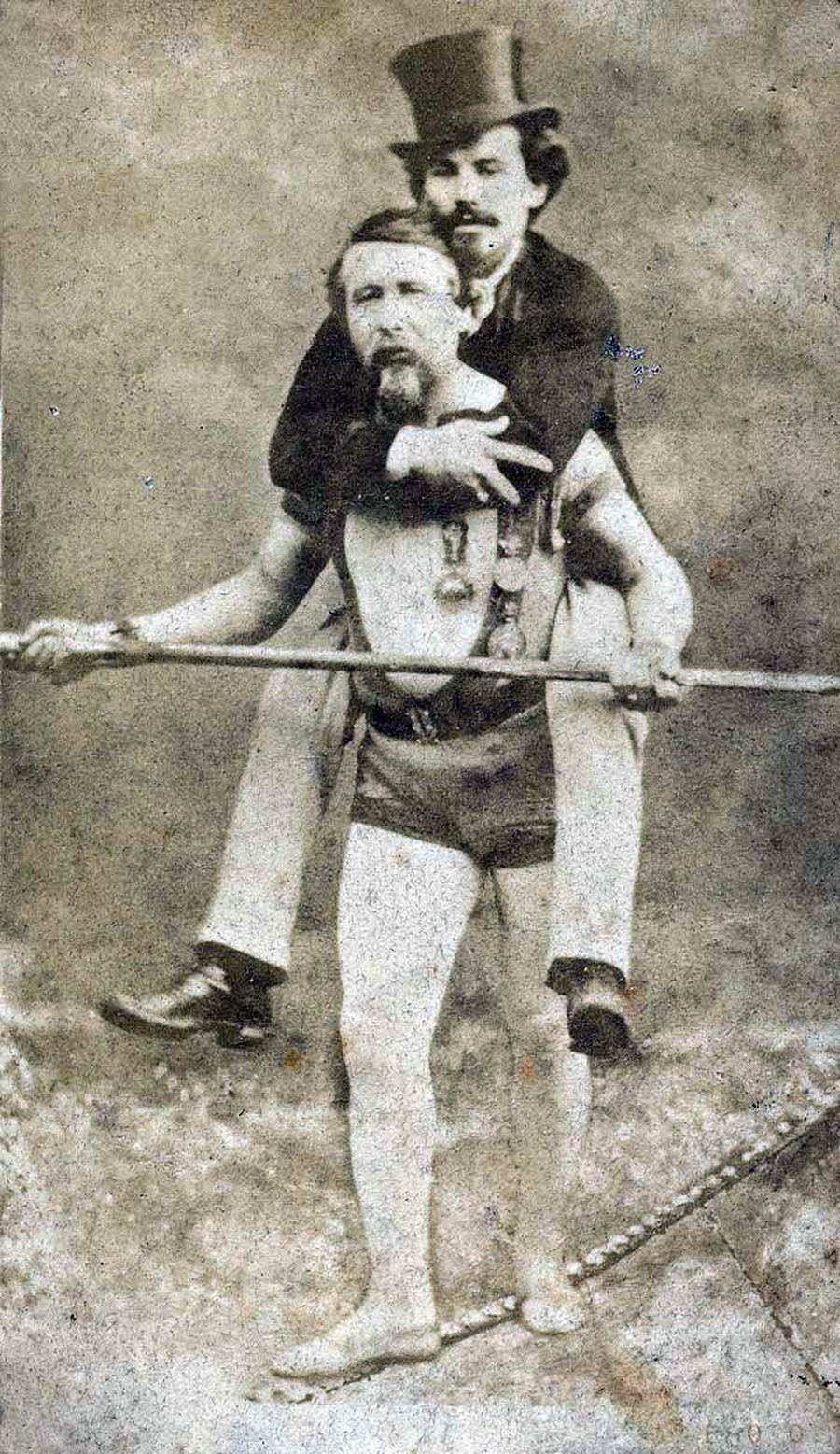
Blondin carrying his manager, Harry Colcord, on a tightrope

Tightrope walkers drew huge crowds to witness their exploits. Their wires ran across the gorge, near the current Rainbow Bridge, not over the waterfall. Jean François "Blondin" Gravelet was the first to cross Niagara Gorge on June 30, 1859, and did so again eight times that year. His most difficult crossing occurred on August 14, when he carried his manager, Harry Colcord, on his back. His final crossing, on September 8, 1860, was witnessed by the Prince of Wales. Author Ginger Strand argues that these performances may have had symbolic meanings at the time relating to slavery and abolition.

Maria Spelterini, a 23-year-old Italian was the first and only woman to cross the Niagara River gorge; she did so on a tightrope on July 8, 1876. She repeated the stunt several times during the same month. During one crossing she was blindfolded and during another, her ankles and wrists were handcuffed. On July 12, she crossed wearing peach baskets strapped to her feet.

Among the many competitors was Ontario's William Hunt, who billed himself as "The Great Farini"; his first crossing was in 1860. Farini competed with Blondin in performing outrageous stunts over the gorge. On August 8, 1864, however, an attempt failed and he needed to be rescued.

On June 15, 2012, high wire artist Nik Wallenda became the first person to walk across the falls area in 116 years, after receiving special permission from both governments. The full length of his tightrope was 550 metres (1,800 ft). Wallenda crossed near the brink of Horseshoe Falls, unlike walkers who had crossed farther downstream. According to Wallenda, it was the longest unsupported tightrope walk in history. He carried his passport on the trip and was required to present it upon arrival on the Canadian side of the falls.

=== Fish ===
According to river expert Wes Hill, 90% of fish that go over the falls survive.

== Tourism ==
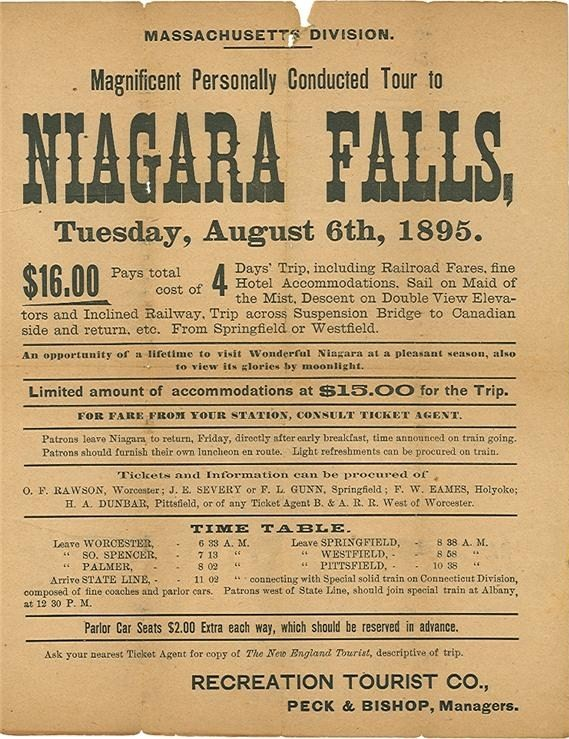
Advertising broadside for trip to Niagara Falls from Massachusetts, 1895

Niagara Falls receives over 20 million visitors annually, with summer as the peak period. It is both a daytime and evening attraction. From the Canadian side, floodlights illuminate both sides of the falls for several hours after dusk.

The oldest and best known tourist attraction at Niagara Falls is the Maid of the Mist boat cruise, named for an alleged ancient Ongiara Indian mythical character, which has carried passengers into the rapids immediately below the falls since 1846. Cruise boats operate from boat docks on both sides of the falls, with the Maid of the Mist operating from the American side and Hornblower Cruises (originally Maid of the Mist until 2014) from the Canadian side. In 1996, Native American groups threatened to boycott the boat companies if they would not stop playing what they said was a fake story on their boats. The Maid of the Mist dropped the audio.

From the U.S. side, American Falls can be viewed from walkways along Prospect Point Park, which also features the Prospect Point Observation Tower and a boat dock for the Maid of the Mist. Goat Island offers more views of the falls and is accessible by foot and automobile traffic by bridge above American Falls. From Goat Island, the Cave of the Winds is accessible by elevator and leads hikers to a point beneath Bridal Veil Falls. Also on Goat Island are the Three Sisters Islands, the Power Portal where a statue of Nikola Tesla (the inventor whose patents for the AC induction motor and other devices for AC power transmission helped make the harnessing of the falls possible) can be seen, and a walking path that enables views of the rapids, the Niagara River, the gorge, and all of the falls. Most of these attractions lie within the Niagara Falls State Park.

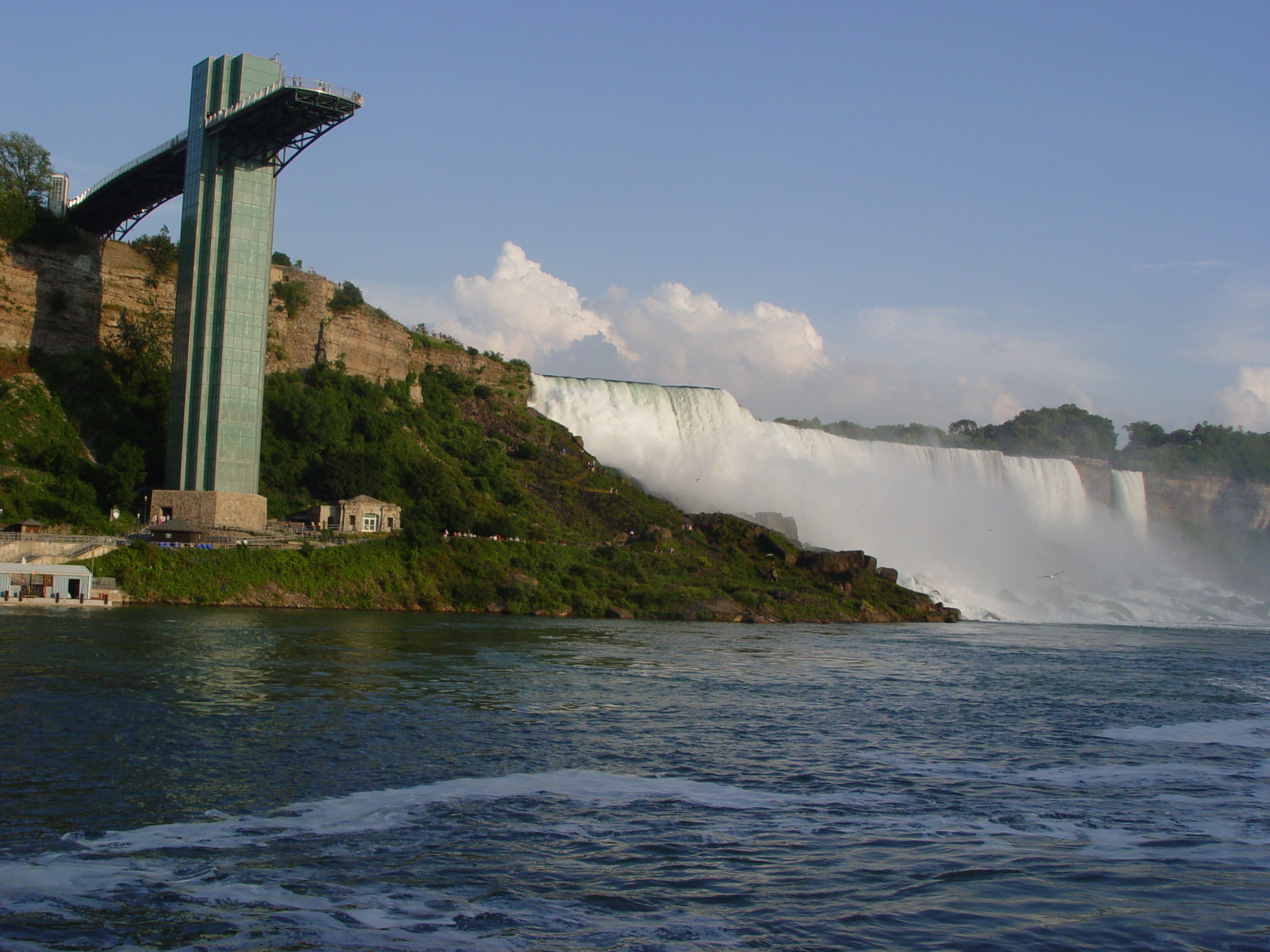
Prospect Point Observation Tower (also known as the Niagara Falls Observation Tower)

The Niagara Scenic Trolley offers guided trips along American Falls and around Goat Island. Panoramic and aerial views of the falls can also be viewed by helicopter. The Niagara Gorge Discovery Center showcases the natural and local history of Niagara Falls and the Niagara Gorge. A casino and luxury hotel was opened in Niagara Falls, New York, by the Seneca Indian tribe. The Seneca Niagara Casino & Hotel occupies the former Niagara Falls Convention Center. The new hotel is the first addition to the city's skyline since completion of the United Office Building in the 1920s.

On the Canadian side, Queen Victoria Park features manicured gardens, platforms offering views of American, Bridal Veil, and Horseshoe Falls, and underground walkways leading into observation rooms that yield the illusion of being within the falling waters. Along the Niagara River, the Niagara River Recreational Trail runs 56 km (35 mi) from Fort Erie to Fort George, and includes many historical sites from the War of 1812.

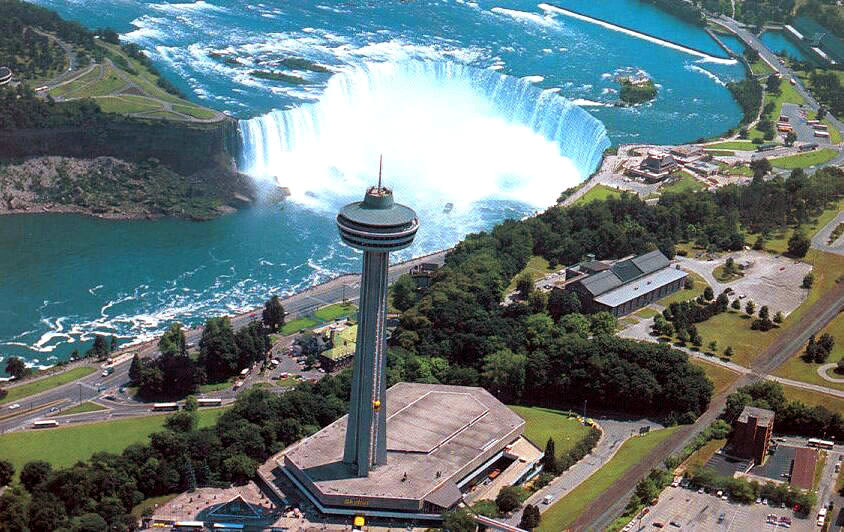
Skylon Tower as seen from a helicopter on the Canadian side

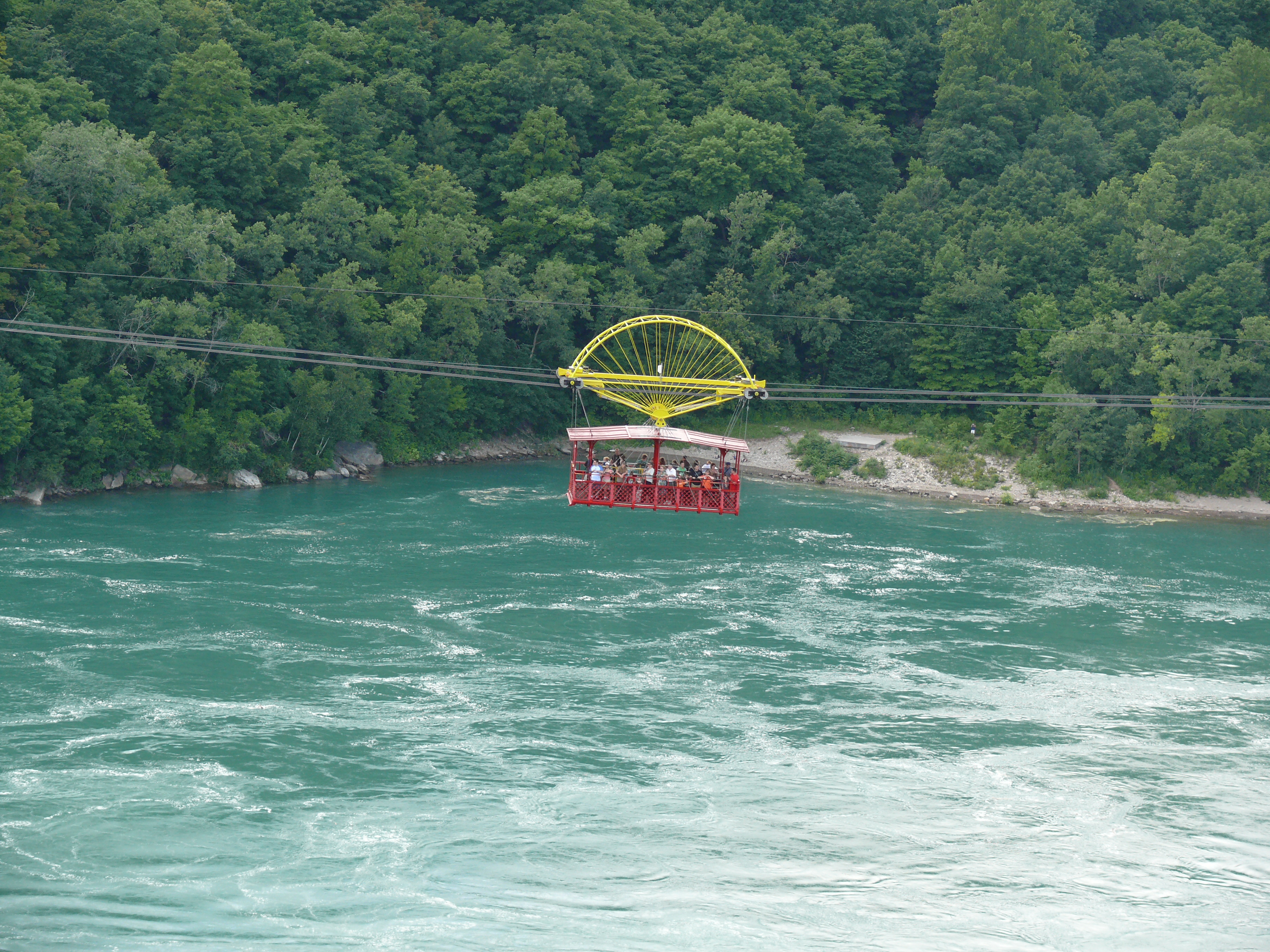
Whirlpool Aero Car above Niagara River whirlpool

The observation deck of the nearby Skylon Tower offers the highest view of the falls, and in the opposite direction gives views as far as Toronto. Along with the Tower Hotel (built as the Seagrams Tower, later renamed the Heritage Tower, the Royal Inn Tower, the Royal Center Tower, the Panasonic Tower, the Minolta Tower, and most recently the Konica Minolta Tower before receiving its current name in 2010), it is one of two towers in Canada with a view of the falls. The Whirlpool Aero Car, built in 1916 from a design by Spanish engineer Leonardo Torres Quevedo, is a cable car that takes passengers over the Niagara Whirlpool on the Canadian side. The Journey Behind the Falls consists of an observation platform and series of tunnels near the bottom of the Horseshoe Falls on the Canadian side. There are two casinos on the Canadian side of Niagara Falls, the Niagara Fallsview Casino Resort and Casino Niagara.

Touring by helicopter over the falls, from both the US and the Canadian side, was described by The New York Times as still popular a year after a serious crash. Although The New York Times had long before described attempting to tour the falls as "bent on suicide" and despite a number of fatal crashes, the "as many as 100 eight-minute rides each day" are hard to regulate; two countries and various government agencies would have to coordinate. These flights have been available "since the early 1960s".

== Media ==
=== Movies and television ===
Already a huge tourist attraction and favorite spot for honeymooners, Niagara Falls visits rose sharply in 1953 after the release of Niagara, a movie starring Marilyn Monroe and Joseph Cotten. The 1956 animated short Niagara Fools featured Woody Woodpecker attempting to go over the falls in a barrel. The falls was a featured location in the major motion picture Superman II in 1980 and was the subject of a popular IMAX movie, Niagara: Miracles, Myths and Magic. Illusionist David Copperfield performed a trick in which he appeared to travel over Horseshoe Falls in 1990.

The falls, or more particularly, the tourist-supported complex near the falls, was the setting of the short-lived Canadian-shot U.S. television show Wonderfalls in early 2004. Location footage of the falls was shot in October 2006 to portray "World's End" of the movie Pirates of the Caribbean: At World's End. Professional kayaker Rafa Ortiz's preparation to paddle over the falls in a kayak is documented in the 2015 film Chasing Niagara.

Kevin McMahon's 1991 documentary film The Falls explored the place of Niagara Falls in the world's collective imagination, covering both positive and negative aspects of the culture around the falls.

=== Literature ===
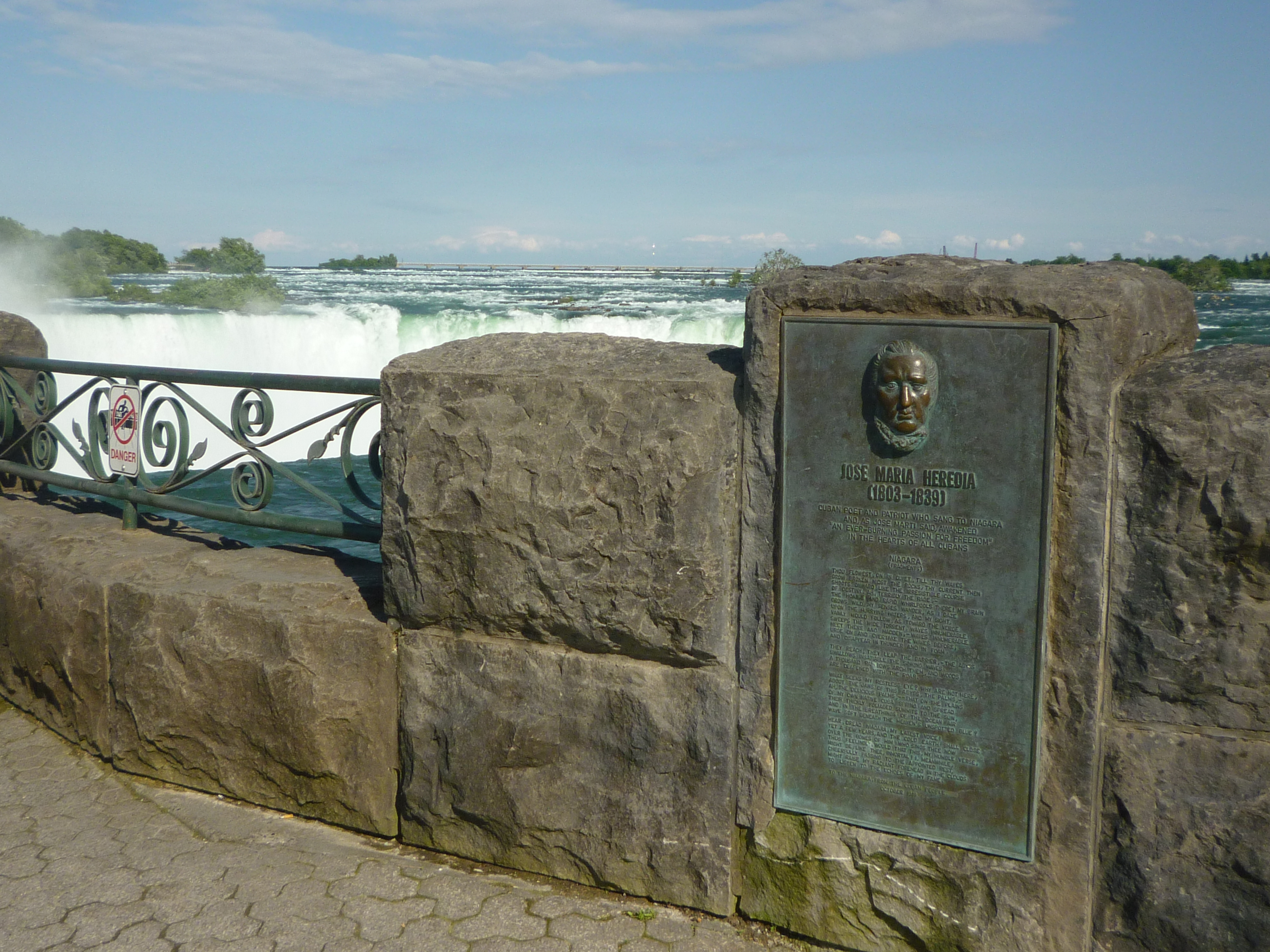
José María Heredia y Heredia plaque at Table Rock

The Niagara Falls area features as the base camp for a German aerial invasion of the United States in the H. G. Wells novel The War in the Air. Many poets have been inspired to write about the falls. Among them was the Cuban poet José Maria Heredia, who wrote the poem "Niagara". There are commemorative plaques on both sides of the falls recognizing the poem. In 1818, American poet John Neal published the poem Battle of Niagara, which is considered the best poetic description of Niagara Falls up to that time. In 1835, as a poetical illustration "The Indian Girl" to accompany a plate of the Horse-Shoe Falls—artist Thomas Allom, Letitia Elizabeth Landon imagines an Indian girl who, having saved the life of a captured young European man, takes him as her husband only to be later abandoned by him. In her despair she guides her canoe over the falls in dramatic fashion: "Upright, within that slender boat, they saw the pale girl stand, her dark hair streaming far behind—uprais'd her desperate hand."

Lydia Sigourney wrote two dramatic poems on the falls, Niagara, in 1836 and again in her Scenes in my native Land, Niagara, in 1845. In 1848, the Rev. C. H. A. Bulkley, of Mount Morris, New York, published Niagara: A Poem, a 132-page, 3,600 line blank verse poem presenting the wonders of the falls as "the theme of a single poem."

In 1893, Mark Twain wrote a satirical sketch called "The First Authentic Mention of Niagara Falls", in which Adam and Eve are living at the Falls.

=== Music ===
Composer Ferde Grofé was commissioned by the Niagara Falls Power Generation project in 1960 to compose the Niagara Falls Suite in honor of the completion of the first stage of hydroelectric work at the falls. In 1997, composer Michael Daugherty composed Niagara Falls, a piece for concert band inspired by the falls.

== Fine art ==
Niagara Falls was such an attraction to landscape artists that, writes John Howat, they were "the most popular, the most often treated, and the tritest single item of subject matter to appear in eighteenth- and nineteenth-century European and American landscape painting". Author Ginger Strand states that "Every time there was an advance in picture-making, folks raced to the Falls to try it out." She cites engravings, chromolithographs, photographs, panoramas, camera obscuras, early movies, Cinerama, and IMAX technologies as examples.

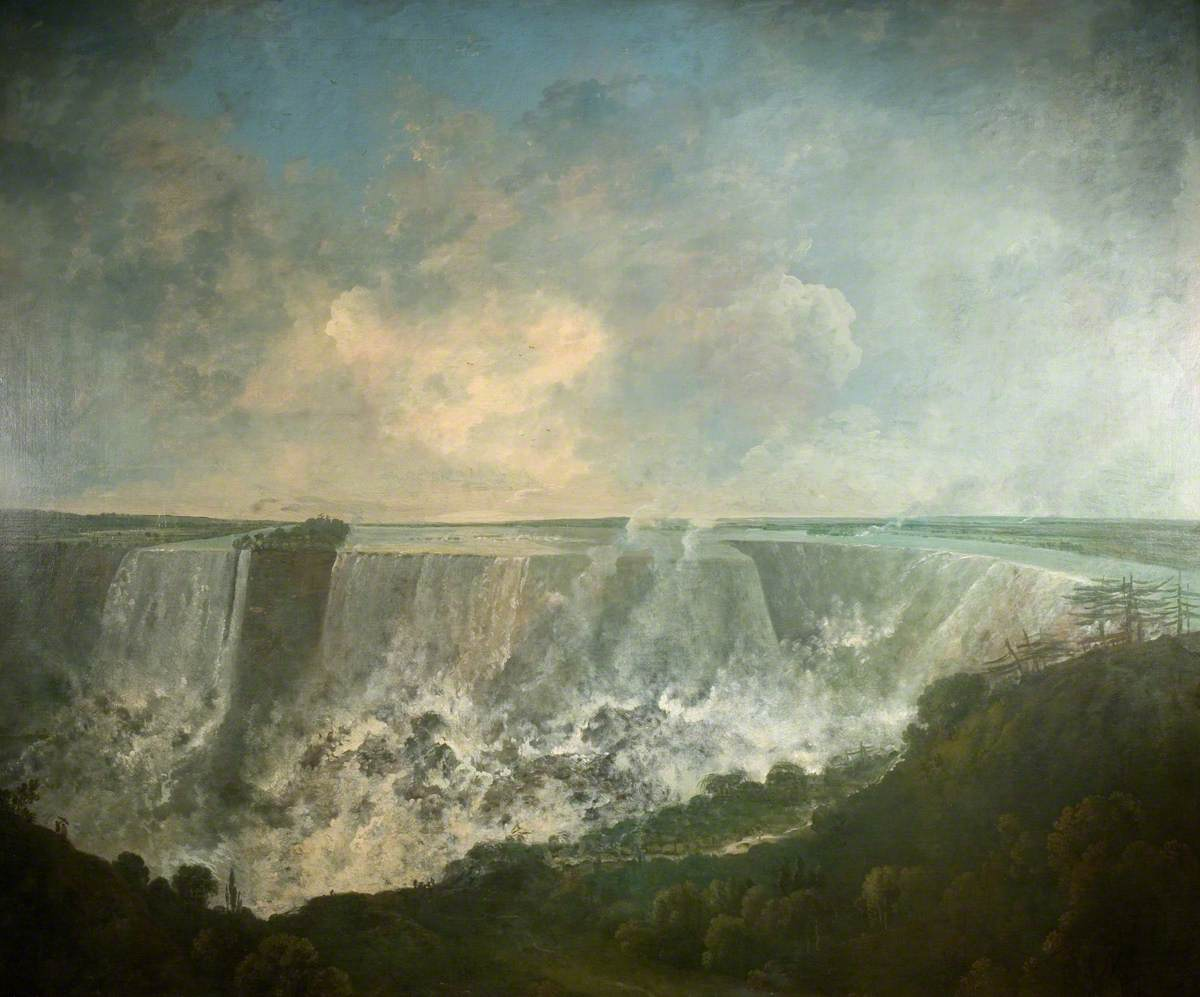
Falls of Niagara by Richard Wilson, 1774

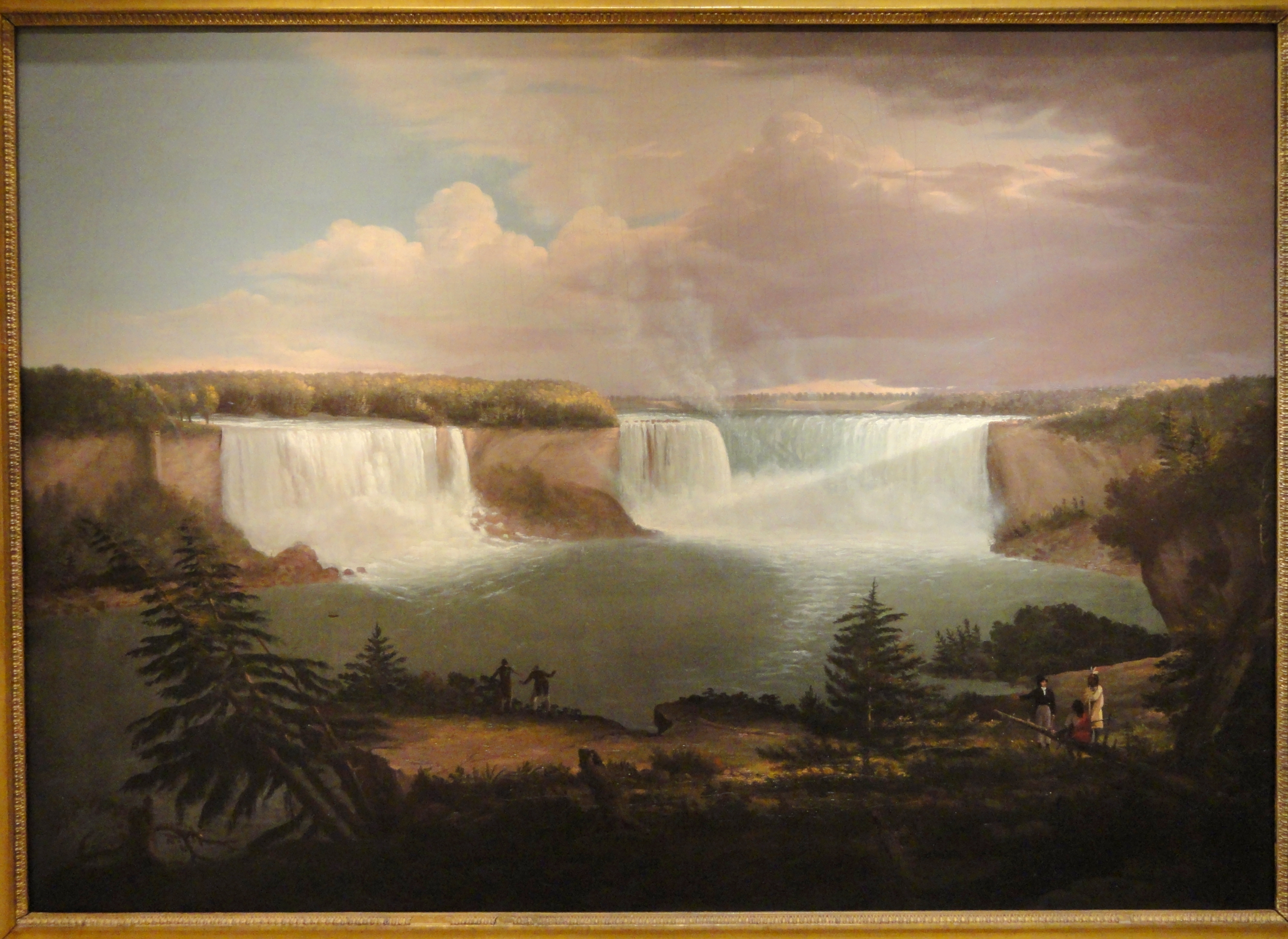
A General View of the Falls of Niagara by Alvan Fisher, 1820

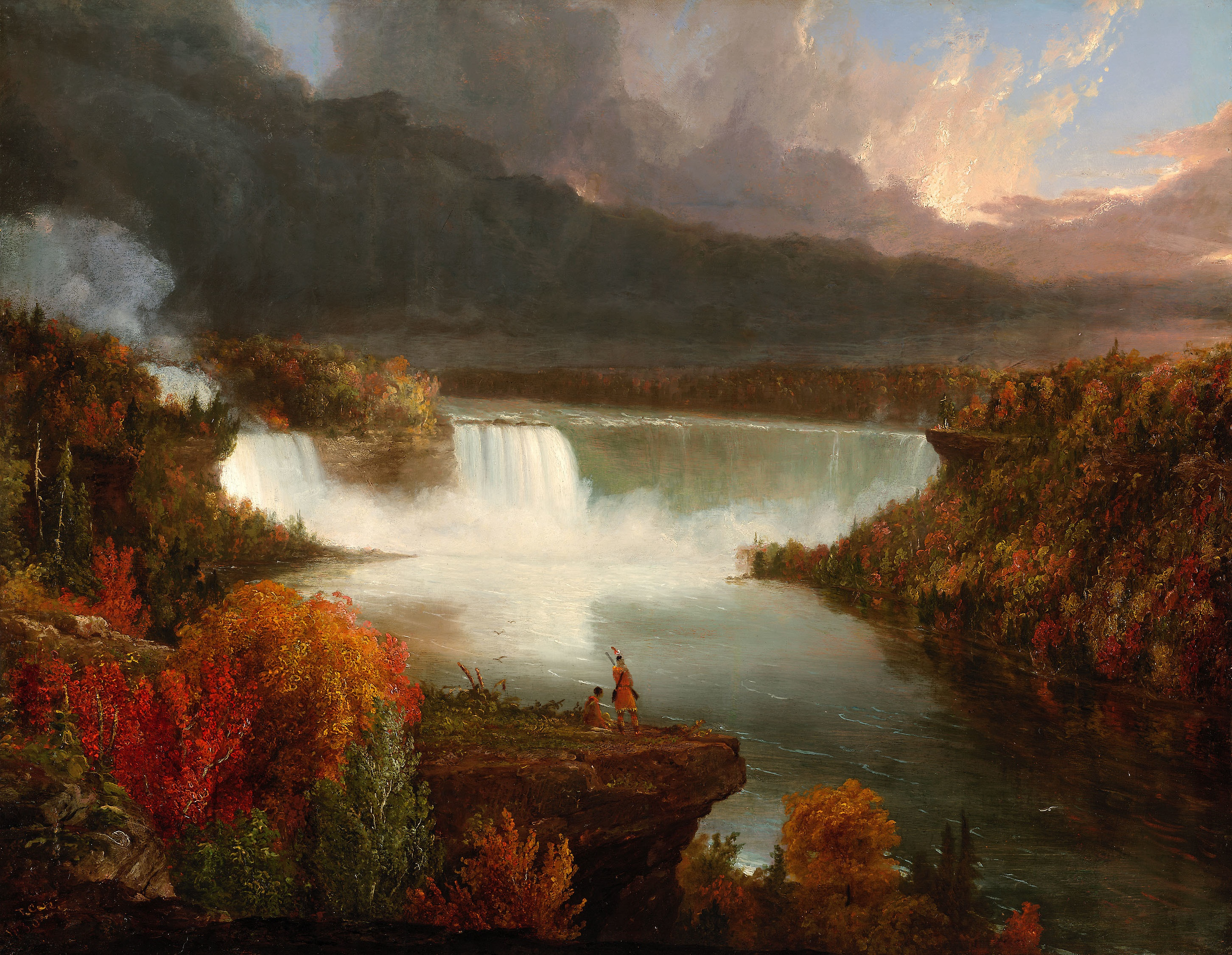
Distant View of Niagara Falls by Thomas Cole, 1830

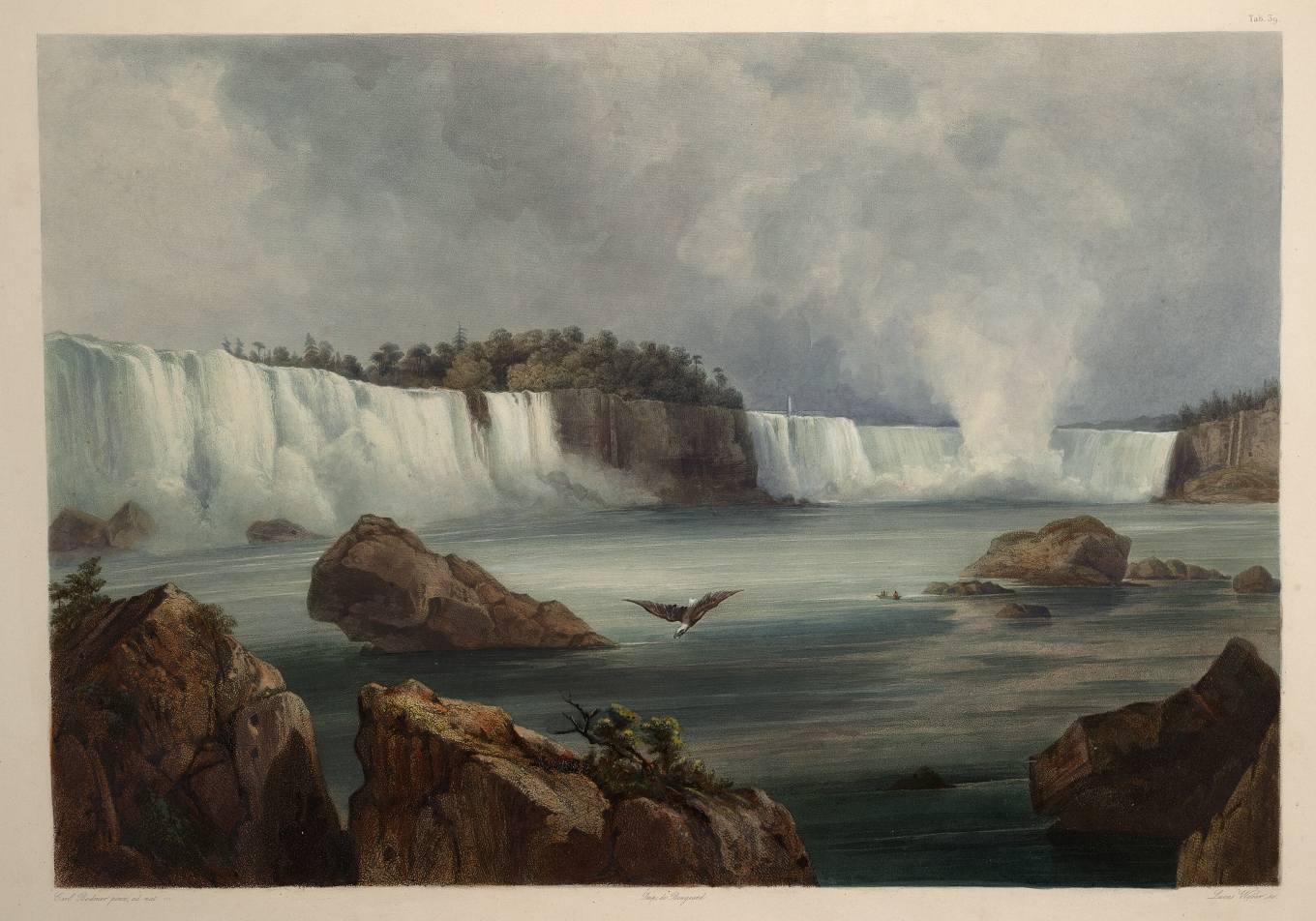
Niagara Fälle. Les chûtes du Niagara. Niagara Falls by Karl Bodmer, c. 1832

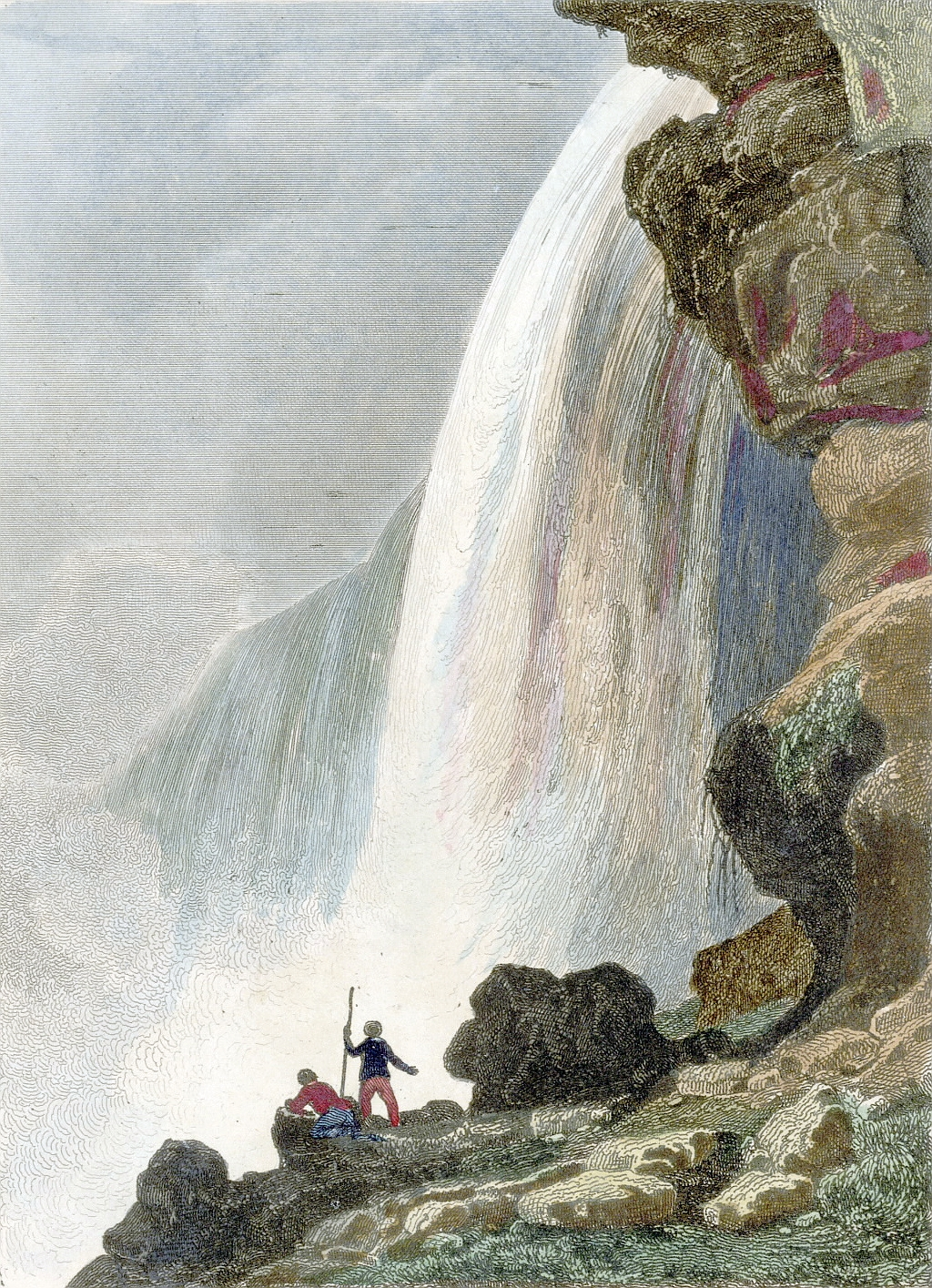
Voute sous la Chute du Niagara – Niagara Falls, Jacques-Hippolyte van der Burch, c. 1841

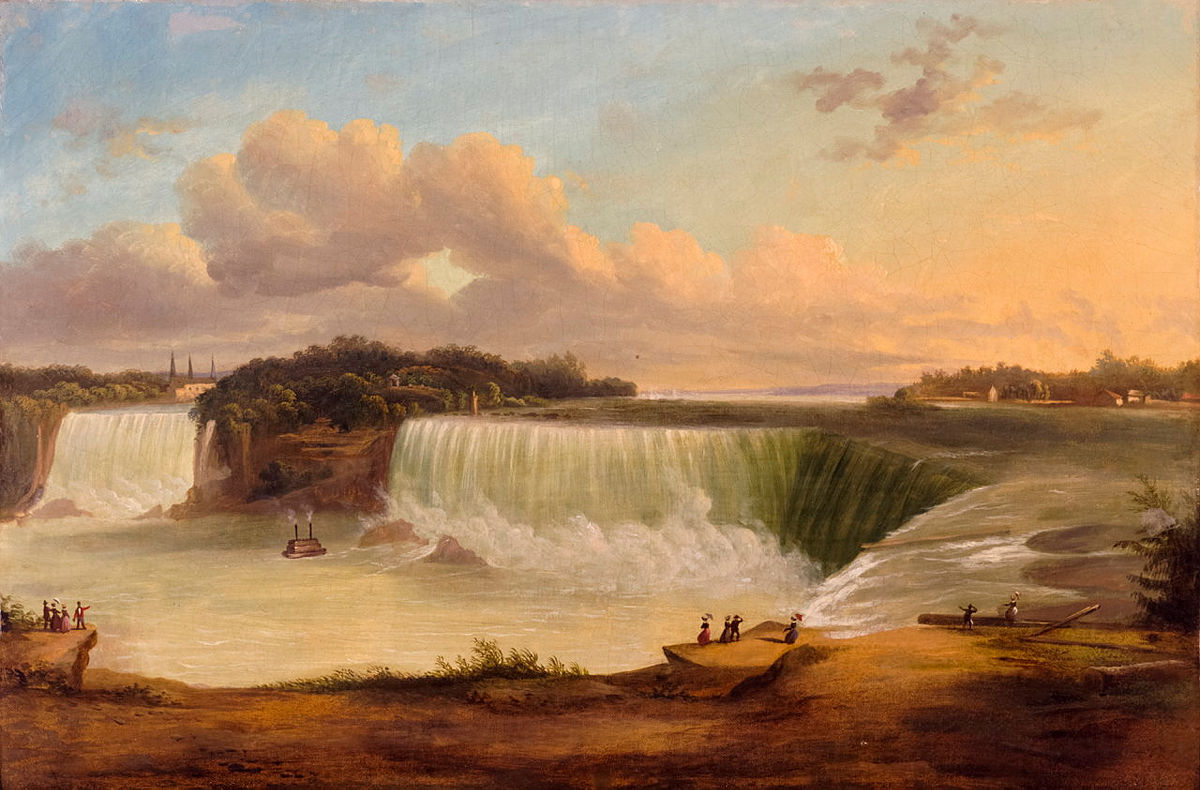
As seen from the Canadian side, by Victor de Grailly, 1845

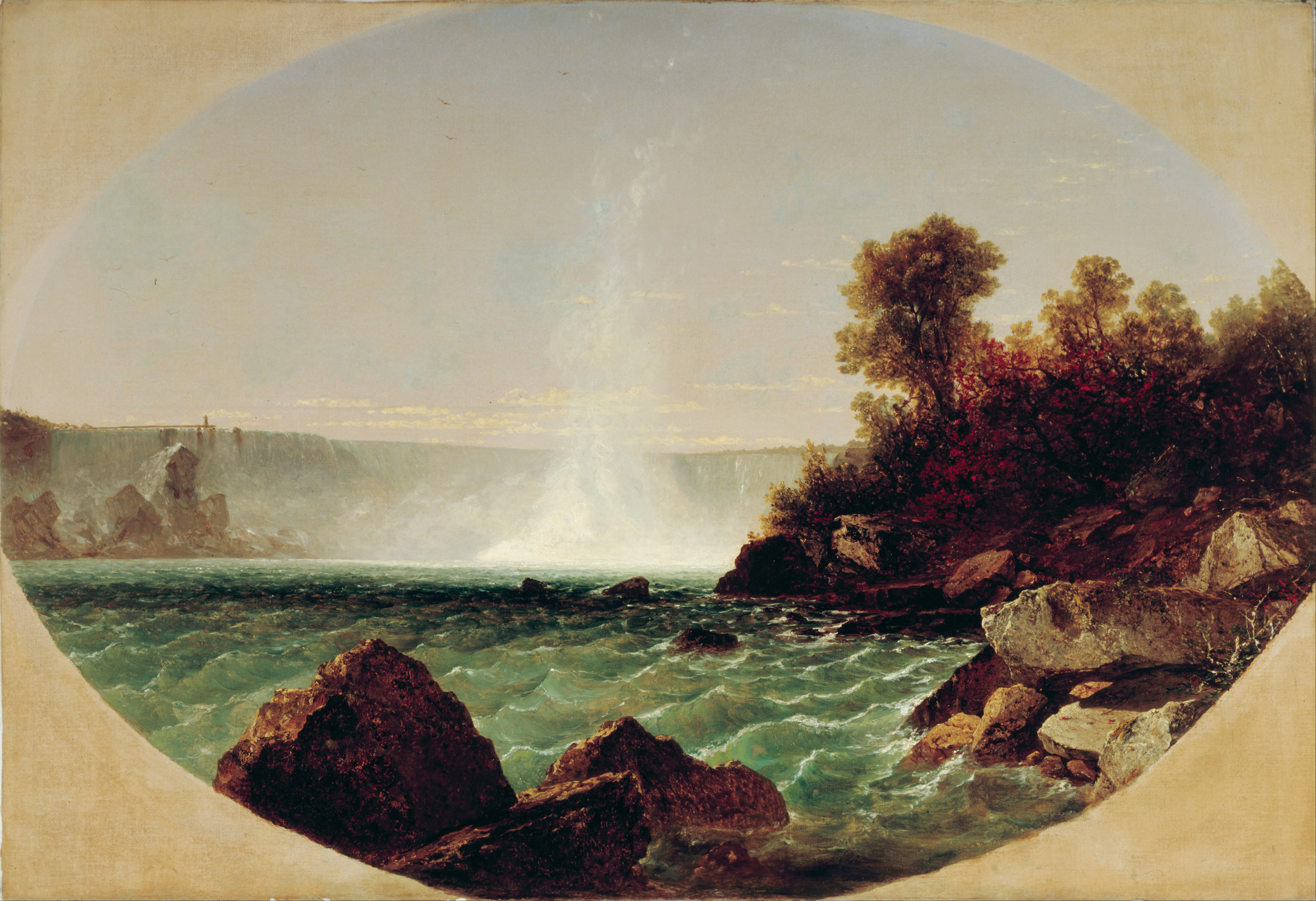
Niagara Falls by John Frederick Kensett, c. 1852-1854

Niagara by Frederic Edwin Church, 1857

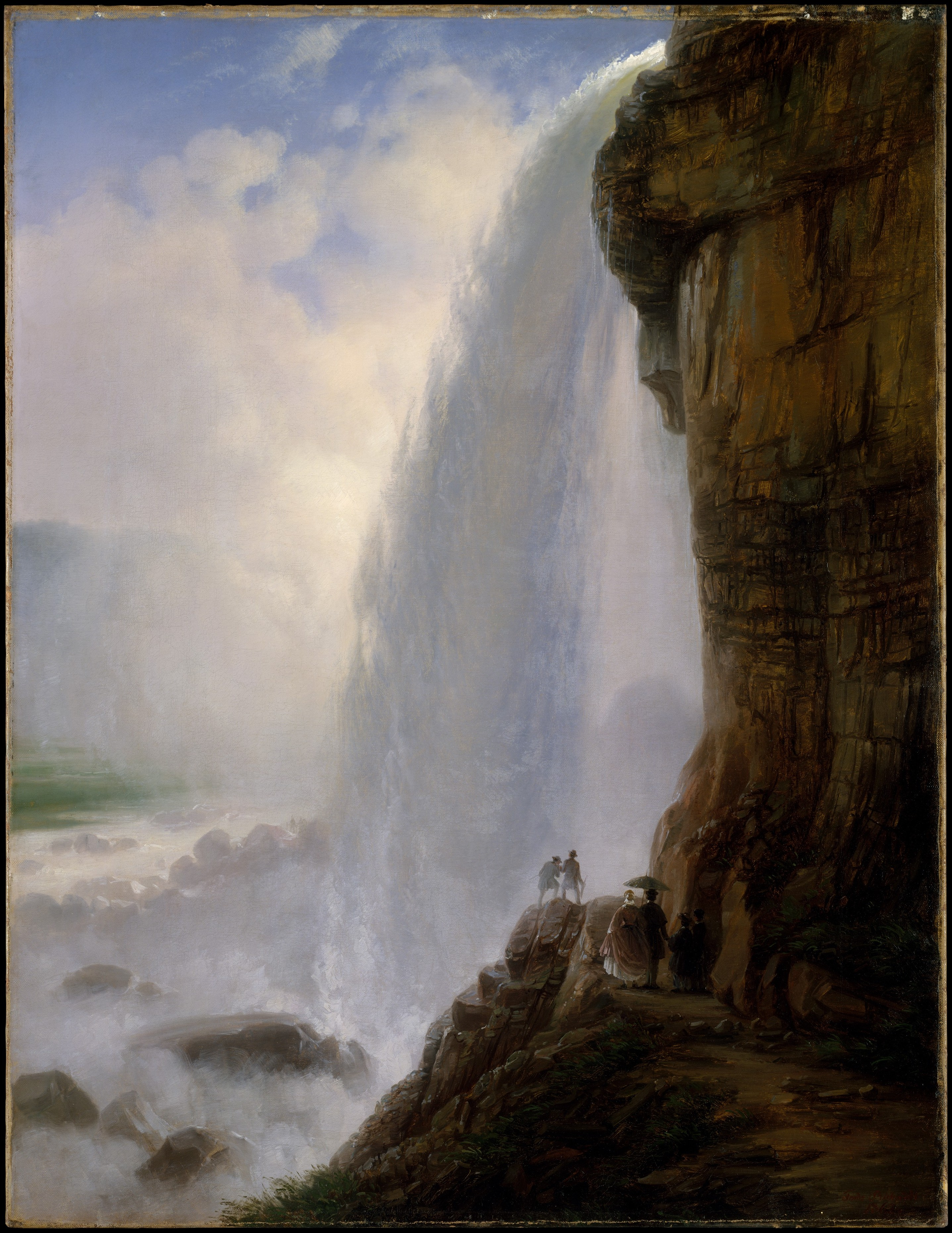
Underneath Niagara Falls by Ferdinand Richardt, 1862

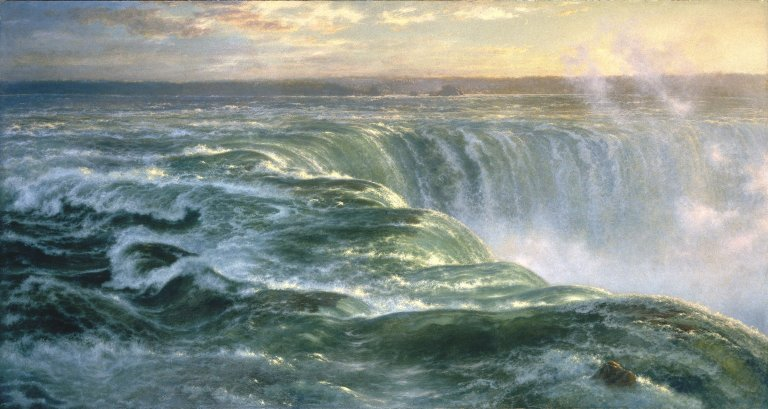
Niagara by Louis Rémy Mignot, c. 1866

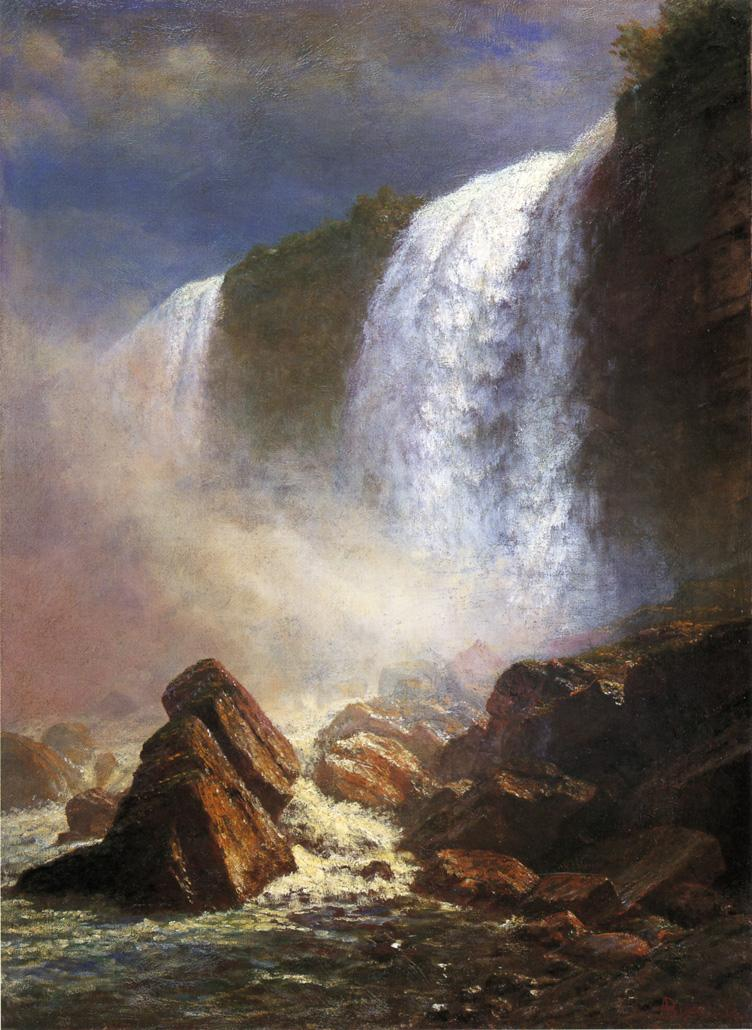
Falls of Niagara from Below by Albert Bierstadt, 1869

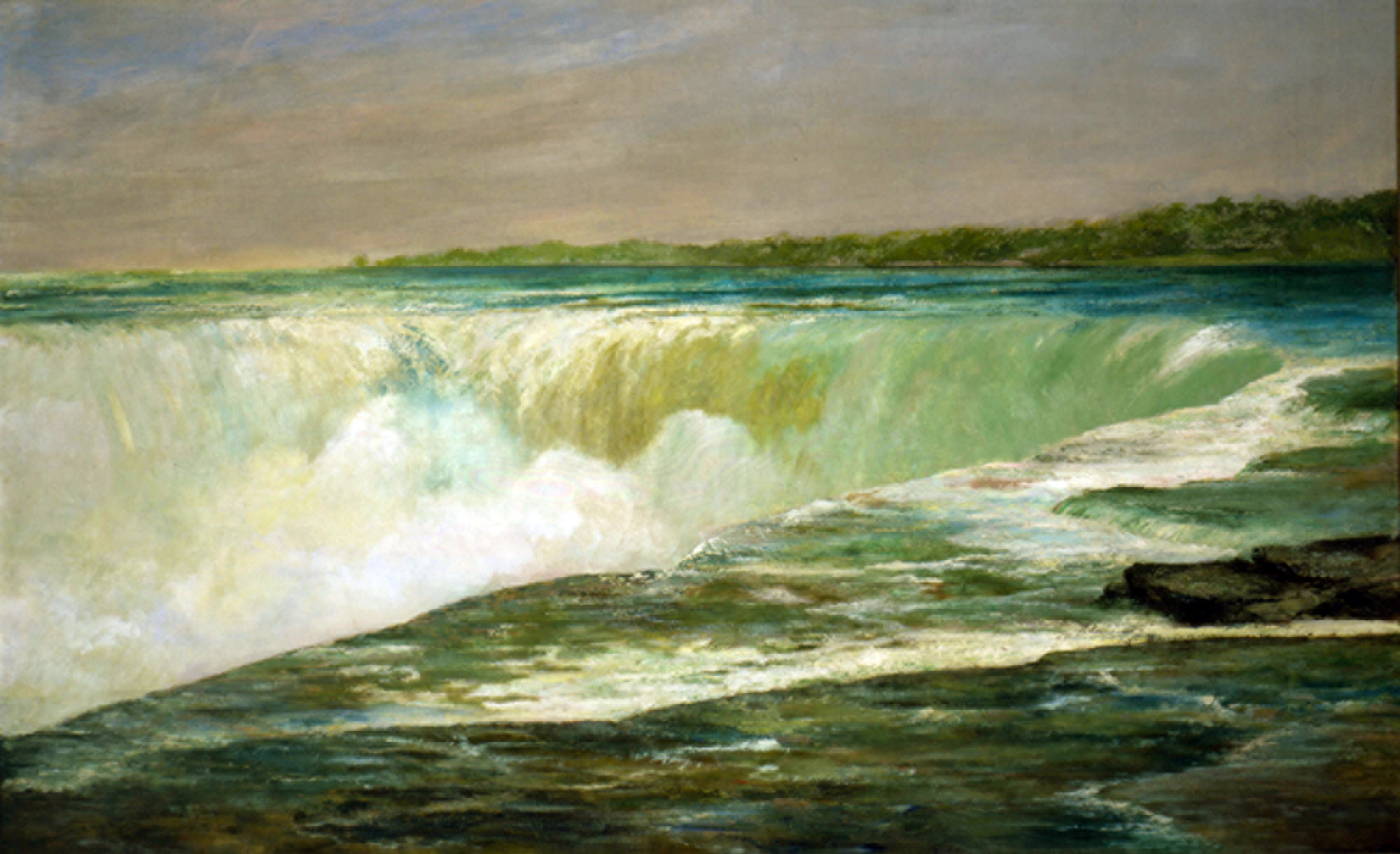
Niagara Falls by William Morris Hunt, 1878

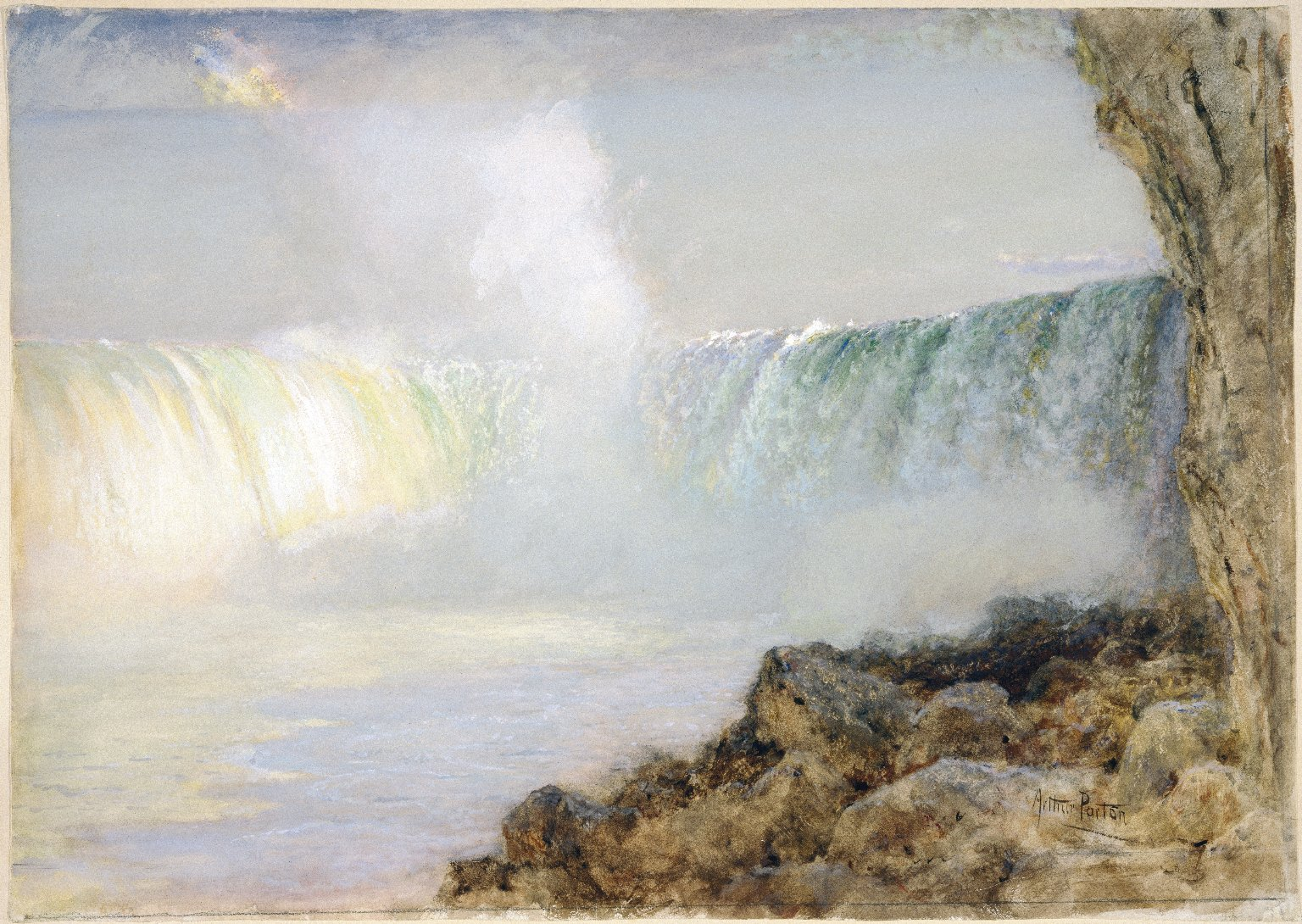
Niagara Falls, Arthur Parton c.1880

== Panoramic views ==
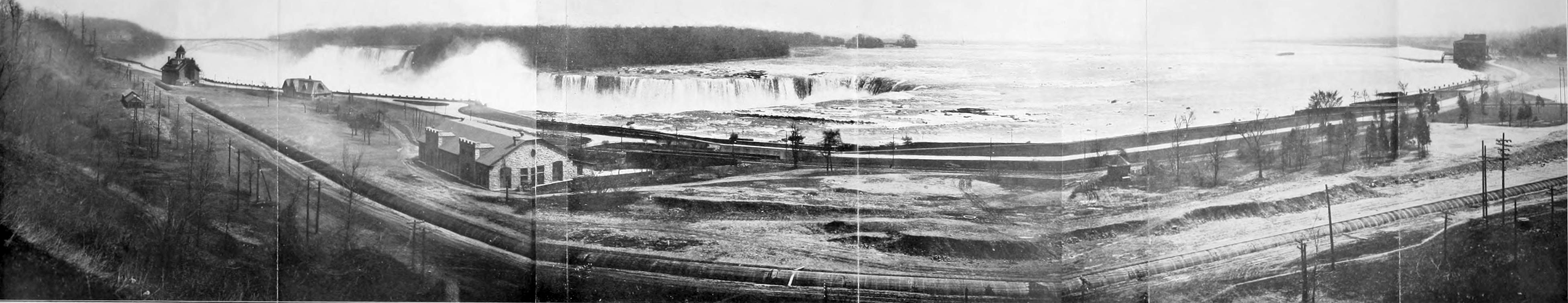
Niagara Falls, c. 1921
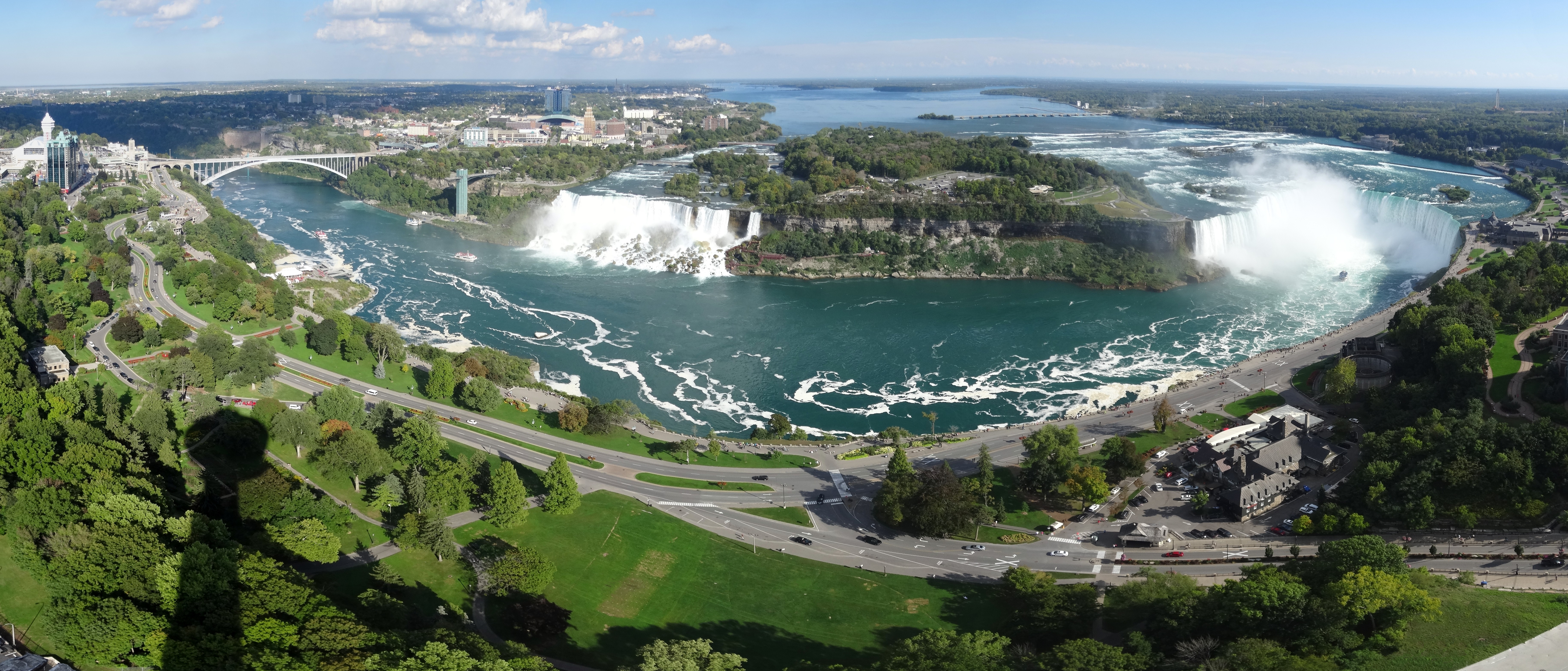
Rainbow bridge, the American, Bridal Veil, and Horseshoe Falls as seen from the Skylon Tower in 2016

== See also ==
- List of waterfalls
- List of waterfalls of Canada
- Federal Power Commission v. Tuscarora Indian Nation
- International Control Dam – Dam on the Niagara River
- Incline railways at Niagara Falls
- Table Rock, Niagara Falls – Former rock formation
