= Niagara River =

River in New York, United States and Ontario, Canada

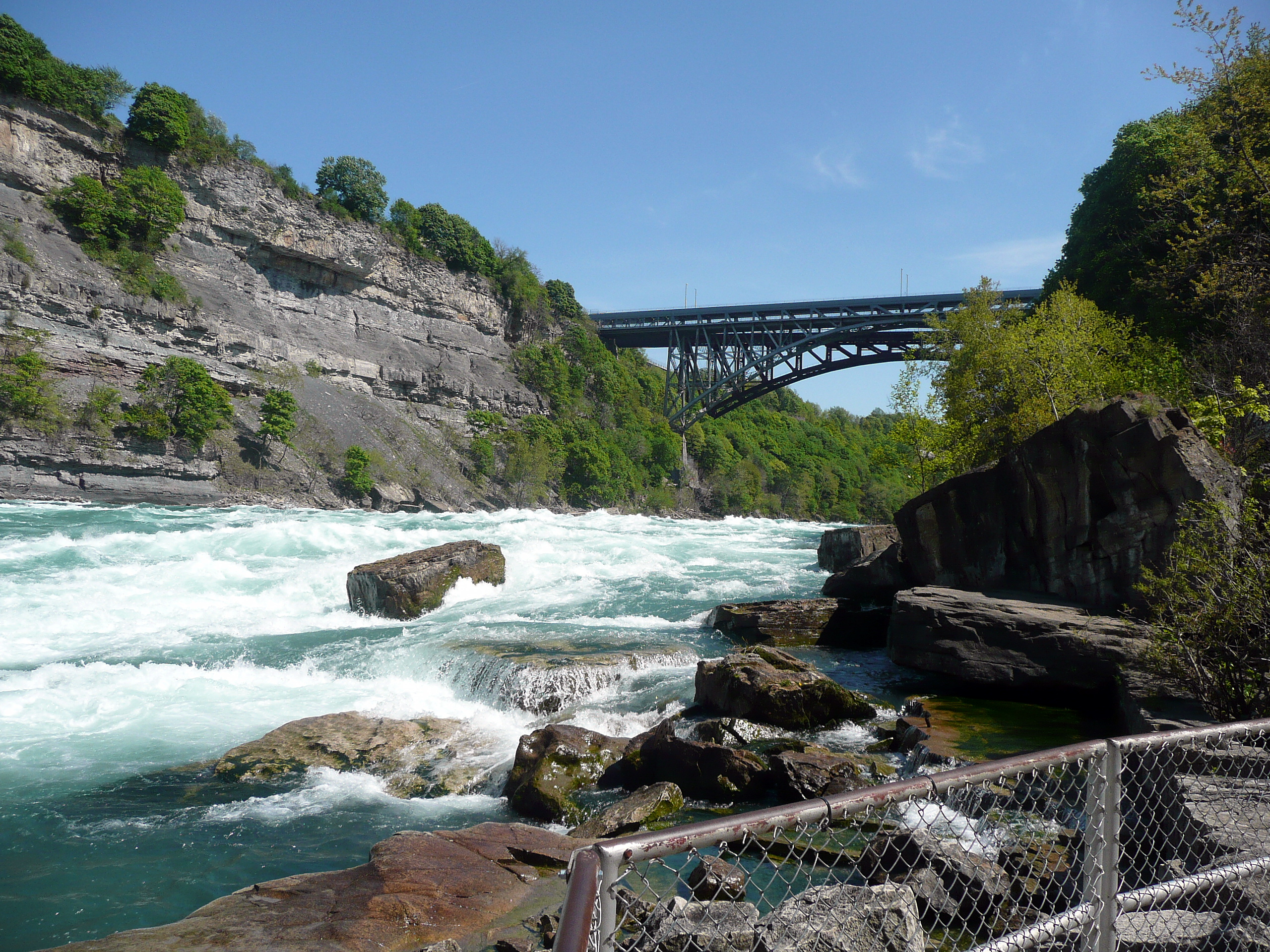
- The Niagara River at Niagara Gorge in May 2008

- Location within North America Location within Southern Ontario Location within New York

Location
- Countries: Canada; United States
- Province / State: Ontario; New York

Physical characteristics
- Source: Lake Erie
  - coordinates: 42°53′3″N 78°54′51″W
  - elevation: 173.43 m (569 ft)
- Mouth: Lake Ontario
  - coordinates: 43°15′45″N 79°04′12″W
  - elevation: 74.1 m (243 ft)
- Length: 58 km (36 mi)
- Basin size: 684,000 km^{2} (264,000 mi^{2})
- Discharge
  - location: Near mouth
  - average: 5,796–5,885 m^{3}/s (204,700–207,800 cu ft/s)
- Discharge
  - location: Buffalo
  - average: (1900–2019)5,959 m^{3}/s (210,400 cu ft/s)
  - minimum: 1,802 m^{3}/s (63,600 cu ft/s)
  - maximum: 7,761 m^{3}/s (274,100 cu ft/s)

Basin features
- Progression: Lake Ontario→ Saint Lawrence River→ Gulf of Saint Lawrence
- River system: St. Lawrence River
- Tributaries
  - left: Welland
  - right: Tonawanda Creek

Ramsar Wetland
- Official name: Niagara River Corridor
- Designated: October 3, 2019
- Reference no.: 2402

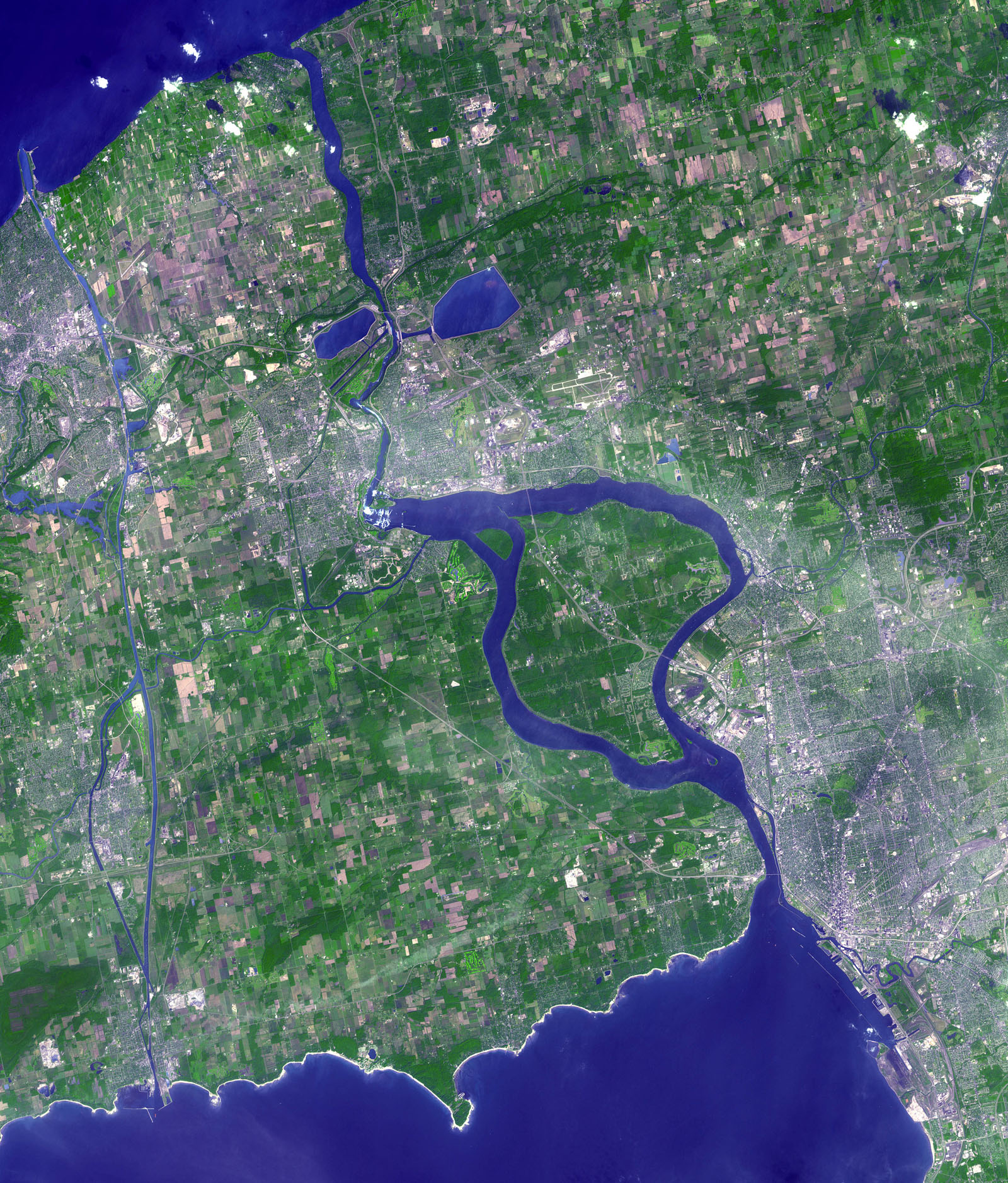
Satellite image of Niagara River flowing north from Lake Erie (bottom) to Lake Ontario (top). The river flows around Grand Island, and then flows over Niagara Falls. It narrows in the Niagara Gorge, where two hydropower reservoirs are visible, and then widens after exiting the gorge. The Welland Canal is visible on the far left.

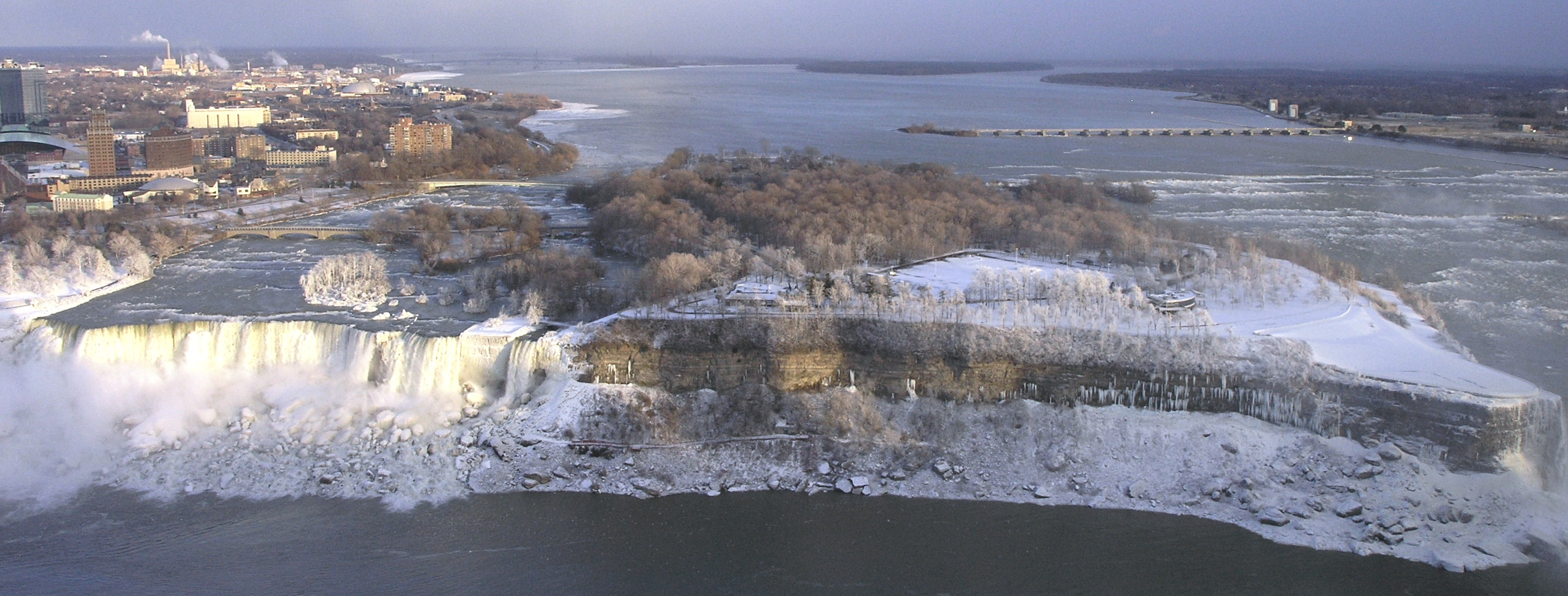
American Falls with Goat Island to its right

The Niagara River (/naɪˈæɡərə, -ɡrə/ ny-AGG-ər-ə, -grə) flows north from Lake Erie to Lake Ontario, forming part of the border between Ontario, Canada, to the west, and New York, United States, to the east. The river, occasionally described as a strait, is approximately 58 kilometres (36 miles) long and is known for the Niagara Falls. Over the past 12,000 years, the falls have moved roughly 11 kilometres (6.8 mi) upstream from the leading edge of the Niagara Escarpment, creating a gorge below the falls. Today, the diversion of the river for electricity generation has significantly slowed the rate of erosion. The total elevation drop along the river is 99 metres (325 ft). The Niagara downstream from the falls, includes the Niagara Whirlpool and additional rapids.

Power plants on the river include the Sir Adam Beck Hydroelectric Generating Stations (built in 1922 and 1954) on the Canadian side, and the Robert Moses Niagara Power Plant (built in 1961) on the American side, collectively generating 4.4 gigawatts of electricity. The International Control Dam, constructed in 1954, regulates river flow. Ships on the Great Lakes use the Welland Canal, part of the St. Lawrence Seaway, on the Canadian side of the river, to bypass Niagara Falls.

The Niagara River features two large islands and several smaller ones. Grand Island and Navy Island, the two largest, are on the American and Canadian sides, respectively. Goat Island and the small Luna Island divide Niagara Falls into three sections: Horseshoe Falls, Bridal Veil Falls, and American Falls. Unity Island lies further upstream, adjacent to the city of Buffalo.

The Niagara River and its tributaries, Tonawanda Creek and the Welland River, formed part of the final section of the Erie Canal and Welland Canal. After leaving Lockport, the Erie Canal heads southwest into Tonawanda Creek. Upon entering the Niagara River, watercraft proceed south to the final lock, where a short canal section allows boats to bypass turbulent shoal water and enter Lake Erie. The Welland Canals used the Welland River to connect to the Niagara River south of the falls, enabling water traffic to safely re-enter the river and continue to Lake Erie.

The origin of the river's name is debated. Iroquoian scholar Bruce Trigger suggests it is derived from a branch of the local Neutral Confederacy, referred to as the Niagagarega people on several late-17th-century French maps. George R. Stewart posits that it comes from an Iroquois town named Ongniaahra, meaning "point of land cut in two."

== History ==
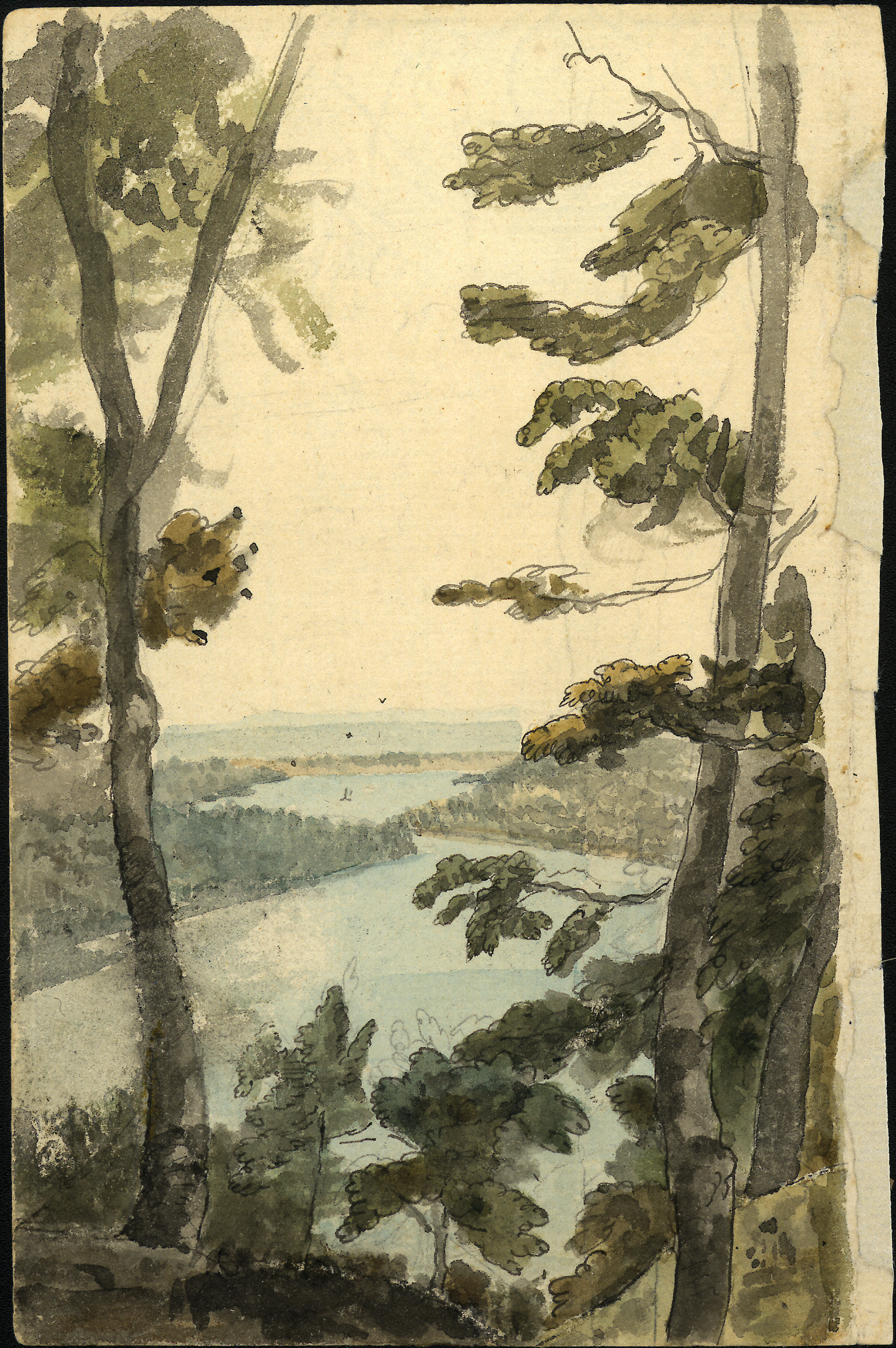
Watercolour by Elizabeth Simcoe depicting the Niagara River from Queenston Heights, c. 1793

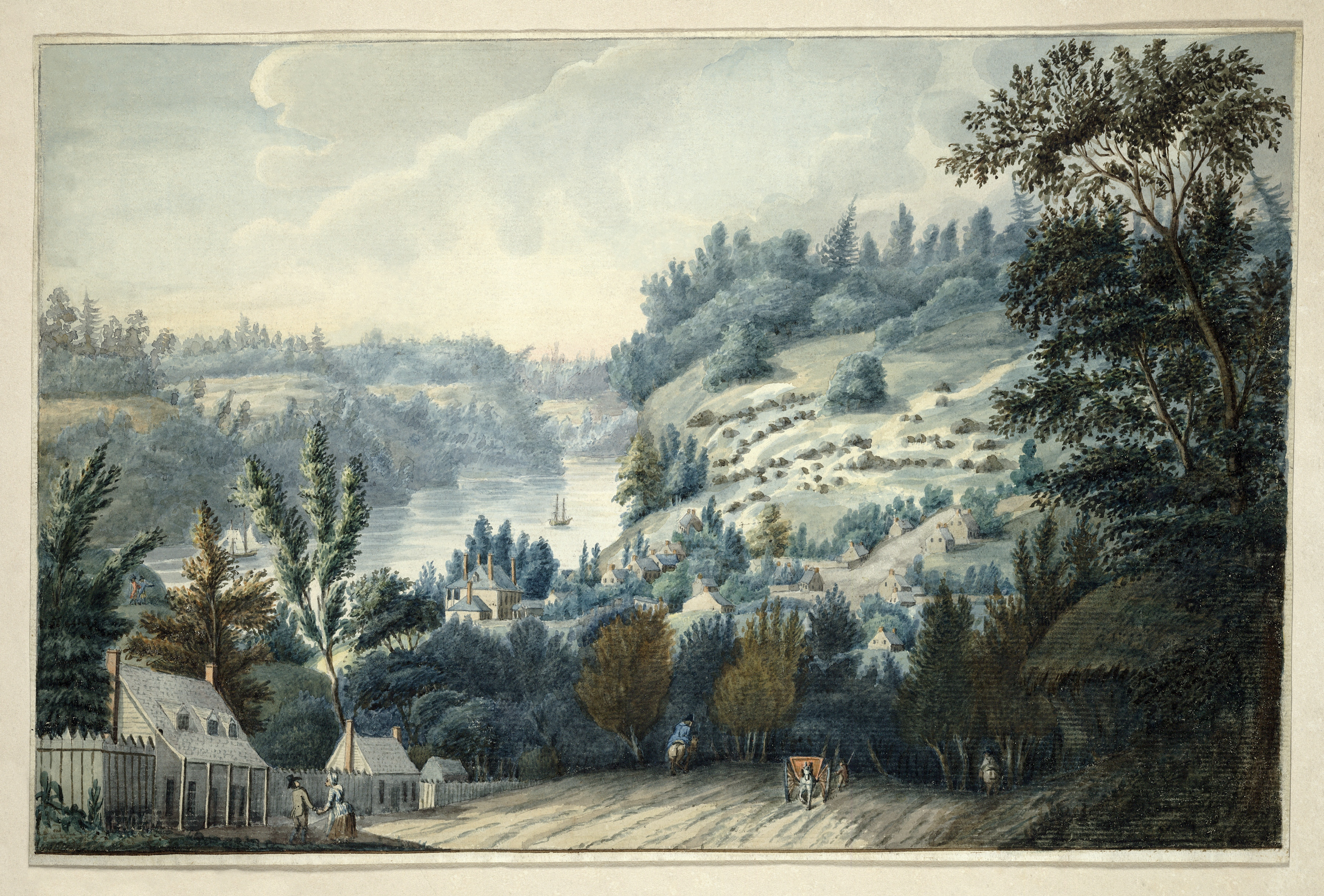
Niagara River at Queenston, Ontario, then known as Queenstown, Upper Canada, c. 1805 watercolour

The Niagara River and Falls have been known outside of North America since the late 17th century, when Father Louis Hennepin, a French explorer, first witnessed them. He wrote about his travels in A New Discovery of a Vast Country in America (1698).

The Niagara River was the site of the earliest recorded railway in America. It was an inclined wooden tramway built by John Montresor (1736–1799), a British military engineer, in 1764. Called "The Cradles" and "The Old Lewiston Incline", it featured loaded carts pulled up wooden rails by rope. It facilitated the movement of goods over the Niagara Escarpment in present-day Lewiston, New York.

In 1781, the Niagara Purchase was signed, involving a 6.5-kilometre-wide (4.0-mile) strip of land bordering the west bank of the Niagara River, connecting Lake Erie and Lake Ontario.

Several battles occurred along the Niagara River, which was historically defended by Fort George (Canadian side) and Fort Niagara (American side) at the mouth of the river and Fort Erie (Canadian side) at the head of the river. These forts were important during the Seven Years' War (known as the French and Indian War in the United States) and the American Revolutionary War. The Battle of Queenston Heights took place near the river in the War of 1812.

The river was an important route to liberation before the American Civil War, as many African Americans escaping slavery on the Underground Railroad crossed it to find freedom in Canada. The Freedom Crossing Monument stands on the bank of the river in Lewiston to commemorate the courage of the escaping slaves and the local volunteers who helped them secretly cross the river.

In the 1880s, the Niagara River became the first waterway in the world harnessed for large-scale generation of hydroelectricity.

On the Canadian side of the river the provincial agency Niagara Parks Commission maintains all of the shoreline property, including Fort Erie, except the sites of Fort George (a National Historic Site maintained federally by Parks Canada), as a public greenspace and environmental heritage.

On the American side, the New York State Office of Parks, Recreation and Historic Preservation maintains several state parks adjacent to Niagara Falls and the Niagara River.

Today, the river is the namesake of Niagara Herald Extraordinary at the Canadian Heraldic Authority.

== Cities and settlements ==
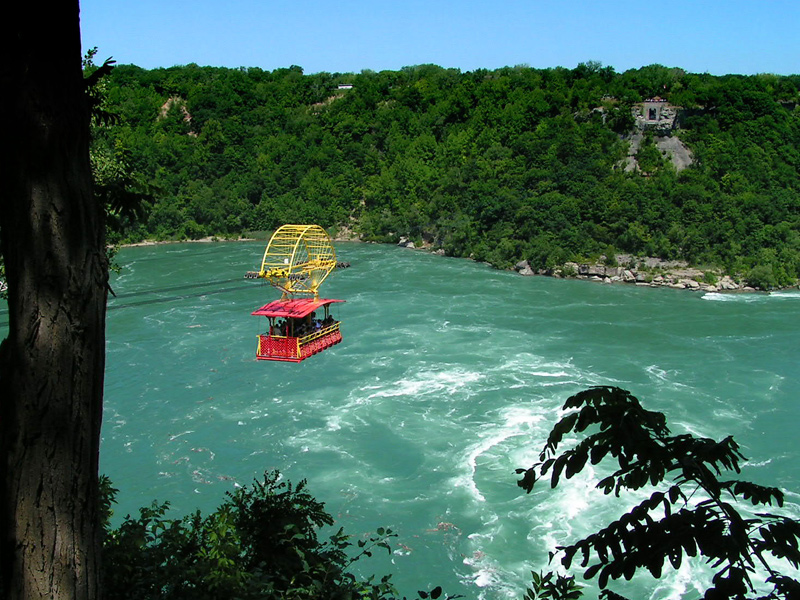
Whirlpool Aero Car crossing Niagara Whirlpool

Cities and towns along the Niagara River include:

Name	Country
Buffalo	United States
Chippawa	Canada
Fort Erie	Canada
Lewiston	United States
Grand Island	United States
Niagara Falls	United States
Niagara Falls	Canada
Niagara-on-the-Lake	Canada
North Tonawanda	United States
Porter	United States
Queenston	Canada
Tonawanda (City)	United States
Tonawanda (Town)	United States
Wheatfield	United States
Youngstown	United States

== Pollution ==
The Niagara River is listed as a Great Lakes Areas of Concern in The Great Lakes Water Quality Agreement between the United States and Canada.

== Crossings ==
The Niagara River has a long history of both road and rail bridges spanning the river, both upstream and downstream of the Falls. This history includes numerous bridges that have fallen victim to the harsh conditions of the Niagara Gorge, such as landslides and icepacks.

== Parks ==
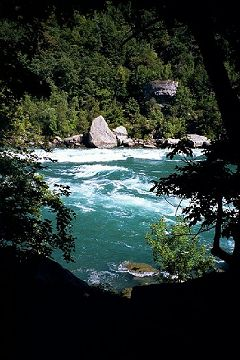
Niagara Glen features many rapids downstream of Niagara Falls

The following parks are located along the Niagara River:

Name	Country
Beaver Island State Park	United States
Bowen Road Park	Canada
Browns Point Park	Canada
Buckhorn Island State Park	United States
De Veaux Woods State Park	United States
Dufferin Islands Natural Area	Canada
Earl W. Brydges Artpark State Park	United States
Falkner Park	United States
Fisherman's Park	United States
Floral Clock Park	Canada
Fort George National Historic Site	Canada
Fort Niagara State Park	United States
Freedom Park	United States
Gratwick Riverside Park	United States
Griffon Park	United States
Jayne Park	United States
Joseph Davis State Park	United States
King's Bridge Park	Canada
MacFarland Park	Canada
Niagara Falls State Park	United States
Niagara Glen Nature Reserve	Canada
Niagara Parks Botanical Gardens	Canada
Niawanda Park	United States
Nike Base Park	United States
Queen's Parade Park & Memorial Park	Canada
Queenston Heights	Canada
Riverside Park	United States
Strawberry Island State Park	United States
Sugar Bowl Park	Canada
Veterans Memorial Park	United States
Queen Victoria Park	Canada
Whirlpool State Park	United States

A Niagara River Greenway Plan is in progress in the United States.

== Hydrologic features ==
Hydrologic Features of the Niagara River
Feature	Location	Country	Notes	Photo
Source of Niagara River	42.8842°N 78.9142°W	Canada; United States	The Niagara River originates at the north-east end of Lake Erie, and flows north to its mouth at Lake Ontario.	
Black Rock Canal	42.907°N 78.9021°W	United States	Black Rock Canal flows within and parallel to the east shore of the Niagara river near Buffalo, New York, and was built to extend the navigation period in the Niagara River through a greater part of the winter. The canal begins at Buffalo Harbor, on the north-east shore of Lake Erie, then flows north, ending at the Black Rock Lock near the north tip of Unity Island. The canal is buffered from the Niagara River by Bird Island Pier at its south end, and Unity Island at its north end.	
Gould Ditch	42.9207°N 78.9118°W	Canada	Historic tributary. Once served as a drainage ditch for Gould National Battery plant.	
Scajaquada Creek	42.9291°N 78.8991°W	United States	Tributary.	
Frenchman's Creek	42.9426°N 78.9274°W	Canada	Tributary.	
Chippawa Channel	42.9533°N 78.9376°W	Canada; United States	The north-flowing Niagara River bifurcates at the south tip of Grand Island (both sections rejoin at the north tip). "Chippawa Channel" is the river passage on the west side of Grand Island.	
Miller Creek	42.9553°N 78.9754°W	Canada	Tributary.	
Tonawanda Channel	42.9608°N 78.9294°W	United States	When the Niagara River bifurcates at Grand Island, the east passage—from the south tip of Grand Island, to a point just north of Tonawanda, New York—is the "Tonawanda Channel".	
Baker Creek	42.9728°N 79.0080°W	Canada	Tributary.	
Black Creek	42.9810°N 79.0235°W	Canada	Tributary.	
Boyer's Creek	43.0020°N 79.0295°W	Canada	Tributary.	
Two Mile Creek	43.0108°N 78.9066°W	United States	Tributary.	
Little River (at Tonawanda Island)	43.0229°N 78.8850°W	United States	Flows between Tonawanda Island and the New York mainland, within the Tonawanda Channel.	
Tonawanda Creek	43.0233°N 78.8817°W	United States	Tributary.	
Spicer Creek	43.0253°N 78.8942°W	United States	Tributary on Grand Island, New York.	
Big Sixmile Creek	43.0265°N 79.0118°W	United States	Tributary on Grand Island, New York.	
Little Sixmile Creek	43.0285°N 79.0102°W	United States	Tributary on Grand Island, New York.	
Niagara River Channel	43.0358°N 78.8938°W	United States	When the Niagara River bifurcates at Grand Island, the east passage—from a point just north of Tonawanda, New York, to the north tip of Grand Island—is the "Niagara River Channel".	
Gun Creek	43.0495°N 78.9157°W	United States	Tributary on Grand Island, New York.	
Usshers Creek	43.0513°N 79.0225°W	Canada	Tributary.	
Burnt Ship Creek	43.0610°N 78.9975°W	United States	Tributary on Grand Island, New York.	
Woods Creek	43.0623°N 78.9770°W	United States	Tributary on Grand Island, New York.	
Welland River	43.0627°N 79.0480°W	Canada	Historic tributary. Became a man-made distributary—from the Niagara River to a point 5 km west—in order to supply water to an intake channel for Sir Adam Beck Hydroelectric Power Stations.	
Underwater intake tunnel to Sir Adam Beck Hydroelectric Power Stations	43.0671°N 79.0540°W	Canada		
Little River (at Cayuga Island)	43.0732°N 78.9517°W	United States	Flows between Cayuga Island and the New York mainland, within the Niagara River Channel.	
Cayuga Creek	43.0759°N 78.9628°W	United States	Tributary.	
Underwater intake for tunnel to Niagara Power Project	43.0772°N 79.0158°W	United States		
Horseshoe Falls	43.0773°N 79.0751°W	Canada	Located between the Canadian mainland and Goat Island, New York, the Horseshoe Falls is the largest, and most south-western of three parallel waterfalls over which the Niagara River flows. There is dispute as to whether the Horseshoe Falls lies entirely within Canada (see Niagara Falls#History).	
Gill Creek	43.0783°N 79.0258°W	United States	Tributary.	
Goat Island Channel	43.0806°N 79.0605°W	United States	The Niagara River bifurcates at the south-east tip of Goat Island. "Goat Island Channel" is the north-east passage around the island.	
Bridal Veil Falls	43.0838°N 79.0708°W	United States	Located between Goat Island and Luna Island, Bridal Veil Falls is the smallest (and middle) of the three parallel waterfalls over which the Niagara River flows. It is entirely within the US.	
American Falls	43.0849°N 79.0695°W	United States	Located between Luna Island and the New York mainland, the American Falls is the most northern and second largest of three parallel waterfalls over which the Niagara River flows. It is located entirely within the US.	
Muddy Run Falls	43.1150°N 79.0625°W	Canada	Historic tributary which entered the Niagara River as a waterfall from the top of the Niagara Gorge. Development above Muddy Run Falls destroyed its water supply.	
Whirlpool Rapids	43.1160°N 79.0625°W	Canada; United States		
Colt's Creek Falls	43.1198°N 79.0720°W	Canada	Tributary which enters the Niagara River as a waterfall from the top of the Niagara Gorge. The volume was greatly diminished following construction of the canal to Sir Adam Beck Hydroelectric Power Stations.	
Niagara Whirlpool	43.1202°N 79.0695°W	Canada; United States	The Niagara Whirlpool is a natural whirlpool along the Niagara River located along the Canada–US border between New York and Ontario. The whirlpool is located in the Niagara Gorge, downstream from Niagara Falls. The whirlpool's greatest depth is 125 feet (38 m).	
Harvie Falls	43.1220°N 79.0743°W	Canada	Tributary which enters the Niagara River as a waterfall from the top of the Niagara Gorge. The volume was greatly diminished following construction of the canal to Sir Adam Beck Hydroelectric Power Stations.	
Devil's Hole Rapids	43.1335°N 79.0509°W	Canada; United States		
Bloody Run Falls	43.1350°N 79.0473°W	United States	Tributary which enters the Niagara River as a waterfall from the top of the Niagara Gorge. The volume was greatly diminished following construction of Robert Moses State Parkway and other streets above the falls.	Log Cabin, Bloody Run, Niagara, N.Y, from Robert N. Dennis collection of stereoscopic views
Niagara Power Project	43.1430°N 79.0398°W	United States		
Sir Adam Beck Hydroelectric Power Stations	43.1474°N 79.044°W	Canada		
Smeaton Falls	43.1563°N 79.046°W	Canada	Tributary which enters the Niagara River as a waterfall from the top of the Niagara Gorge. The volume was greatly diminished following the construction of Sir Adam Beck Hydroelectric Power Stations.	
Spring Cave Cascade	43.1573°N 79.0444°W	United States	Historic tributary which entered the Niagara River as a cascade from caves in the wall of the Niagara Gorge. Its source was destroyed following construction of the Niagara Power Project.	
Fish Creek Falls	43.1590°N 79.0446°W	United States	Tributary which enters the Niagara River as a waterfall from the top of the Niagara Gorge. The volume was greatly diminished following the construction of the Niagara Power Project.	
Locust Grove Falls	43.1592°N 79.0475°W	Canada	Tributary which enters the Niagara River as a waterfall from the top of the Niagara Gorge. The volume was greatly diminished following the construction of Sir Adam Beck Hydroelectric Power Stations.	
Mouth of Niagara River	43.2625°N 79.0700°W	Canada; United States		

=== Discharge ===
Niagara River at Buffalo

Multiannual average discharge
Period	Average discharge (m^{3}/s)
2017–2025	6,762
1900–2019	5,959
1860–1907	6,003

Year	Average discharge (2017–2025)
2017	236,299.401 cu ft/s (6,691.2539 m^{3}/s)
2018	242,942.466 cu ft/s (6,879.3645 m^{3}/s)
2019	258,575.163 cu ft/s (7,322.0332 m^{3}/s)
2020	265,573.77 cu ft/s (7,520.212 m^{3}/s)
2021	245,641.096 cu ft/s (6,955.7812 m^{3}/s)
2022	237,517.808 cu ft/s (6,725.7553 m^{3}/s)
2023	227,591.781 cu ft/s (6,444.6815 m^{3}/s)
2024	225,748.634 cu ft/s (6,392.4894 m^{3}/s)
2025	209,142.466 cu ft/s (5,922.2551 m^{3}/s)

== Islands ==
Several islands are located on the upper river upriver from the falls:

Name	Location	Country	Status	Notes
Bird Island	Buffalo	United States	Filled in	Connected to Unity Island in 1822 as part of improvements to Black Rock harbor.
Brig Island	Niagara Falls	United States	Park	Part of Niagara Falls State Park.
Brother Island	Niagara Falls	United States	Park	Located near Niagara Falls and the Three Sisters Islands; part of Niagara Falls State Park.
Buckhorn Island	Grand Island	United States	Park	Located on the north end of Grand Island. A state park.
Cayuga Island	Niagara Falls	United States	Residential	Located at the mouth of Cayuga Creek; a residential neighborhood of the city.
Cedar Island	Niagara Falls	Canada	Filled in	Filled in by the creation of the Rankine Generating Station by Canadian Niagara Power Company in 1905.
Conners Island	Niagara Falls	United States	Filled in	Also known in some sources as "Coroner Island". Filled in sometime in the 1950s or early '60s. Currently the site of the Niagara Power Station Intake.
Deer Island	Niagara Falls	United States		
Dufferin Islands	Niagara Falls	Canada	Park	Man-made islands. Parkland.
Goat Island	Niagara Falls	United States	Park	Located at the brink of the American Falls, named by John Stedman in the 1770s; briefly renamed to Iris Island by General Augustus Porter, a United States Commissioner (after the Greek Goddess of the Rainbow). Now part of Niagara Falls State Park.
Goose Island	City of Tonawanda	United States	Man-made/filled in	Was located at the confluence of Tonawanda Creek and the Tonawanda Channel of the Niagara River. Existed from 1825, when the Erie Canal was constructed (thereby cutting Goose Island off from the mainland) until the 1940s, when this portion of the canal was filled in.
Grand Island		United States	Developed	The largest island on the river; includes several parks, but is mostly residential and industrial; originally called Ga-We-Not (Great Island) by the Seneca.
Grass Island	Niagara Falls	United States	Filled in	Filled in during the 1960s to create the Robert Moses Parkway at Point Day.
Green Island	Niagara Falls	United States	Park	Originally called Bath Island, it was renamed in the early 1900s for Niagara Reservation Commissioner Andrew H. Green. Part of Niagara Falls State Park.
Gull Island	Niagara Falls	Canada	Park	Located near the wreck of the Old Scow in Canadian waters.
Hogg Island	Niagara Falls	Canada	Filled in	Filled in by the creation of the Chippawa Queenston Power Canal in 1917 and finally by the Sir Adam Beck Dam #2 in 1950 by the Hydro Electric Power Commission of Ontario.
Little Beaver Island	Grand Island	United States	Park	Located off the south end of Grand Island; part of Beaver Island State Park.
Luna Island	Niagara Falls	United States	Park	Located next to Goat Island; originally called Prospect Island. Part of Niagara Falls State Park.
Motor Island	Grand Island	United States	Park	Also known as Pirates' Island (the name of a private club once located there) and Frog Island (not to be confused with the former Frog Island listed below). A New York State Wildlife Management Area.
Navy Island	Niagara Falls	Canada	Park	Designated as a National Historic Park.
Rattlesnake Island	Town of Tonawanda	United States	Filled in	Was located just south of what is today the South Grand Island Bridge. Was filled in sometime between 1915 and 1927, concurrent with the heavy industrial development of the area.
Robinson Island	Niagara Falls	United States	Park	Named for daredevil Joel Robinson in 1860. Now part of Niagara Falls State Park.
Ship Island	Niagara Falls	United States	Park	Part of Niagara Falls State Park.
Stony Island	Niagara Falls	United States	Unknown	Shown in the 1908 New Century Atlas of Niagara and Orleans County but not mentioned in any other source. Supposedly located just offshore from the mouth of Gill Creek. No longer extant, if it ever was.
Strawberry Island	Town of Tonawanda	United States	Park	A small island, formerly much larger but diminished by gravel mining and erosion. An undeveloped state park and wildlife preserve.
Tern Island		United States	Submerged/reconstructed	Originally known as Frog Island; was located in the Upper Niagara River between Motor and Strawberry Islands; disappeared sometime between 1951 and 1985 due to erosion. Re-created as a habitat for fish, aquatic plants, and waterfowl including a nesting colony of common terns established in 2021, for whom the new island was named.
Three Sisters Islands	Niagara Falls	United States	Park	Located next to Goat Island within Niagara Falls State Park. Originally called Moss Islands, they were later renamed for the three daughters of War of 1812 United States Army General Parkhurst Whitney (Asenath, Angeline and Celinda Eliza) in 1843.
Tonawanda Island	North Tonawanda	United States	Developed	Occupied by a marina and several industries.
Tower Island	Niagara Falls	United States	Man-made	Man-made island created in 1942 and completed in 1954 by the US Army Corps of Engineers to construct International Control Dam.
Unity Island	Buffalo	United States	Developed	Home to Broderick Park, Unity Island Park, and a waste-water treatment facility.
Willow Island	Niagara Falls	United States	Man-made/filled in	Man-made island created in 1759 by Daniel Joncairs and filled in during the 1960s to create the Robert Moses Parkway.

== Military posts ==
United States Coast Guard Fort Niagara Station was once a United States Army post. There are no Canadian Coast Guard posts along the river. Fort Mississauga, Fort George and Fort Erie are former British and Canadian military forts (last used 1953, 1965 and 1923 respectively) and are now parks.

Navy Island Royal Naval Shipyard was used by the French Navy in the 18th century as a naval base and by the Royal Navy from 1763 as a small shipyard, and abandoned around 1818 after the ratification of the Rush–Bagot Treaty in 1817.

== Roads ==
On the Canadian side the Niagara Parkway travels along the River from Lake Ontario to Lake Erie.

NY 18F lines the river on the state side from Fort Niagara to Lewiston. Niagara Scenic Parkway on the state side only travels along the River from the Falls to Lewiston. The remaining river sections (with some interruptions) are covered by the LaSalle Expressway, NY 384, NY 266 and I-190 (Niagara Thruway) / New York Thruway.

== See also ==
- List of international border rivers
- List of New York rivers
- List of Ontario rivers
- Whirlpool Aero Car
