= Cave of the Winds =

Cave of the Winds may refer to:

- Cave of the Winds (New York), a former cave and current tourist attraction at Niagara Falls
- Cave of the Winds (Colorado)
- Cave of the Winds (Malaysia), a cave at Gunung Mulu National Park, Sarawak, Borneo
