= Luna Island =

Island in the Niagara River in New York, US

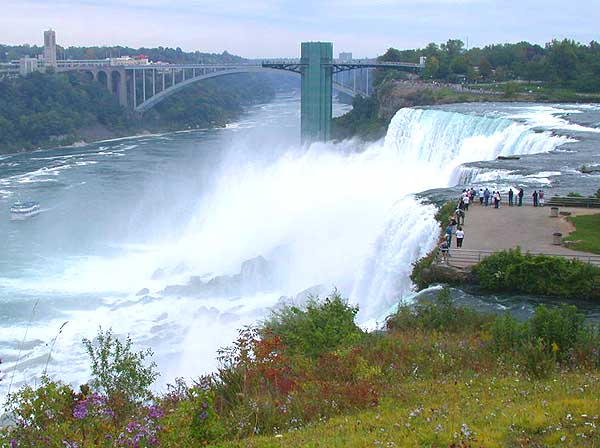
- Spectators on Luna Island (right) as seen from Goat Island (bottom) looking towards Bridal Veil Falls (lower right) and American Falls (upper right)
- Interactive map of Luna Island

Geography
- Location: Niagara River
- Coordinates: 43°5′0″N 79°4′13″W
- Length: 350 ft (107 m)
- Width: 130 ft (40 m)

Administration
- United States of America

Demographics
- Population: 0

Luna Island is a very small uninhabited island in the Niagara River in the U.S. state of New York.

== Location and features ==
Luna Island is in Niagara Falls, New York between Goat Island and Niagara Falls State Park.

It is between the American Falls and Bridal Veil Falls, which are two of the three waterfalls that make up Niagara Falls. It is approximately 130 feet (40 m) wide (between the two falls) and 350 feet (110 m) long (extending upstream from the falls). The geology of the island is dolomite rock and concrete base in the area around the falls. White cedar trees cover the south end of the island and shrubs along north end. The original wooden bridge to the island, added in the 1800s, was replaced in the 20th century.

=== Spectator opportunities ===
Spectators can view the falls from Luna Island and the proximate Goat Island, both of which are accessible by pedestrian bridges that cross the rapids of the Niagara River upstream from the falls. Spectators on Luna Island can stand a few feet away from the Bridal Veil Falls and American Falls by walking across the island. Representatives of the nearby Schoellkopf Geological Museum often come to Luna Island where they bring photographs and answer questions about Niagara Falls.

== Name ==
The island is said to derive its name from the ability of an observer, when standing on the island during a full moon, to see "lunar rainbows" in the Niagara mist.
