= Niagara Falls State Park =

State park in New York, United States

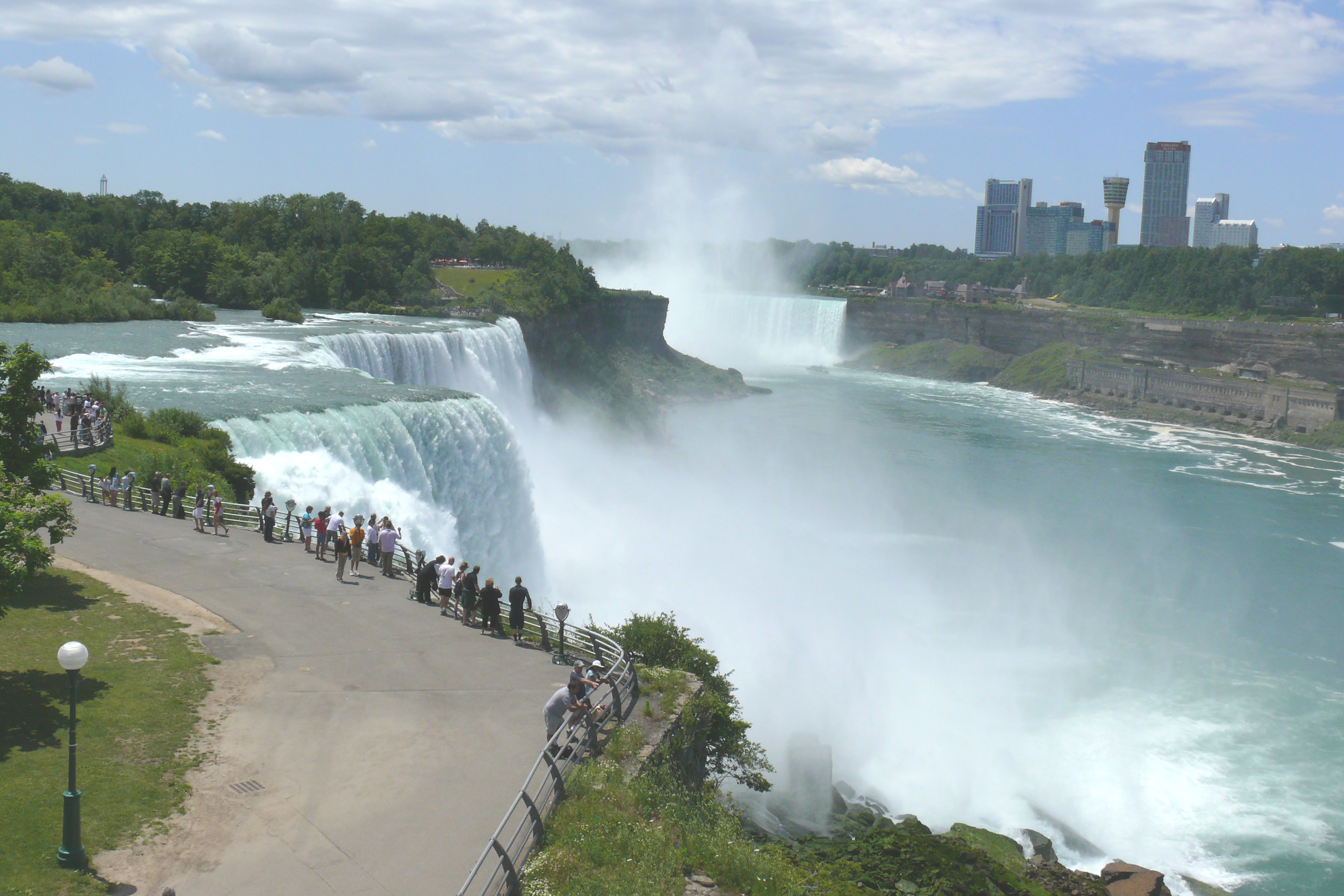
- Niagara Falls State Park's overlook of the American Falls, with the Horseshoe Falls in the distance

- Location within New York Location within the United States
- Type: State park
- Location: Prospect Street & Old Falls Street; Niagara Falls, New York, U.S.
- Coordinates: 43°05′N 79°04′W
- Area: 221 acres (0.89 km^{2})
- Created: 1885 (141 years ago)
- Operator: New York State Office of Parks, Recreation and Historic Preservation
- Visitors: 9,529,325 (in 2016)
- Open: All year
- Website: niagarafallsstatepark.com
- Niagara Reservation
- U.S. National Register of Historic Places
- U.S. National Historic Landmark
- Location: Niagara Falls, New York, U.S.
- Area: 435 acres (176 ha) (landmarked area)
- Built: 1885; 141 years ago
- NRHP reference No.: 66000555

Significant dates
- Added to NRHP: October 15, 1966
- Designated NHL: May 23, 1963

Niagara Falls State Park is a state park located in Niagara Falls, New York, United States. It is recognized as the oldest state park in the United States, and contains the American Falls, the Bridal Veil Falls, and a portion of the Horseshoe Falls (also known as the Canadian Falls).

== History ==
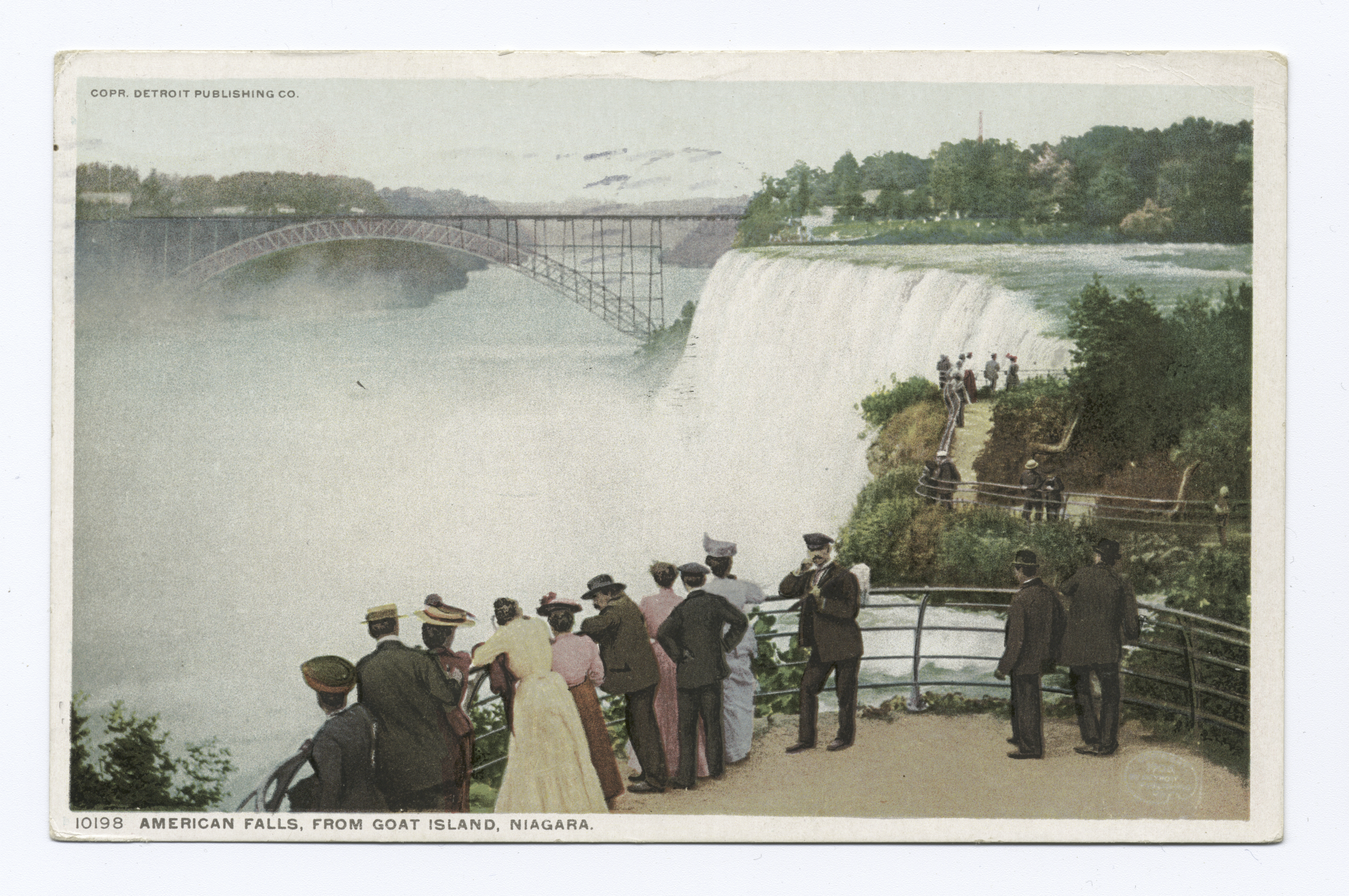
Postcard from 1898 showing view of the American Falls from Goat Island

Prior to being protected, the lands surrounding Niagara Falls on both sides of the river were largely controlled by private interests, and public access to the falls was limited. Landscape architect Frederick Law Olmsted, an early champion of the falls' surroundings, began advocating for their preservation in the 1860s. In 1879, at the behest of the New York State Legislature, Olmsted and State Surveyor James T. Gardner helped prepare a special report on the falls' conditions, which argued for increased public access to the falls and recommended that the state purchase lands for that purpose. The report was followed by a publicity and petitioning campaign that helped bring the issue to the public's attention.

Olmsted and others formed the Niagara Falls Association in 1883, a group that aimed to lobby New York to acquire and protect the falls from private exploitation. Their efforts succeeded later that year when, on April 30, 1883, a bill authorizing the "selection, location and appropriation of certain lands in the village of Niagara Falls for a state reservation" was signed into law by then-governor Grover Cleveland. The act led to the establishment of the Niagara Reservation in 1885. New York State Assemblyman Thomas Vincent Welch figured prominently in getting the bill signed, and served as the first Superintendent of the Park for 18 years from its inception until 1903.

Niagara Falls State Park is claimed to be the oldest continuously operating state park in the United States (Note: Although claimed as the oldest state park in the United States, Niagara Falls was not the first state-managed park. For a discussion of earlier state parks, see History of state parks in the United States.) and the first established via eminent domain.

The impetus to protect the falls and improve their accessibility to the public was international; early lobbying for the park's creation was bolstered by similar plans that were proposed for the Ontario side of the Niagara River. Although plans for an international park did not come to fruition, work to establish a park under Ontario provincial authority began in 1885, with the creation of the Niagara Parks Commission. The Queen Victoria Niagara Falls Park, today known as Queen Victoria Park, was created in 1887.

The Niagara Reservation's early design was accomplished by Olmsted and architect Calvert Vaux. The team completed their designs in 1887, with a focus on improving public access while preserving the landscape's natural and scenic elements, to the exclusion of commercial and resort-style attractions.

The Niagara Reservation was declared a U.S. National Historic Landmark in 1963. It is a major contributing element to the Niagara Falls National Heritage Area.

A $44-million refurbishment of the park's facilities was completed in 2003. Work focused on improvements to the park's observation tower, visitor center, bridges, trails, and other infrastructure.

In 2007, Niagara Falls State Park was named as the 10th most beautiful spot in America by The Today Show.

== Park facilities ==
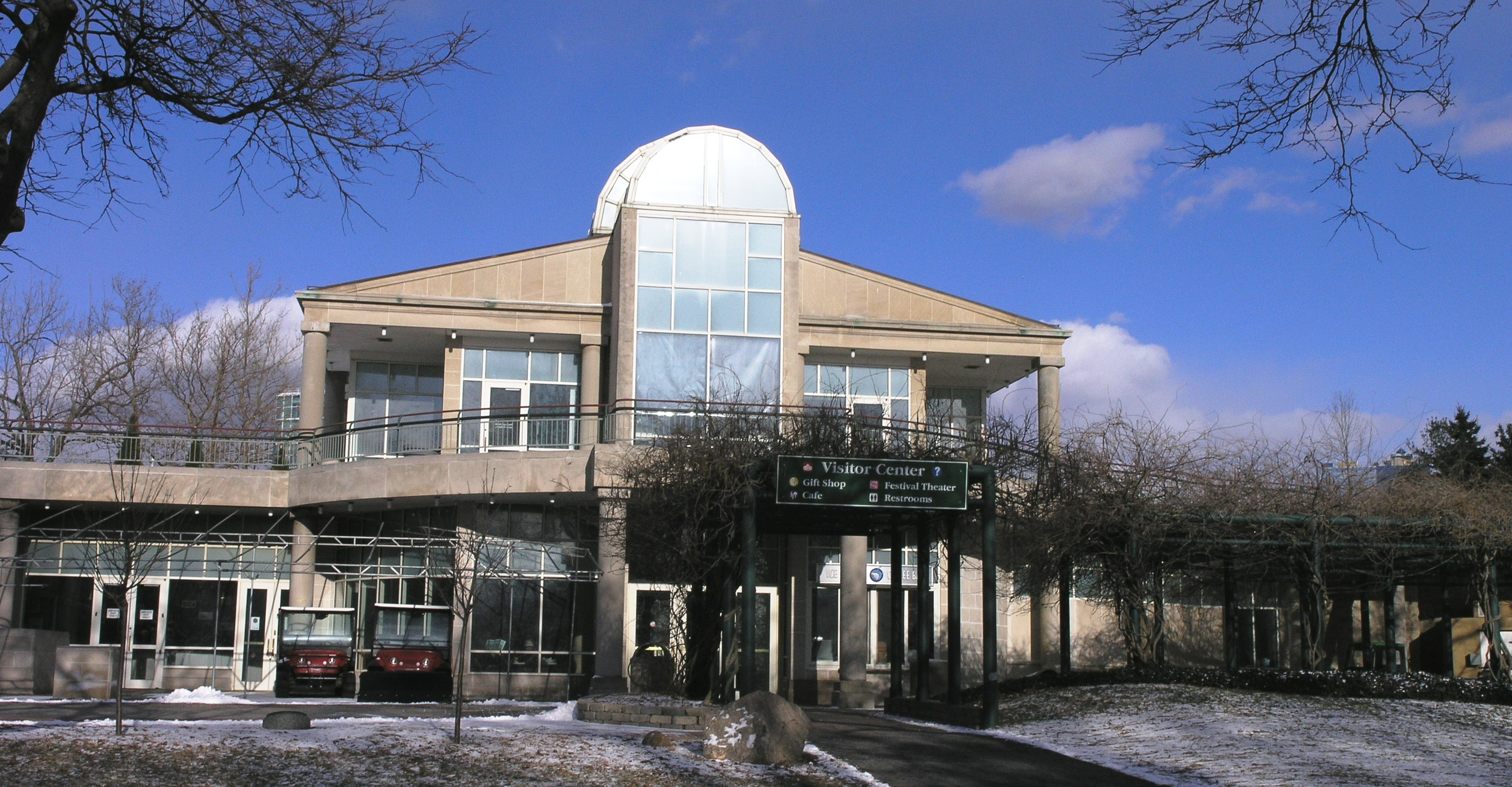
Niagara Falls State Park visitors center

In addition to its views of the American Falls, Bridal Veil Falls, and the Canadian Falls, the park overlooks the Niagara Gorge and allows access to the Maid of the Mist tour boats, Cave of the Winds, Goat Island, the Prospect Point Observation Tower, a statue of Nikola Tesla, and the IMAX movie Niagara: Miracles, Myths and Magic which is shown at the Niagara Adventure Theater.

The park also offers a museum, food concession, a movie theater, a gift shop, fireworks, hiking and nature trails, picnic tables, recreation programs, and fishing. The Top of the Falls Restaurant, on Goat Island overlooking the Horseshoe Falls, is also available within the park.

== See also ==
- Niagara Parks Commission – the Ontario provincial agency created the commission in 1885 to manage the shoreline and parks at Niagara Falls and along the Ontario side of the Niagara River. The commission opened Queen Victoria Park in 1887.
- List of New York state parks
- List of waterfalls
- Hot Springs National Park, Arkansas – the first national nature reserve in the United States
