= Goat Island (New York) =

Island in the Niagara River in New York, US

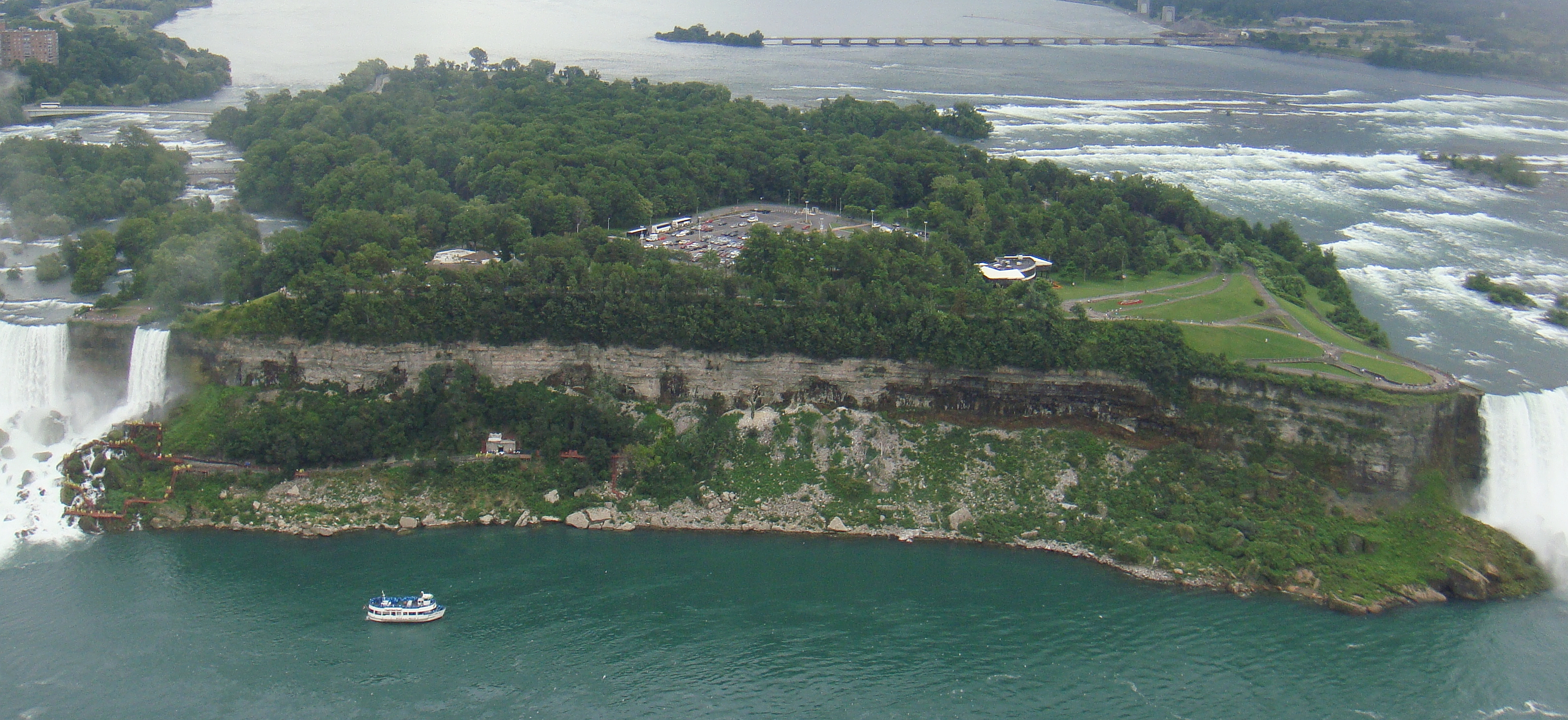
- Goat Island

- Location within New York
- Interactive map of Goat Island

Geography
- Location: Niagara River
- Coordinates: 43°04′51″N 79°04′03″W
- Highest elevation: 558 ft (170.1 m)

Administration
- United States
- State: New York
- County: Niagara
- City: Niagara Falls, New York

Additional information
- Official website: Official website

Goat Island (previously called Iris Island) is a small island in the Niagara River, in the middle of Niagara Falls between the Bridal Veil Falls and the Horseshoe Falls. The island is at the southwest corner of the City of Niagara Falls (and of Niagara County), New York, in the United States and is part of Niagara Falls State Park.

Goat Island has no residents but is a destination for tourists visiting the falls on the U.S. side. It has several viewing points, including Terrapin Point. Goat Island is connected to the U.S. mainland by two bridges that carry foot, car, and trackless train traffic, and to the smaller Luna Island (adjacent to the American Falls) by a pedestrian bridge. Goat Island is largely wooded and is interlaced with foot trails. The Cave of the Winds tour elevator provides access down to the foot of the falls.

== Geology ==
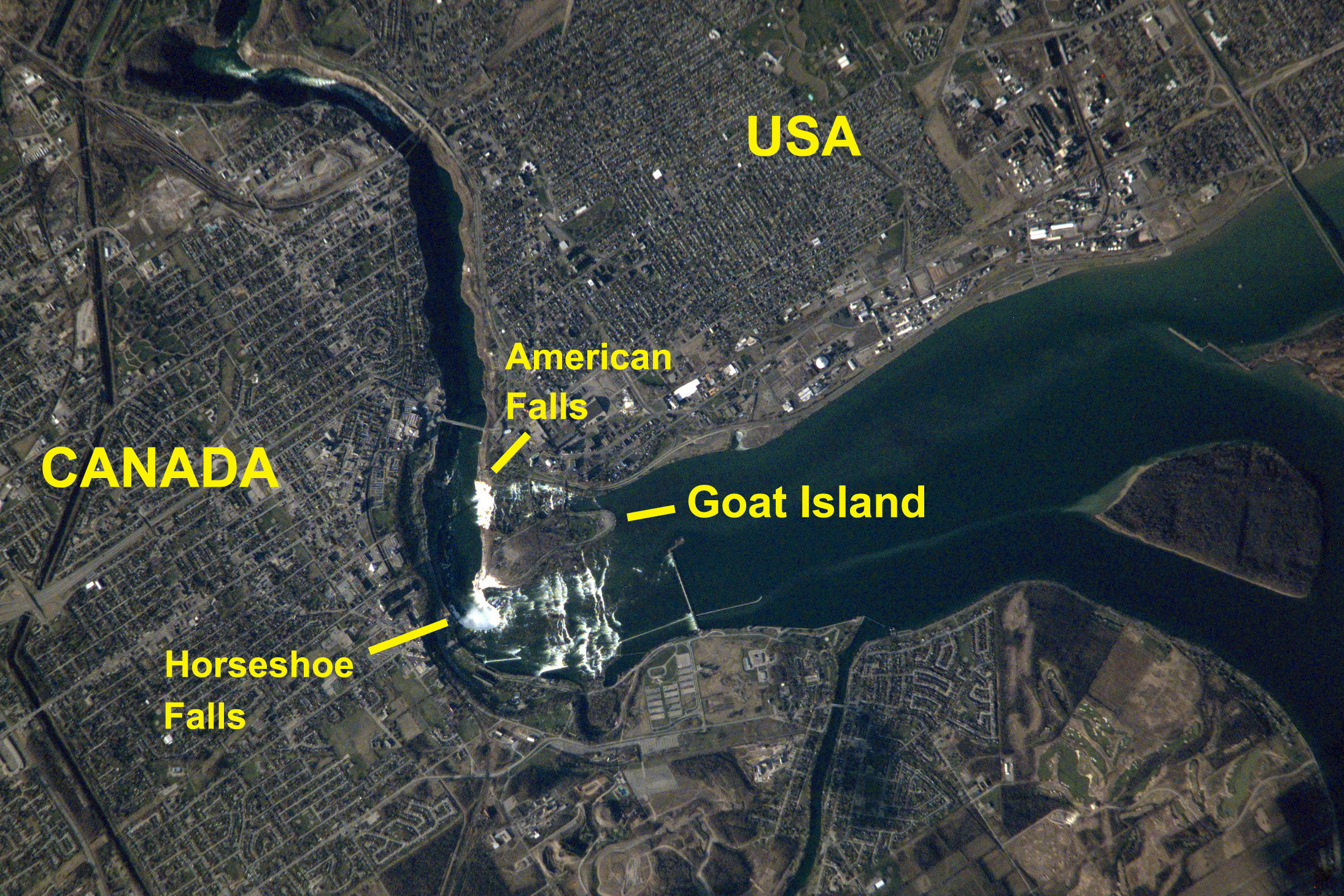

The island was formed during the recent retreat of the falls as it cut inward (upstream) through the Niagara Escarpment. The Niagara River's channel splits in two above the falls, creating two sets of falls, one on either side of the island. In 1959–60, the island's eastern side was extended about 8.5 acres (34,000 m^{2}) for additional parking and a helicopter pad. Fill was provided from excavation for the construction of the Robert Moses State Parkway. In 1954–1955 the area between the Terrapin Rocks and Goat Island was filled in, creating Terrapin Point.

In the early 1980s, the United States Army Corps of Engineers filled in more land and built diversion dams and retaining walls to force the water away from Terrapin Point. Altogether 400 feet (120 m) of the Horseshoe Falls was eliminated, including 100 feet (30 m) on the Canadian side. According to author Ginger Strand, the Horseshoe Falls is now entirely in Canada. Other sources say "most of" Horseshoe Falls is in Canada.

The island's western end is slowly being eroded by the falls, and the entire island will eventually disappear as the falls erode further upstream. The waters around Goat Island are relatively shallow and studded with islets and rocks, many of them scenes of dramatic rescues and rescue attempts.

== History ==
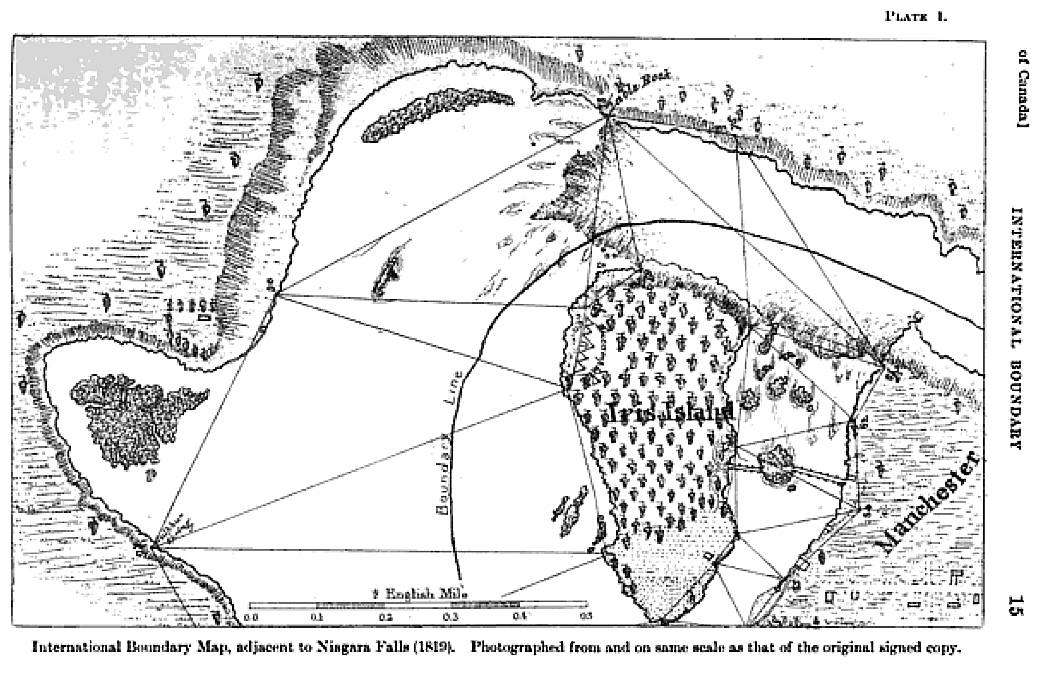
1819 Boundary Commission map of international border cutting through Horseshoe Falls. Goat Island is labeled Iris Island.

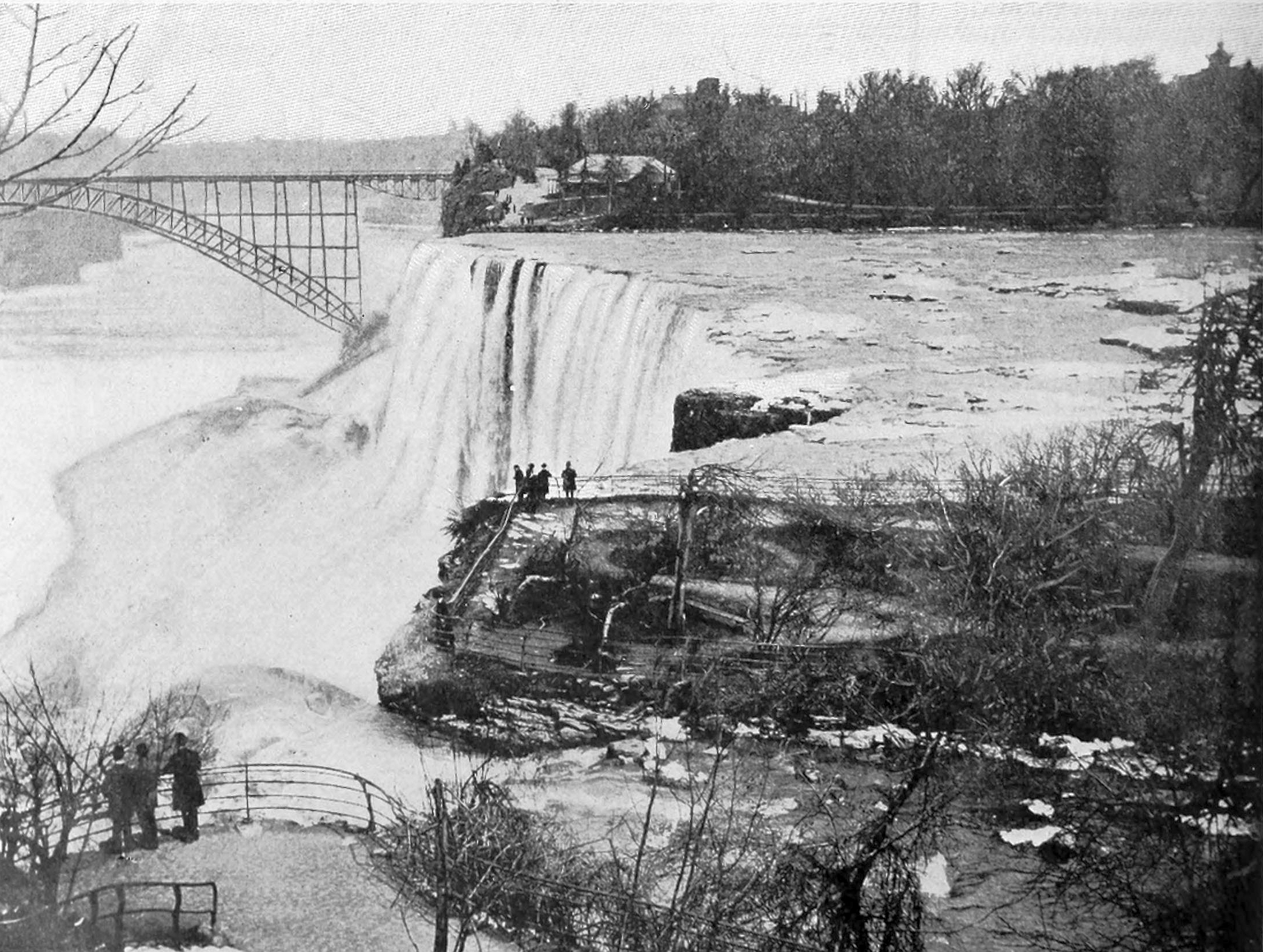
Damage from wind and ice on Goat Island, 1903

John Stedman—an early pioneer and miller—kept a herd of goats on the island. Upon returning to the island after the terrible winter of 1780, he found all but one of them had died, thus giving the island its name.

The island's preservation as parkland is due to the early efforts of Augustus Porter, who in the middle 19th century recognized the long-term value of the falls as a tourist attraction. Porter purchased the island and allowed a group of Tuscarora Native Americans to live on it and sell their crafts to the tourists who came to the falls by stagecoach and early railroads. In spite of pressure, Porter refused to tame the environment on the island. In 1817, he built a toll bridge to the island for tourists. It was swept away by ice, so another was built the following year downstream. Basil Hall called it "one of the most singular pieces of engineering in the world". Almost seven hundred feet long, it soon became the region's best-travelled walkway.

In 1885, the island was included in the Niagara Reservation State Park which is the oldest state park in the U.S.

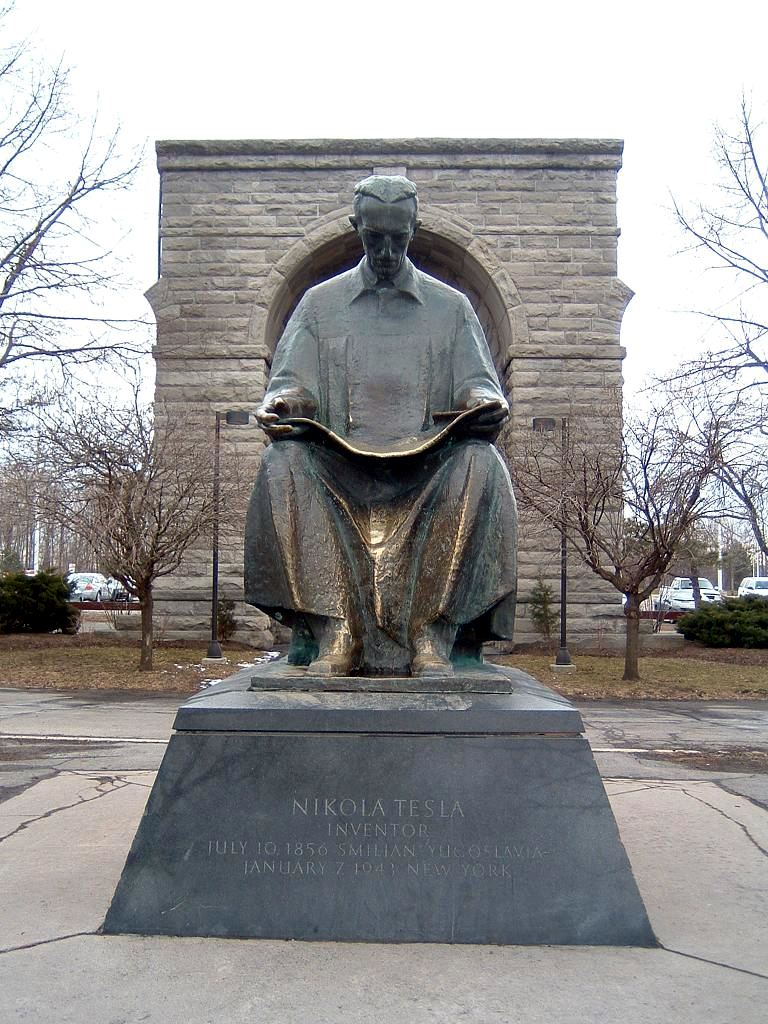
Tesla monument

=== Tesla Monument ===
The island is home to the Tesla Monument which honors the Serbian-American inventor, Nikola Tesla. The statue was given to the United States by the government of Yugoslavia in 1976. The statue's sculptor is Frano Kršinić (1897–1982), a renowned Yugoslav sculptor. In mid-2016, the statue was moved to Stedman's Bluff, the section of the island that overlooks the Bridal Veil Falls and the American Falls, to increase popularity.

== Botany ==
In 1879, landscape architect Frederick Law Olmsted, wrote that he had travelled four thousand miles throughout the continent "without finding elsewhere the same quality of forest beauty which was once abundant about the falls, and which is still to be observed in those parts of Goat Island where the original growth of trees and shrubs had not been disturbed..." Olmsted concluded that the spray from the Falls created a natural nursery for indigenous plant life. Since that time, regular mowing of the Goat Island meadow, heavy foot traffic, and the incursion of invasive species have significantly changed the island's floral landscape.

== In fiction ==
Part of H. G. Wells's 1908 novel The War in the Air is set on Goat Island. During the fictional invasion of the U.S. by the forces of Imperial Germany, depicted in the book, the protagonist is stranded on the island, with bridges to the mainland having been destroyed in the fighting, and is involved in a grim battle for survival with two equally stranded German soldiers.

== Image gallery ==
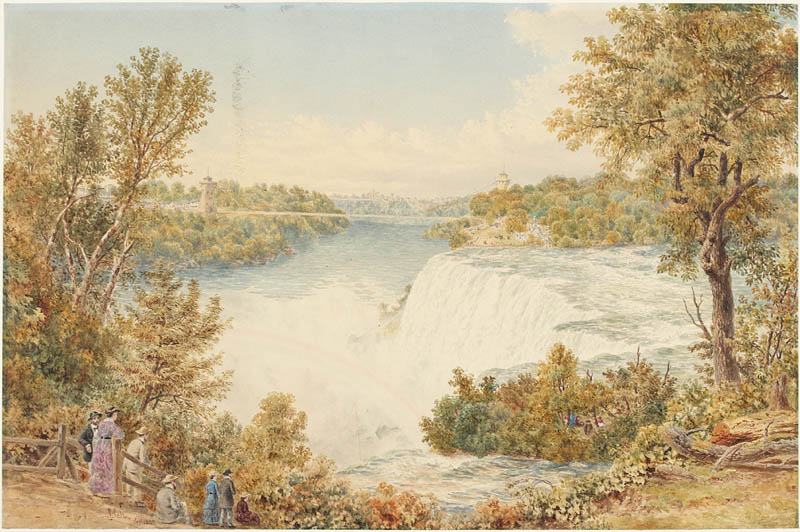
Niagara Falls from Goat Island (New York), 1882.

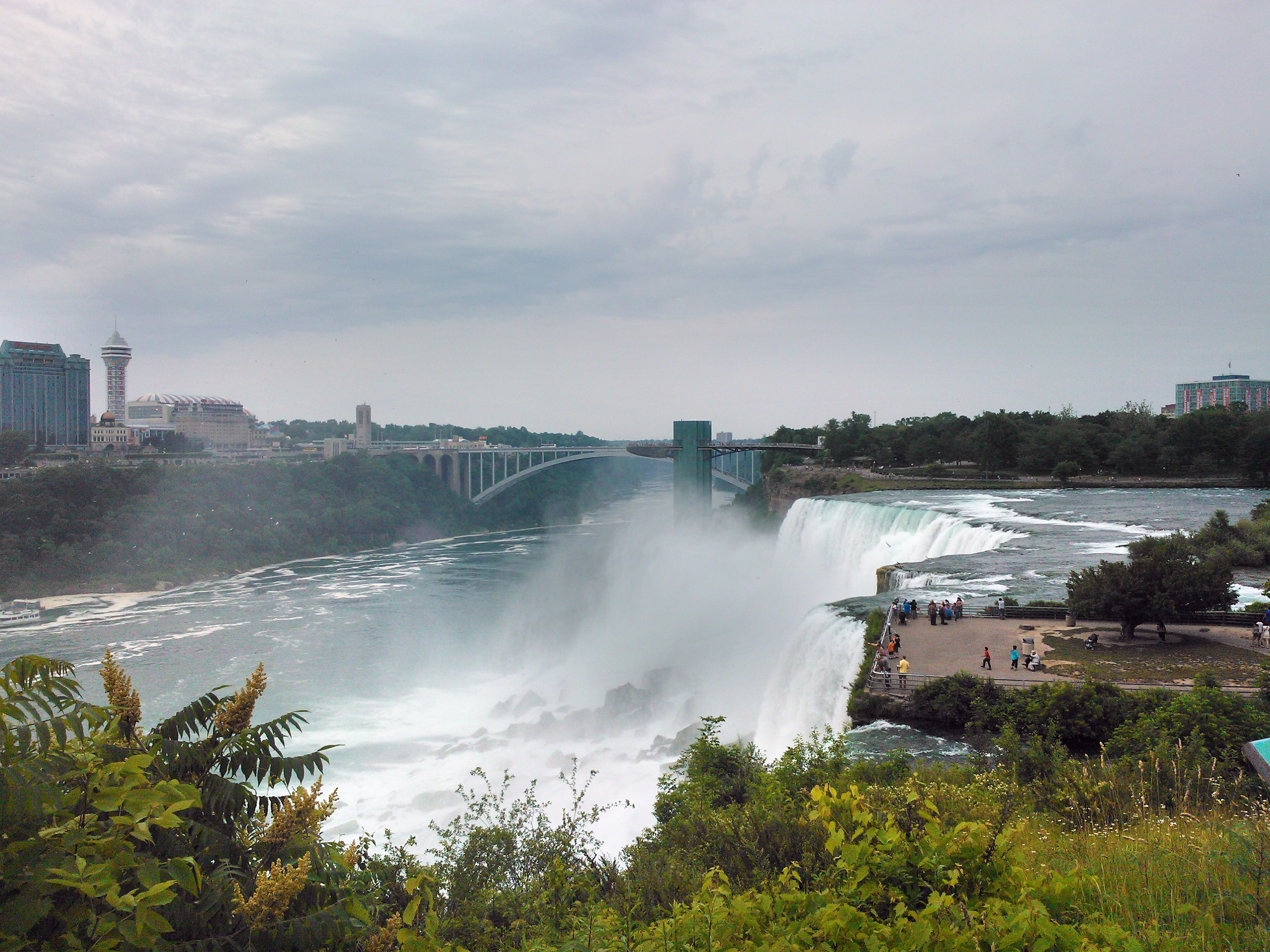
American Falls from Goat Island

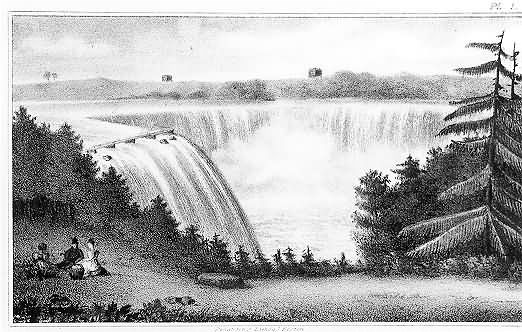
Horseshoe Falls from Goat Island (1832)

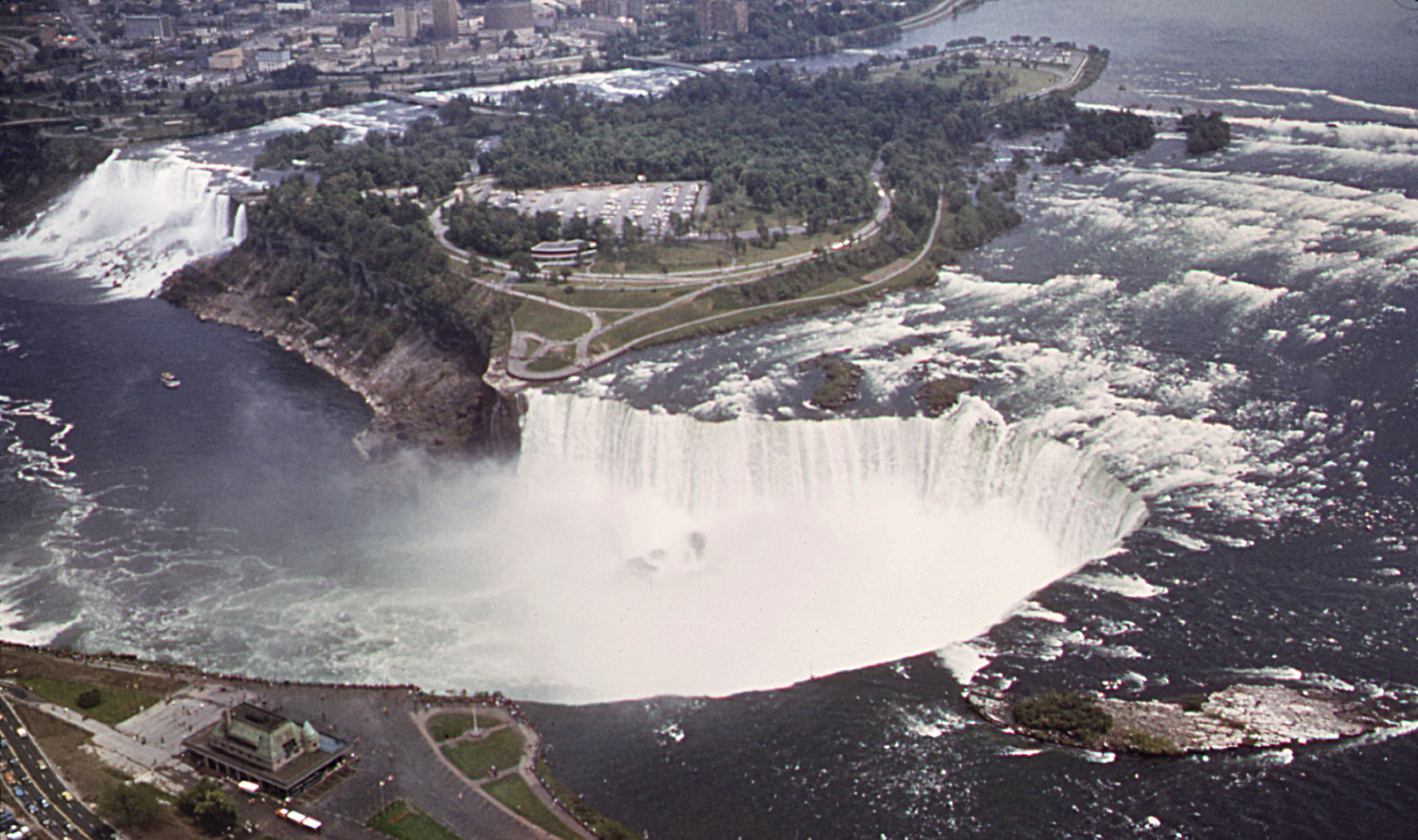
Goat Island between the two Falls (1973)

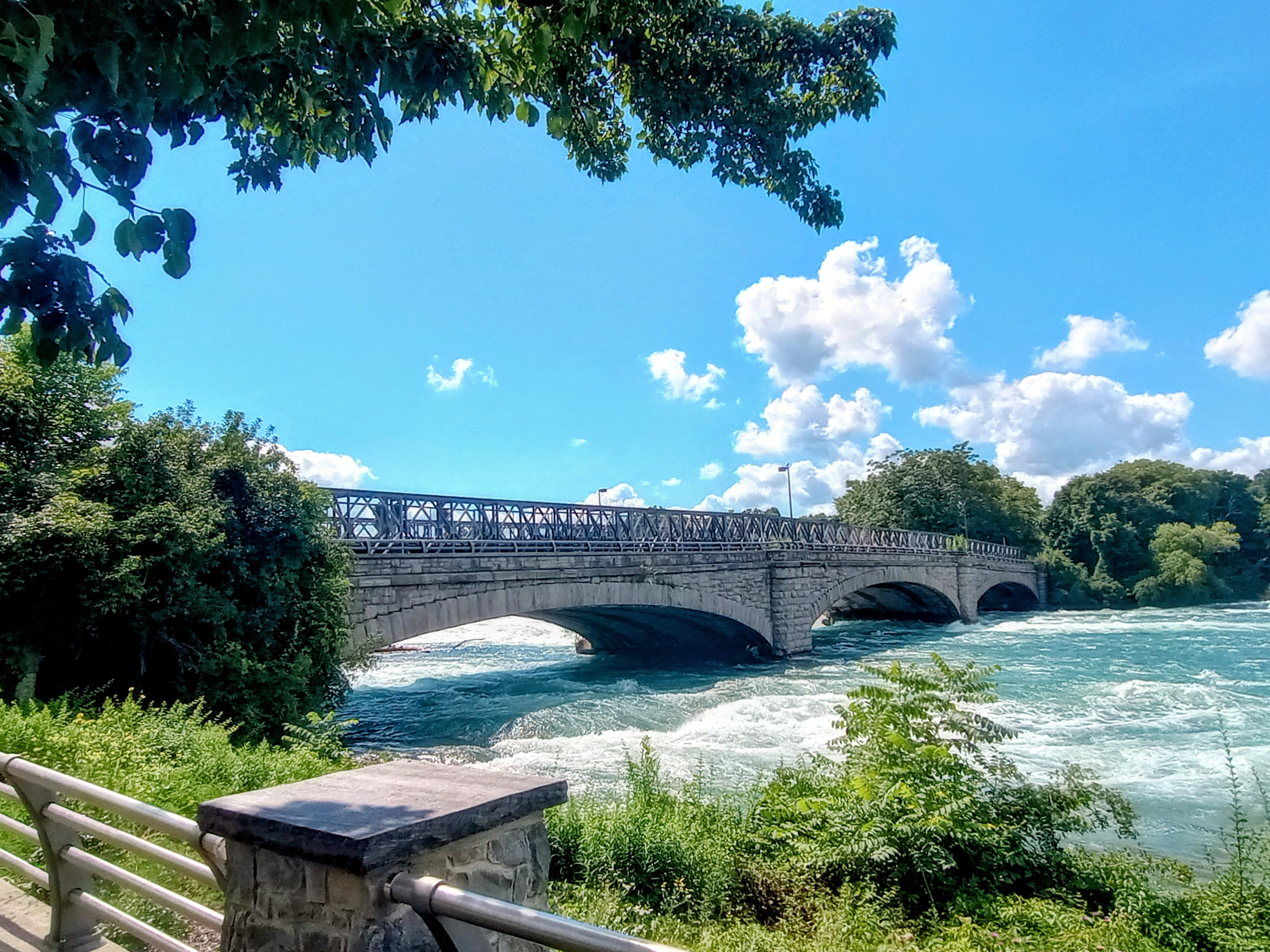
Goat Island Bridge

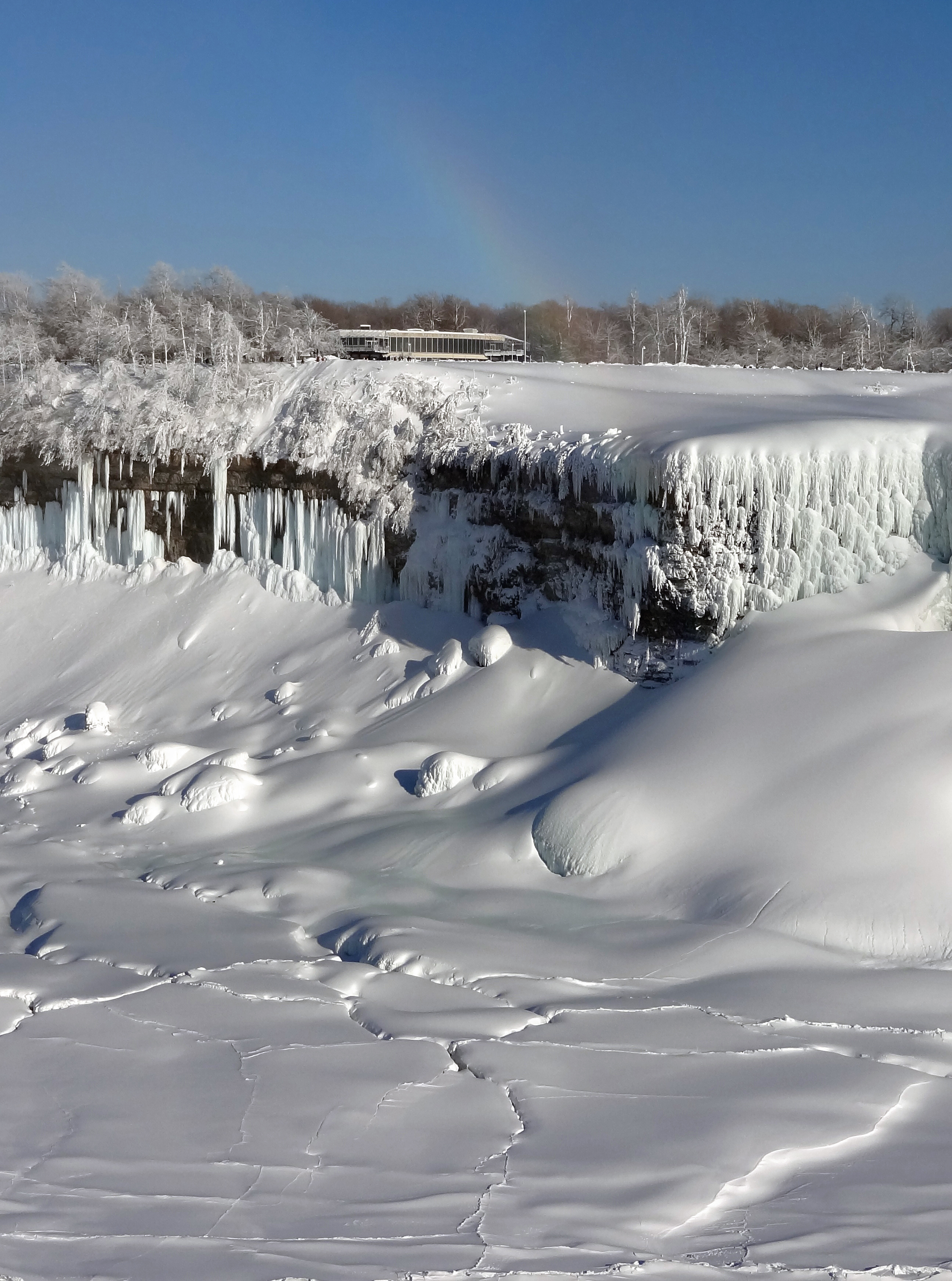
Goat Island tourist pavilion above frozen Niagara River
