= Bridal Veil Falls (Niagara Falls) =

Waterfall of the Niagara Falls

Coordinates: 43.083456°N 79.070709°W

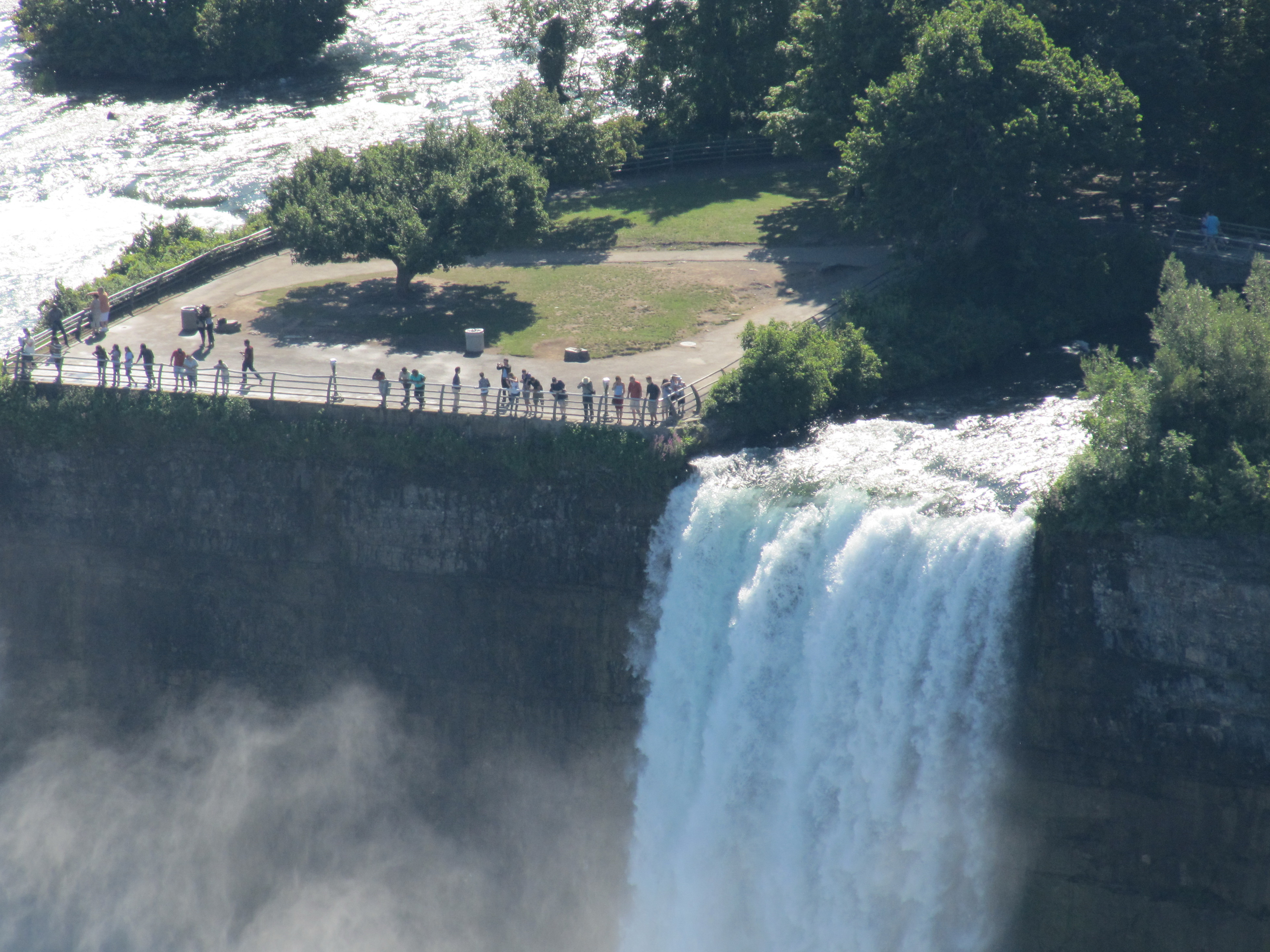
Bridal Veil Falls with Luna Island on the left

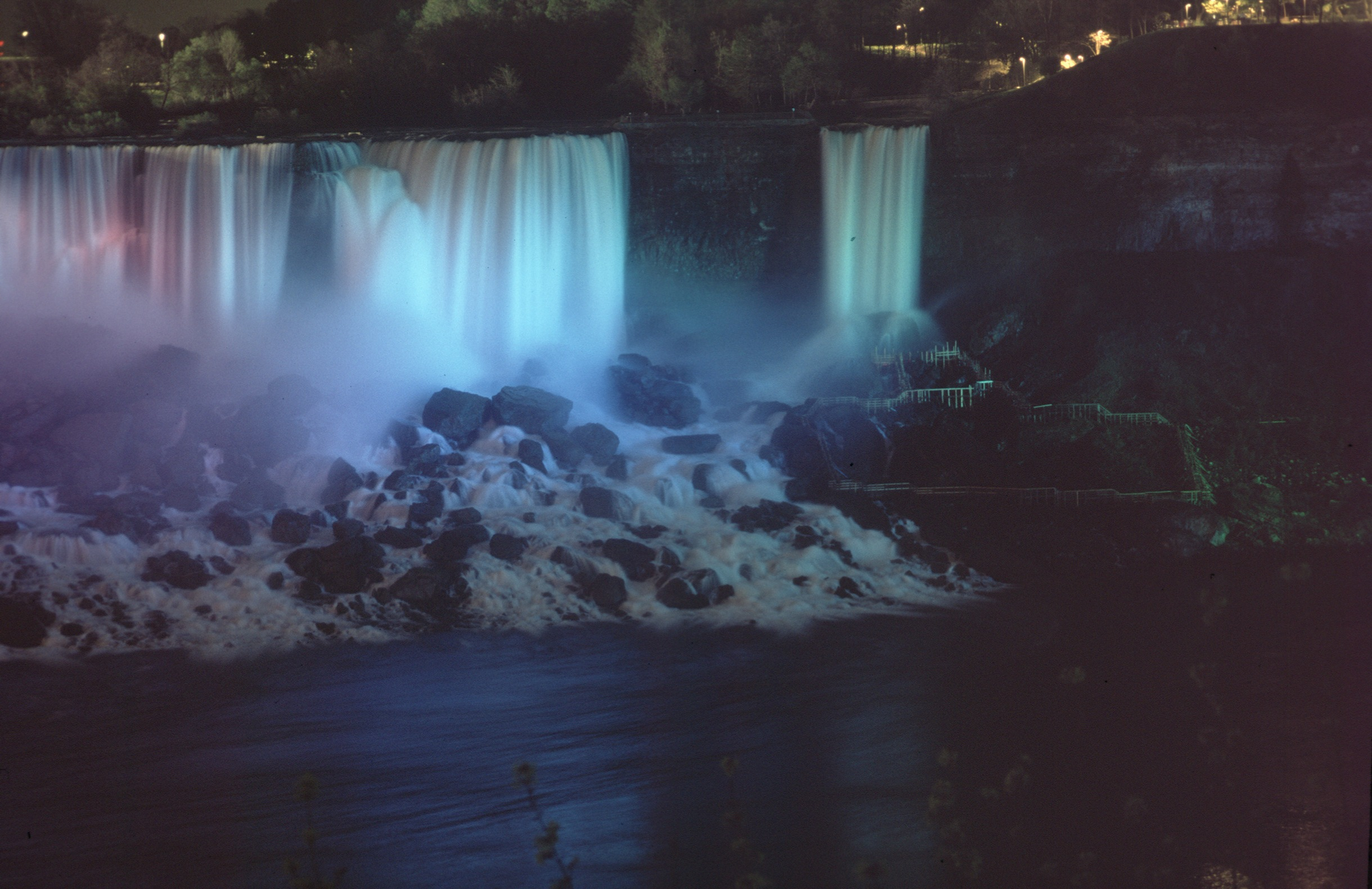
American Falls (left) and Bridal Veil Falls at night

Bridal Veil Falls and the American Falls from the Cave of the Winds

Bridal Veil Falls is the smallest of the three waterfalls that make up Niagara Falls. It is located on the United States side in New York state. Luna Island separates it from the American Falls and Goat Island separates it from the Horseshoe Falls. Bridal Veil Falls faces to the northwest and has a crest 56 ft (17 m) wide.

Bridal Veil is similar in appearance to American Falls, starting with a vertical fall of 78 ft (24 m) followed by the water violently descending the talus boulders to the Maid of the Mist pool 103 ft (31 m) below. The total vertical drop is 181 ft (55 m). The crest elevation of the Falls is 508 ft (155 m).

The Cave of the Winds attraction allows visitors to walk up to the base of Bridal Veil Falls. A pedestrian bridge crosses from Goat Island to Luna Island several yards (meters) upstream from the crest of the falls.

The waterfall has also been known in the past as Luna Falls and Iris Falls.

== See also ==
- List of waterfalls
