= Cave of the Winds (New York) =

Former natural cave behind Niagara Falls

Coordinates: 43.083417°N 79.070991°W

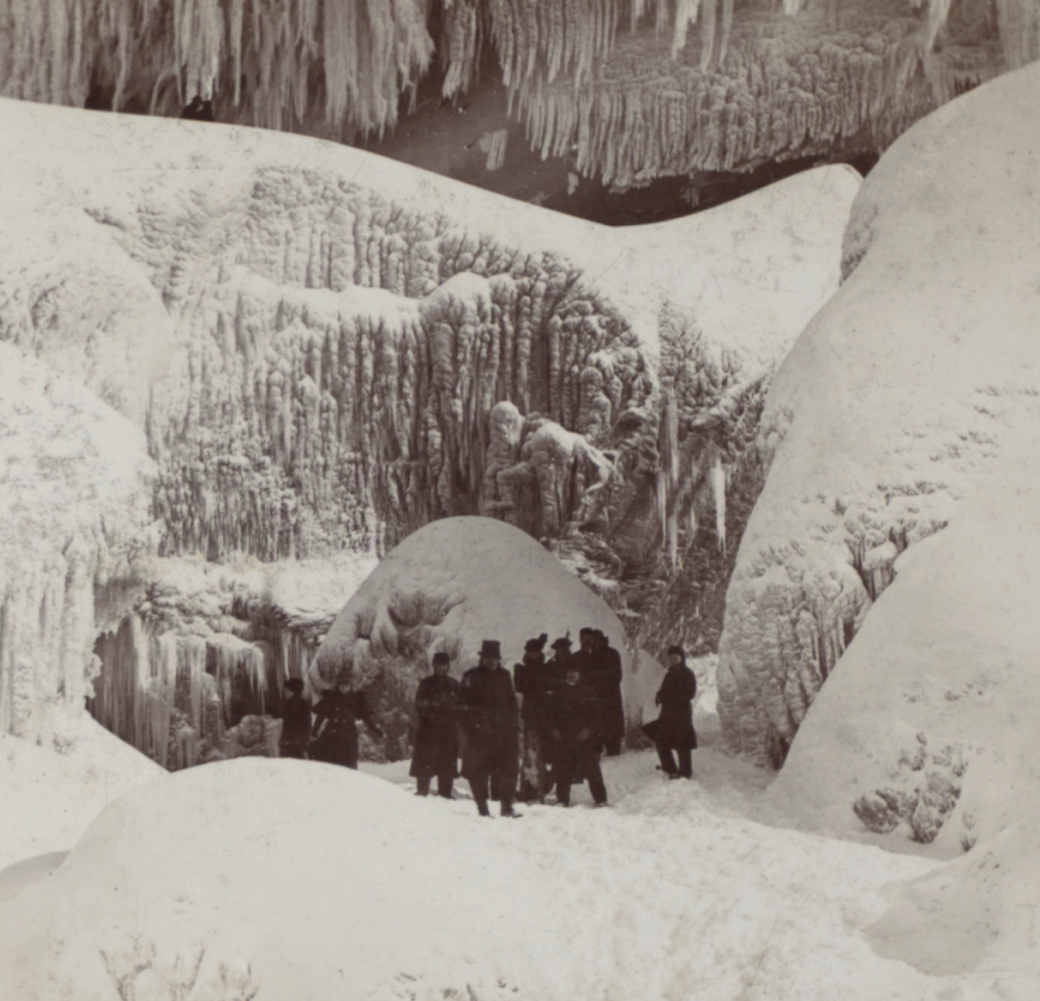
19th century photograph of the entrance to Cave of the Winds

The Cave of the Winds was a natural cave behind Bridal Veil Falls at the Niagara Falls. The cave was some 130 feet (40 m) high, 100 feet (30 m) wide and 30 feet (9 m) in depth. It was discovered in 1834, and originally dubbed Aeolus's Cave, after the Greek god of winds.

Guided tours began officially in 1841, through Goat Island and descending down a staircase closer to the falls, into the cave. A rock fall closed the tour in 1920. It officially reopened in 1924, bringing visitors to the front of the Bridal Veil instead of behind it, on a series of decks and walkways. Tropical storm-like conditions can be experienced, as winds can reach up to 68 mph (109 km/h) underneath the falls. The cave was obliterated in a massive 1954 rockfall and subsequent dynamiting of a dangerous overhang.

== Modern attraction ==
Today, the "Cave of the Winds" is the name of a tourist attraction near the same site. An elevator takes people from the area between the American and Canadian Falls down to the level of the Niagara River at the base of the American Falls. A series of redwood decks and platforms allow sightseers to walk right up to the base of the Bridal Veil Falls with water crashing down right on them and flowing beneath the decking.

The decking is removed each fall due to the potential damage caused by ice buildup at the falls and re-installed each spring by park officials for sightseers to enjoy the experience. The decking is not secured to the rocks below by bolts or other construction materials; the wood beam supports are simply wedged into the rock crevices.

== Images ==
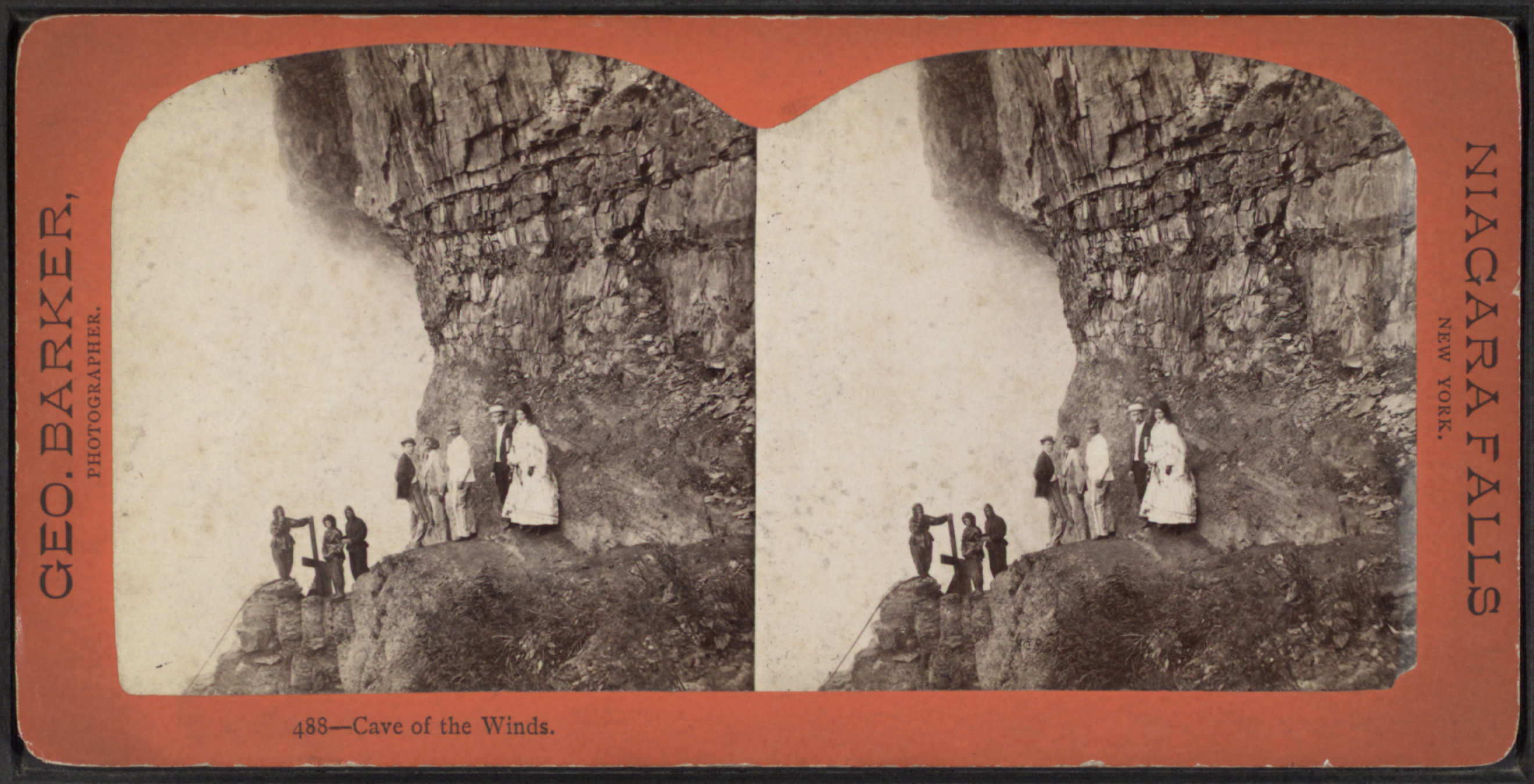
19th century stereoscopic image of the cave

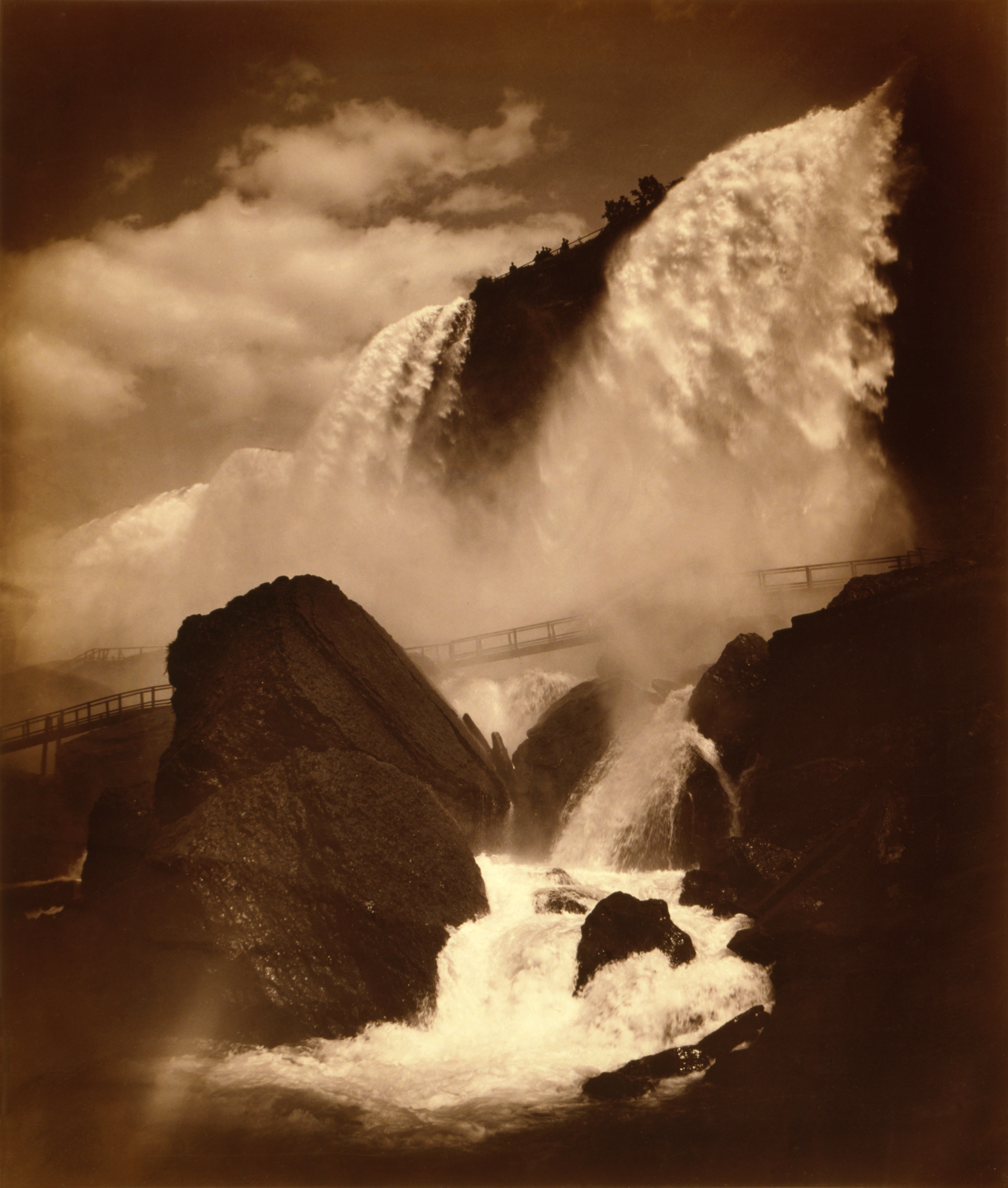
Cave of the Winds, photograph by George Barker, 1888

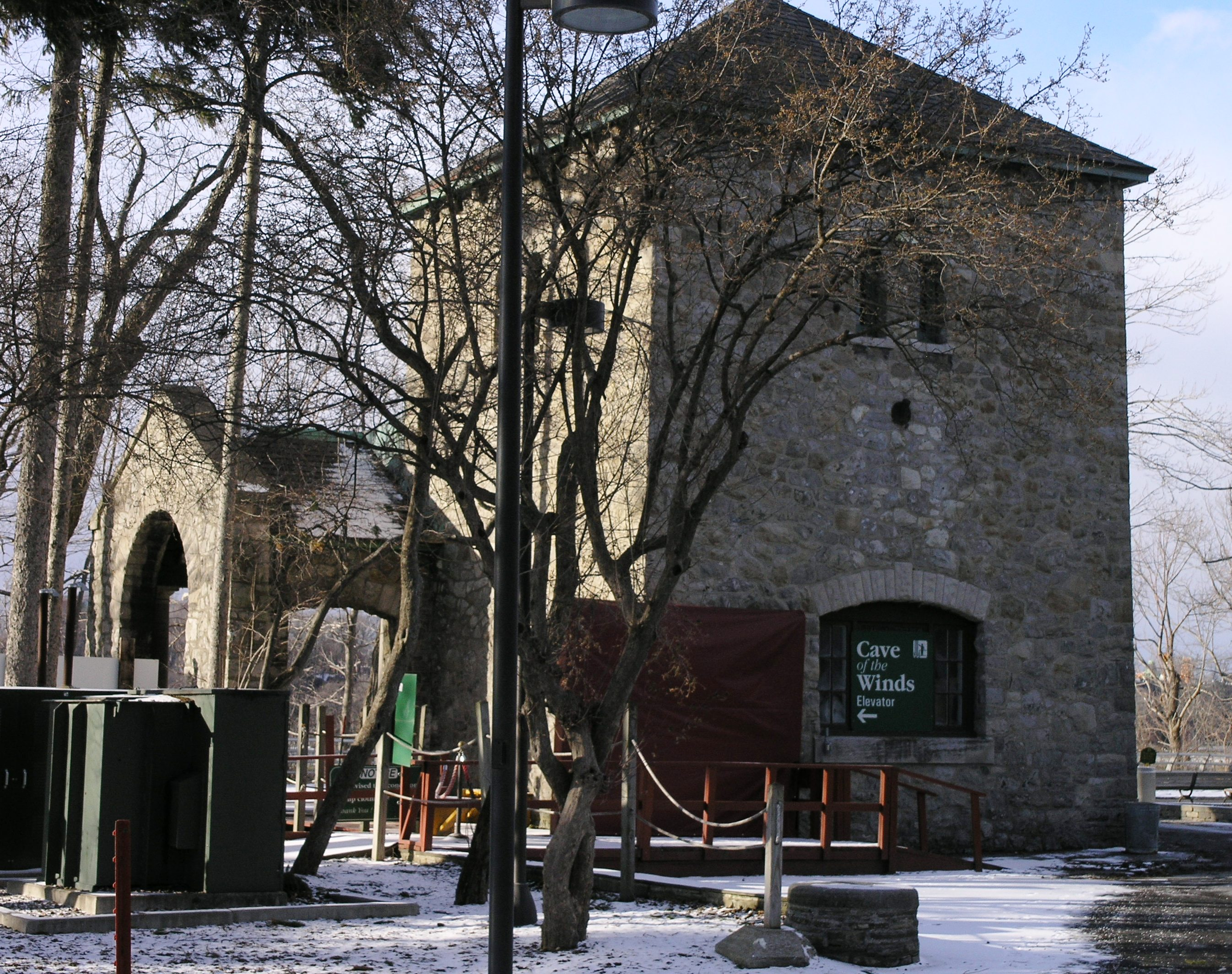
Cave of the Winds elevator building

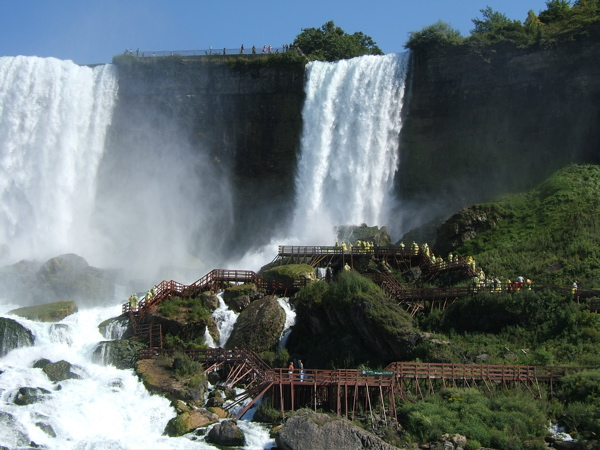
Cave of the Winds tour

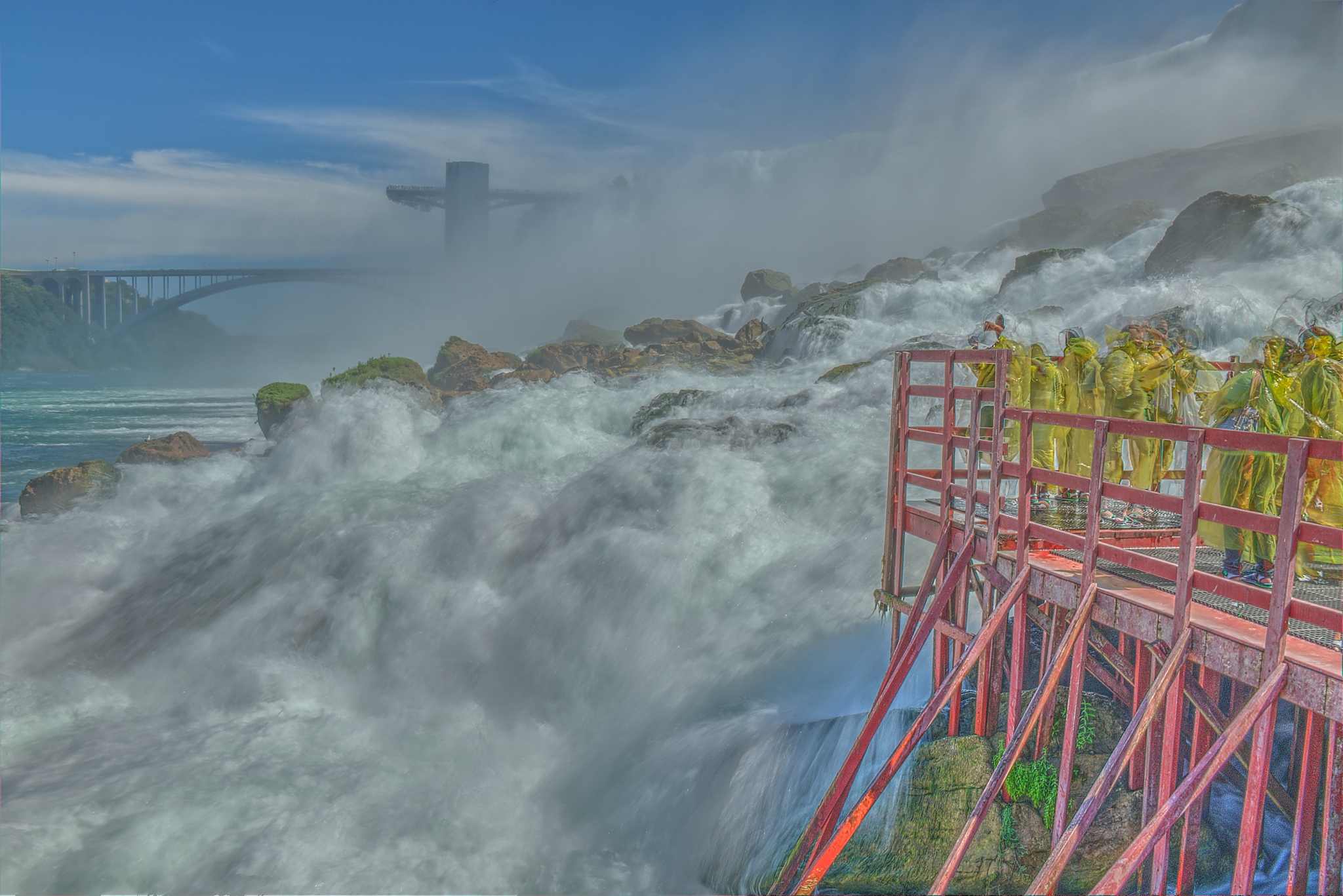
Redwood decking at the base of Bridal Veil Falls

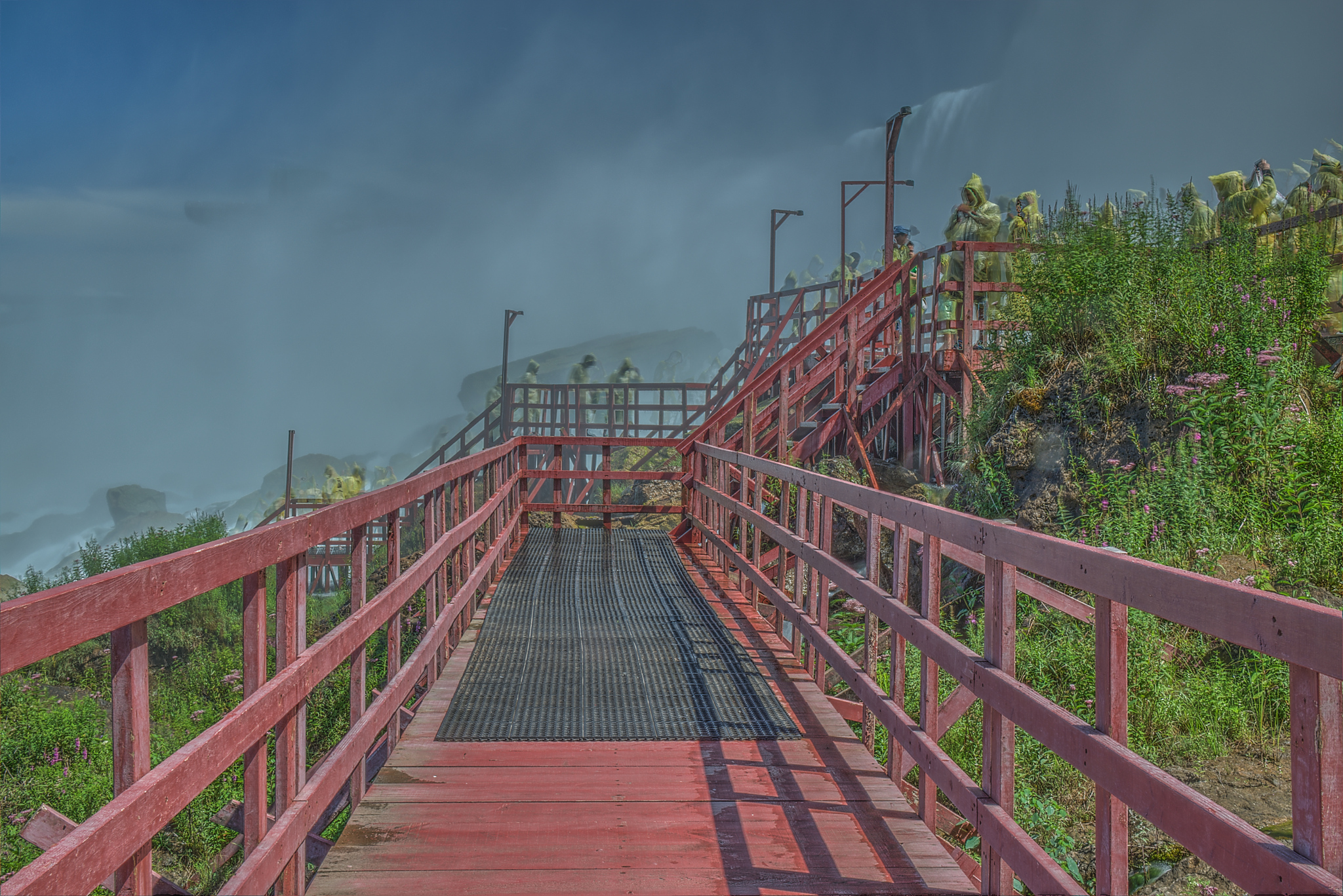
Detail of redwood decks
