= American Falls =

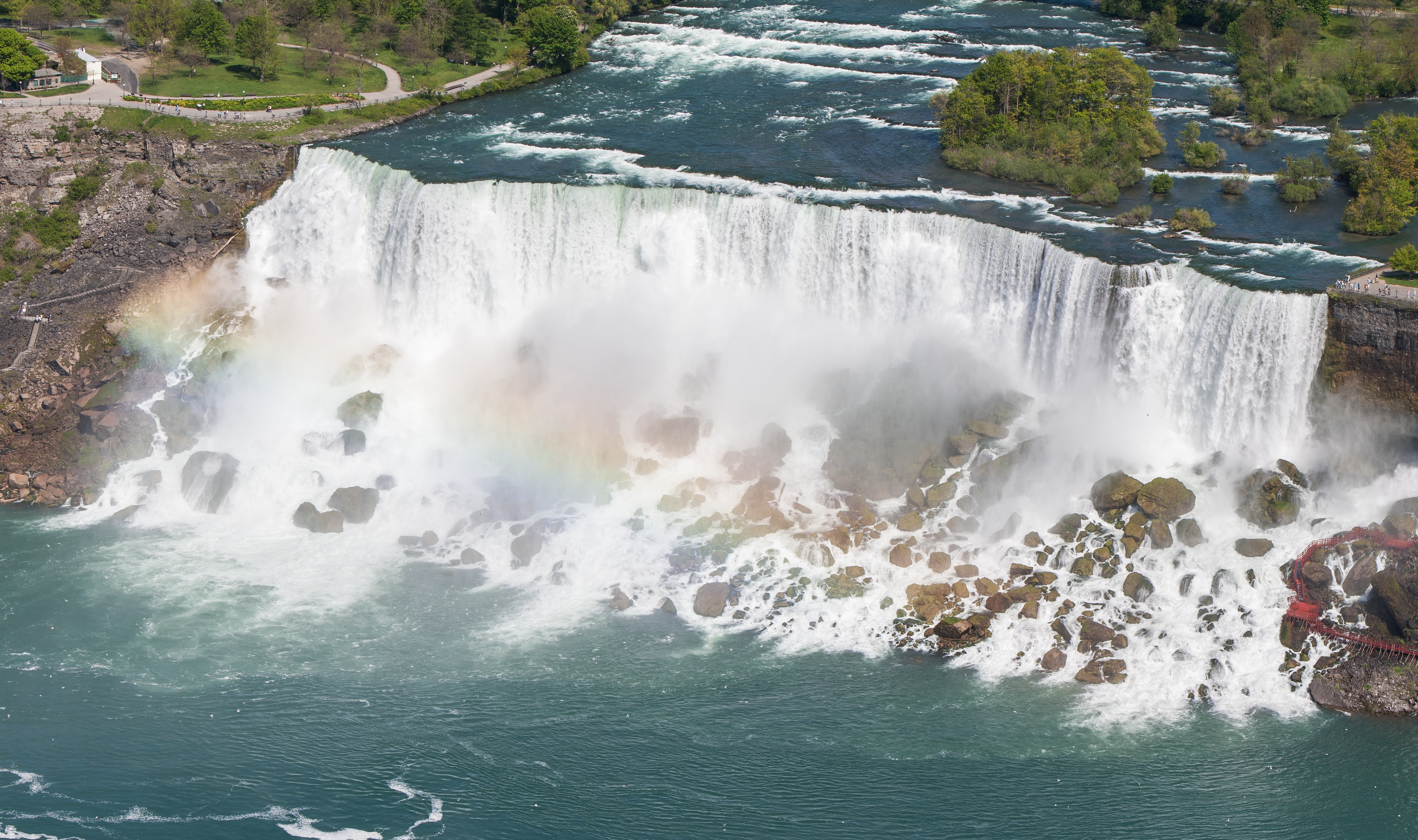
- Interactive map of American Falls
- Location: Niagara Falls, New York, U.S.
- Coordinates: 43.085°N 79.070°W
- Type: Cataract
- Total height: 110 ft (34 m)
- Total width: 950 ft (290 m)
- Watercourse: Niagara River

The American Falls is the second largest of the three waterfalls that together are known as Niagara Falls on the Niagara River along the Canada–United States border. Unlike the much larger Horseshoe Falls, of which approximately 90% is in Ontario, Canada, and 10% in the U.S. state of New York, the American Falls is entirely within the United States.

== Characteristics ==
The falls receive approximately 11% of the flow from Niagara River, with most of the rest going over Horseshoe Falls, from which it is separated by Goat Island. It has a straight-line crest width of about 830 feet (250 m). If measured along the jagged lip of the falls, the crest is about 950 feet (290 m) long (but see coastline paradox). The torrent of water passing over the crest of the falls is about 2 feet (0.61 m) deep.

The height of the American Falls ranges between 70 and 110 feet (21–34 m). This measurement is taken from the top of the Falls to top of the rock pile (talus). The height of the Falls from the top of the Falls to the river is 188 feet (57 m).

Visitors can view the falls from a steep angle on the American side, where it is possible to approach to within several meters of the edge of the falls. They can view the falls from the bank of the river, as well as on Goat Island and Luna Island, which are accessible by a pedestrian bridge that crosses the rapids of the Niagara River upstream from the falls. The falls are viewable head-on from the Canadian side in Niagara Falls, Ontario.

The ledge of the American Falls is shaped in a modified "W" form, caused by numerous rock falls over the past 150 years which have resulted in the huge mound of rock at its base. The most notable recent rockfall occurred in 1954 with the collapse of Prospect Point to the north.

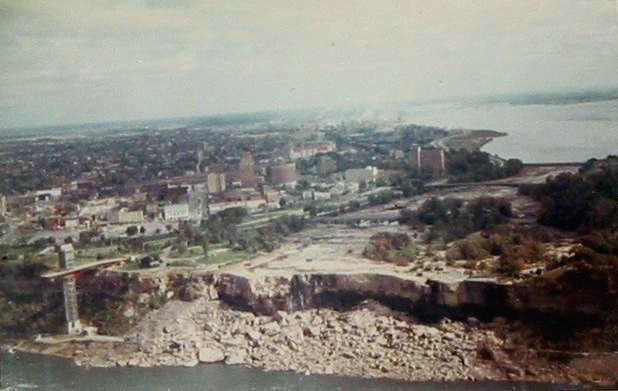
American Falls diverted during erosion control efforts in 1969

To survey the rockfall and determine how to prevent the falls from becoming a series of rapids, the U.S. Army Corps of Engineers blocked the flow of water over the American Falls from June to November 1969. Results conflict as to whether tourist attendance that season was higher or lower than normal. Attendance increases were likely due to the news the cataract was dried off; decreases in tourists could be attributed to people believing both cataracts (the American and Horseshoe Falls) were dewatered. By December 1969, water was flowing over the American Falls again. In the mid‑1970s, it was decided not to make alterations to the rockwall, citing the trend to allow nature to take its course.

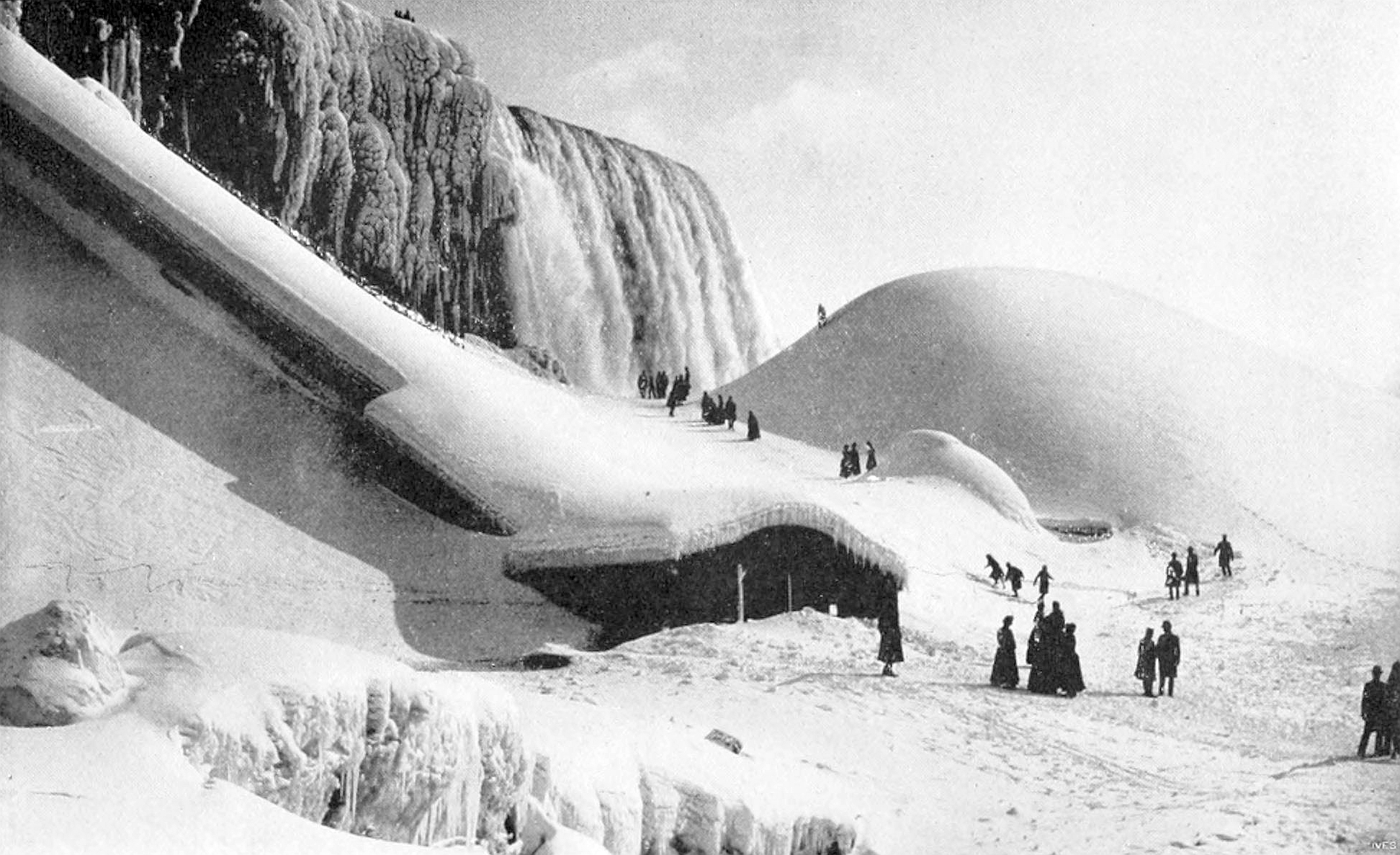
Tourists on the ice at the base of the American Falls, 1891

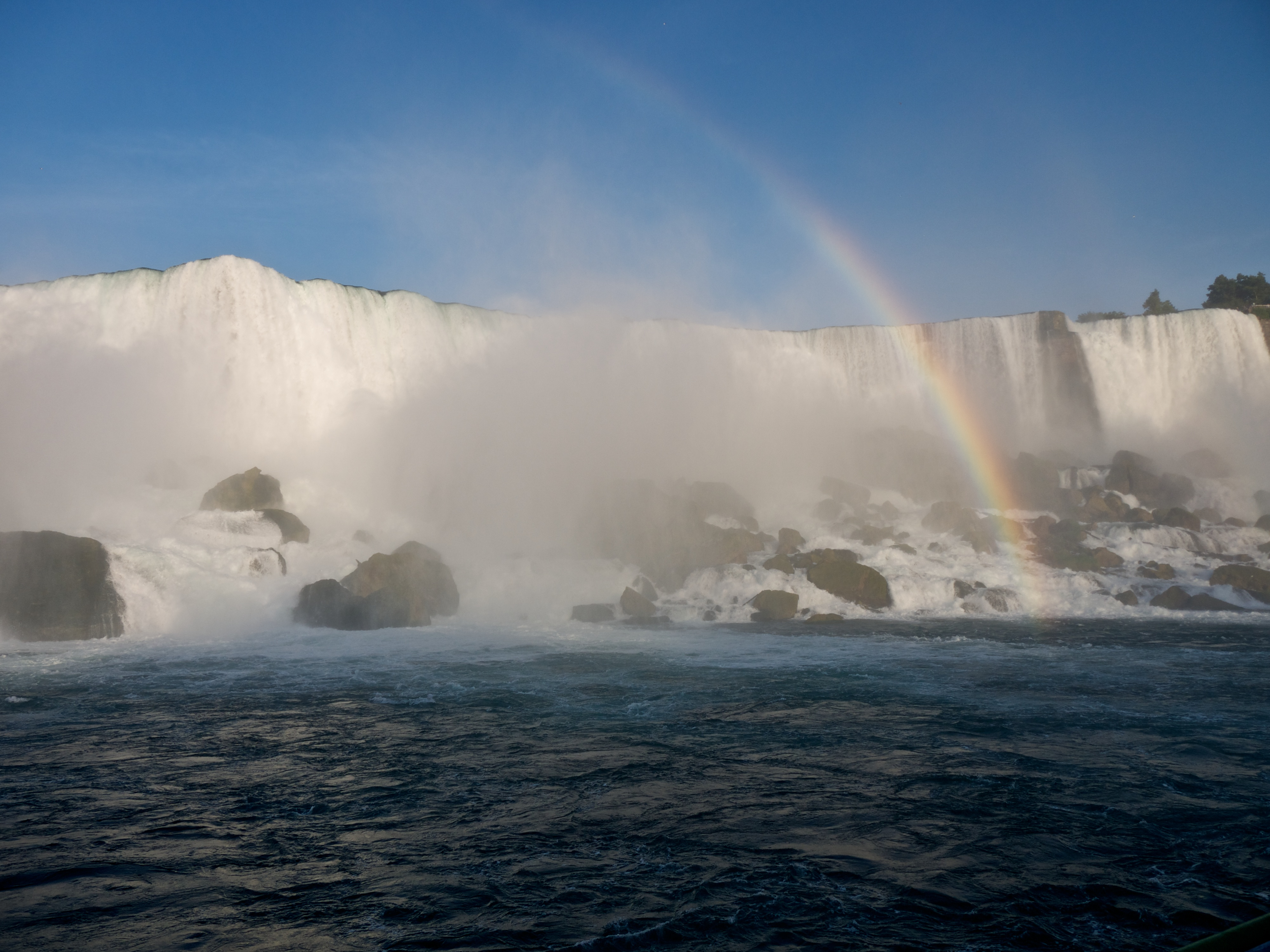
American Falls

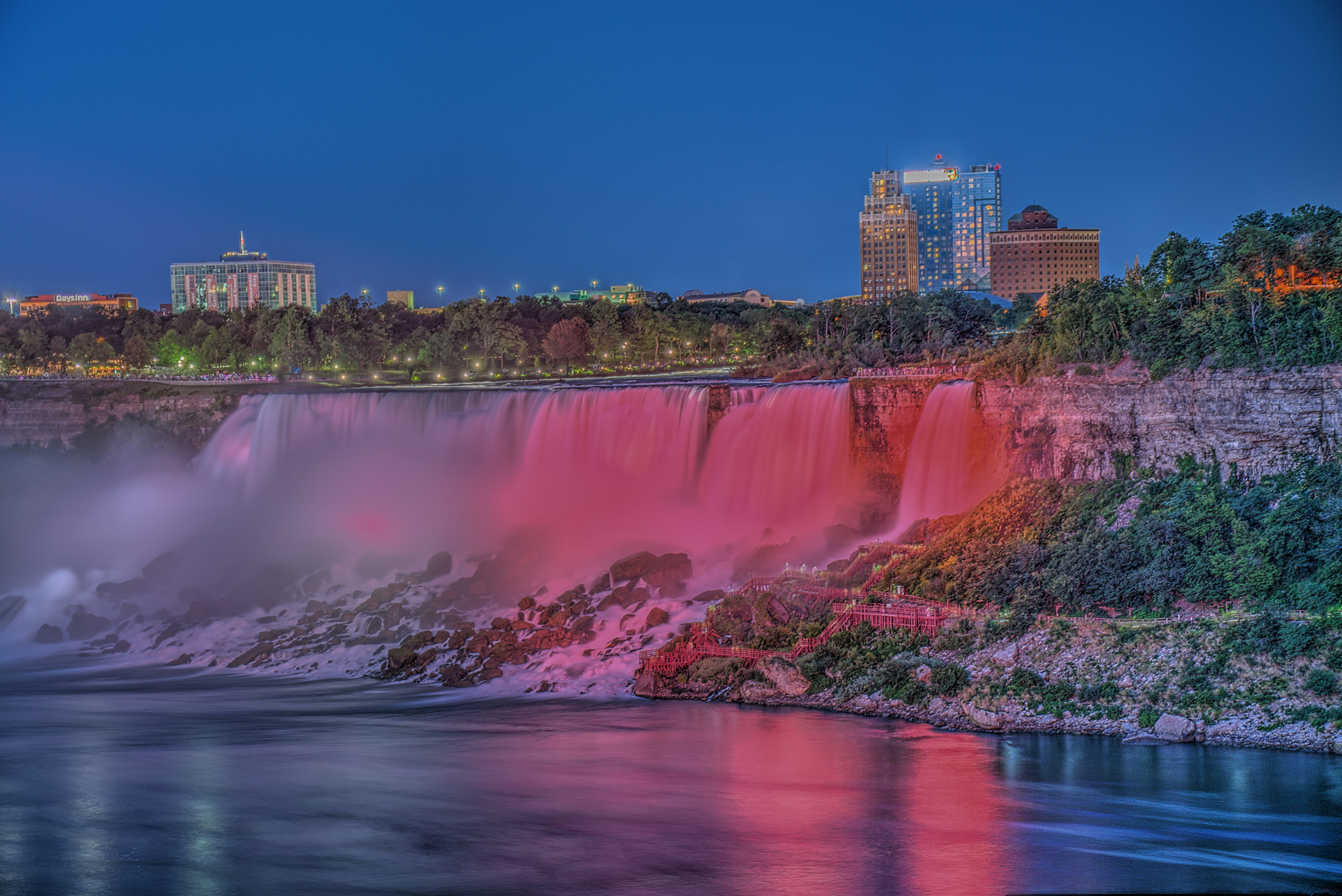
American Falls at night

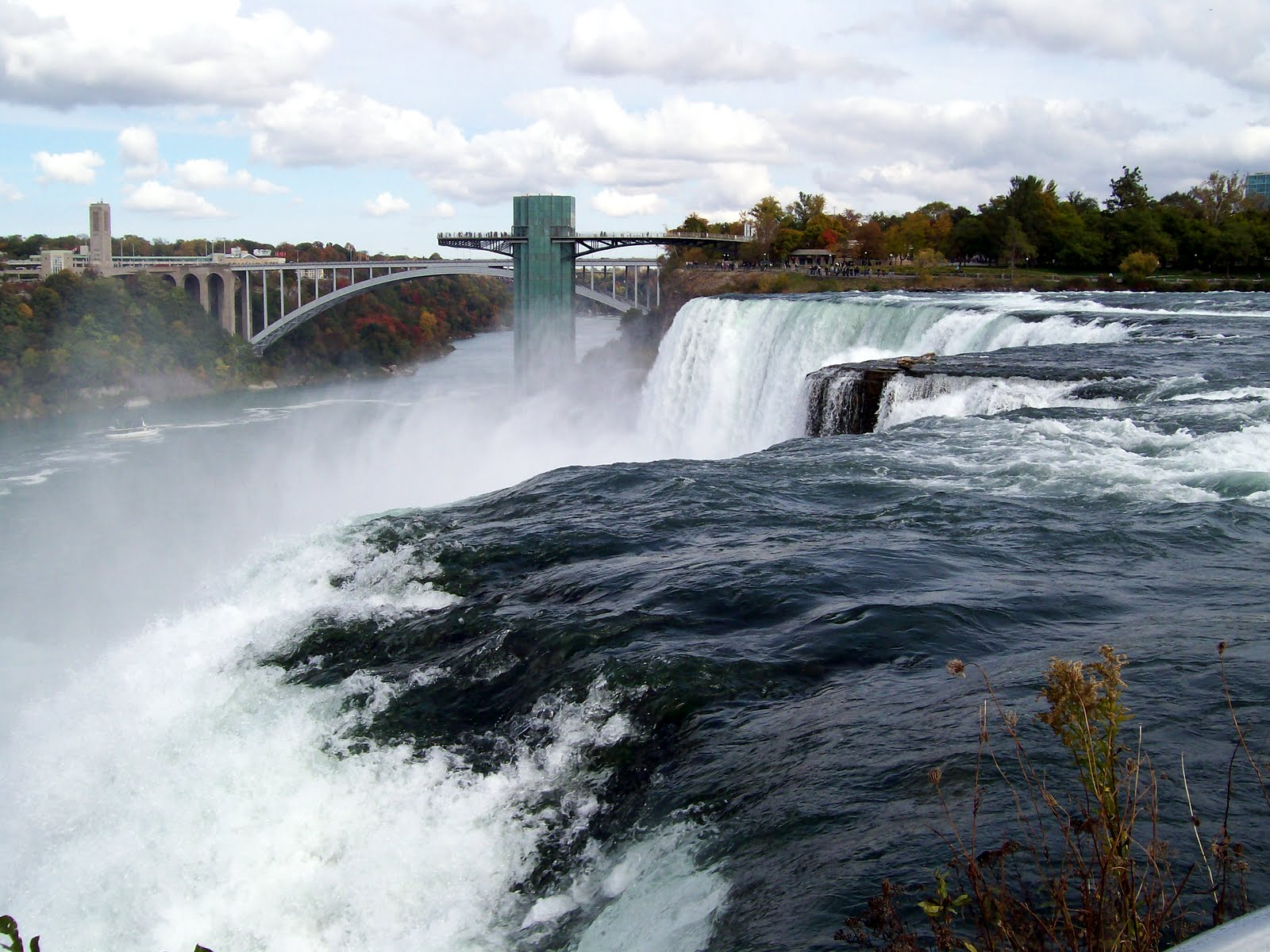
Looking up the Niagara Gorge across the American Falls

== See also ==
- List of waterfalls
