= List of people who have gone over Niagara Falls =

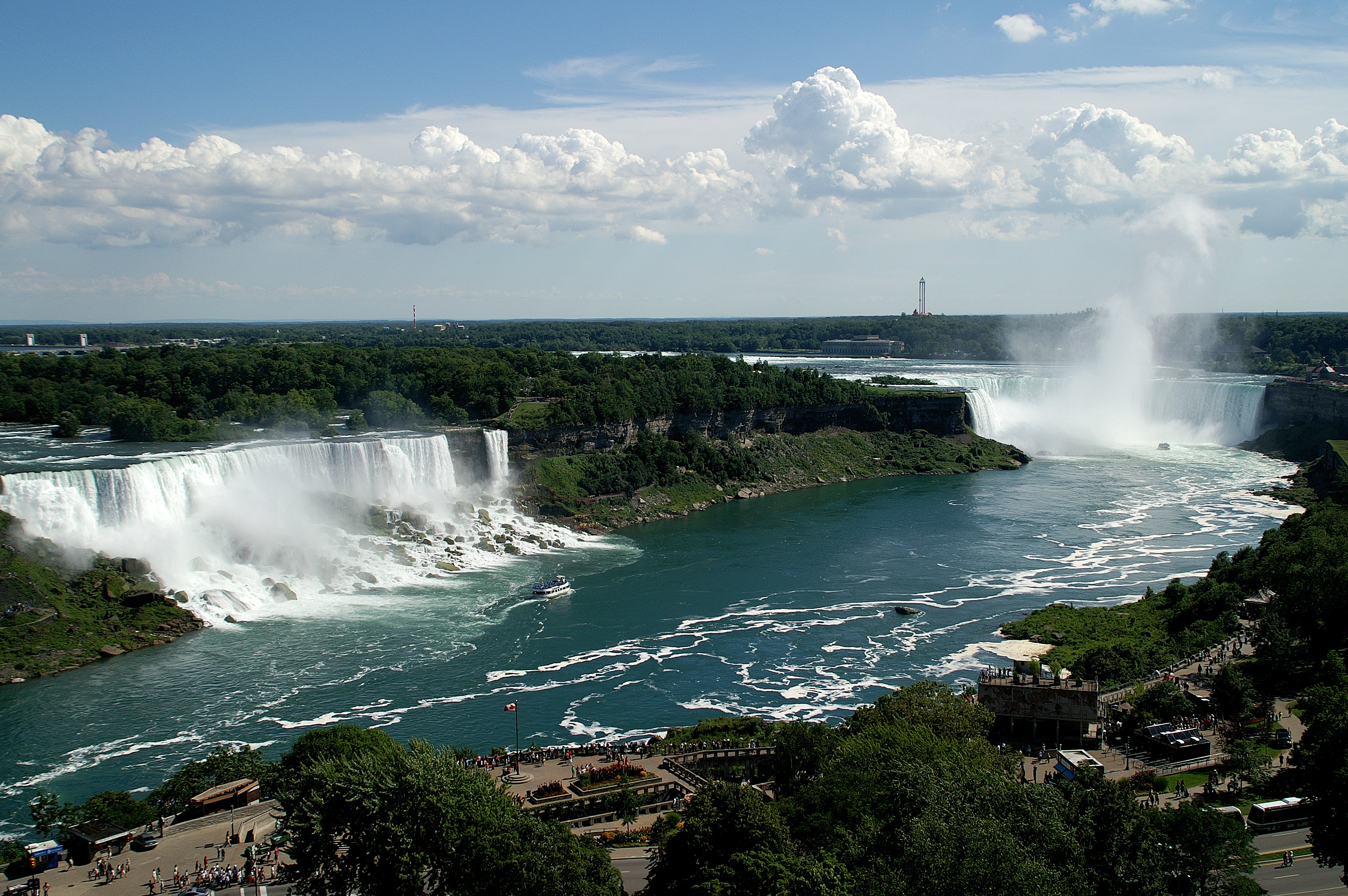
Niagara Falls as viewed from the Canadian side of the river. The three individual falls from left to right are American Falls, Bridal Veil Falls, and Horseshoe Falls.

Hundreds of people have gone over Niagara Falls, either intentionally (as stunts or suicide attempts) or accidentally. The first recorded person to survive going over the falls was school teacher Annie Edson Taylor, who in 1901 successfully completed the stunt inside an oak barrel. In the following 125 years, thousands of people have been swept over the falls but only sixteen people have reportedly survived the feat. All instances of people having survived the trip over the falls have been over the Canadian Horseshoe Falls. Following the death of one daredevil in 1951, stunting at Niagara Falls has been illegal and subject to fines of up to $25,000 USD.

== History ==
A number of people have gained notoriety from their stunts, both successful and fatal. The first documented survival of a trip over Niagara Falls was that of school teacher Annie Edson Taylor in 1901. Taylor went over the falls in an oak barrel as part of a stunt in an attempt to bring her financial security. Other daredevil attempts have been made by Bobby Leach, Charles Stephens, Jean Lussier, Karel Soucek, and Steve Trotter. In 1903, baseball Hall of Famer Ed Delahanty died after accidentally going over the falls while intoxicated. Following the death of daredevil William "Red" Hill, Jr. in 1951, Ontario Premier Leslie Frost issued an order to the Niagara Parks Commission to arrest anyone found to be performing stunts at the falls. Both Canadian and American authorities began to issue fines for daredevils at the falls; as of 2011, the fines are $10,000 CAD (approximately $7,700 USD) in Canada, or US$25,000 (approximately $32,800 CAD) in the United States.

When the American Falls was temporarily diverted in 1969, two bodies were found; the identities were not disclosed. There have been no recorded cases of people surviving the trip over the American Falls.

=== Statistics ===
Between 1958 and 1967, an average of 7.1 people per year went over the falls. From 1978 to 1988, the average was 12.8 per year. Other reports suggest an annual average between 20 and 30. By 1900, approximately 1,000 people were believed to have gone over the falls in acts of suicide. In 2011, it was reported that 5,000 bodies had been recovered from the foot of the falls since 1850.

The majority of deaths are suicides, and most take place from the Canadian Horseshoe Falls. Many of these suicides are not publicized by officials. Of the daredevil attempts, the survival rate is approximately 75%.

== Incidents ==
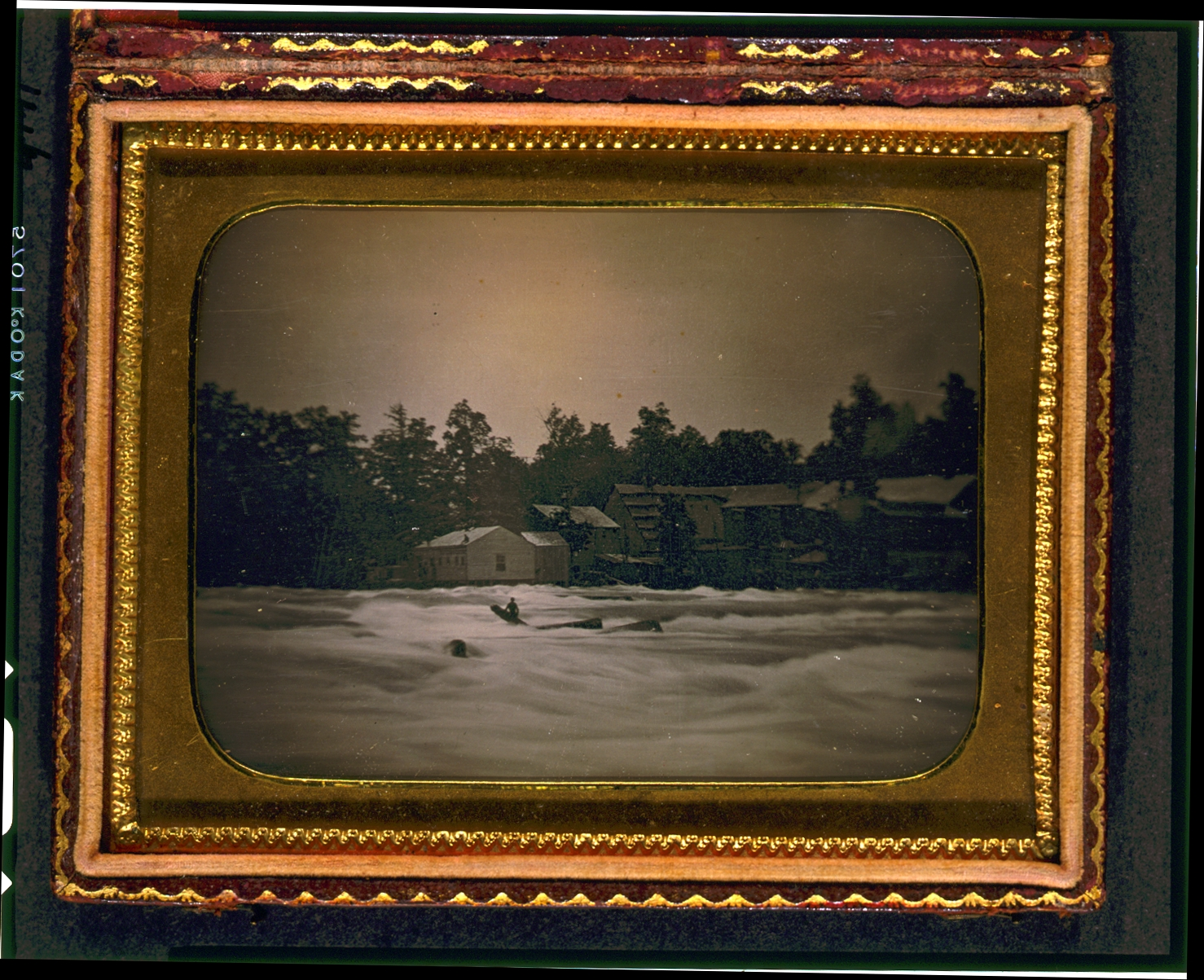
Joseph Avery stranded in Niagara River

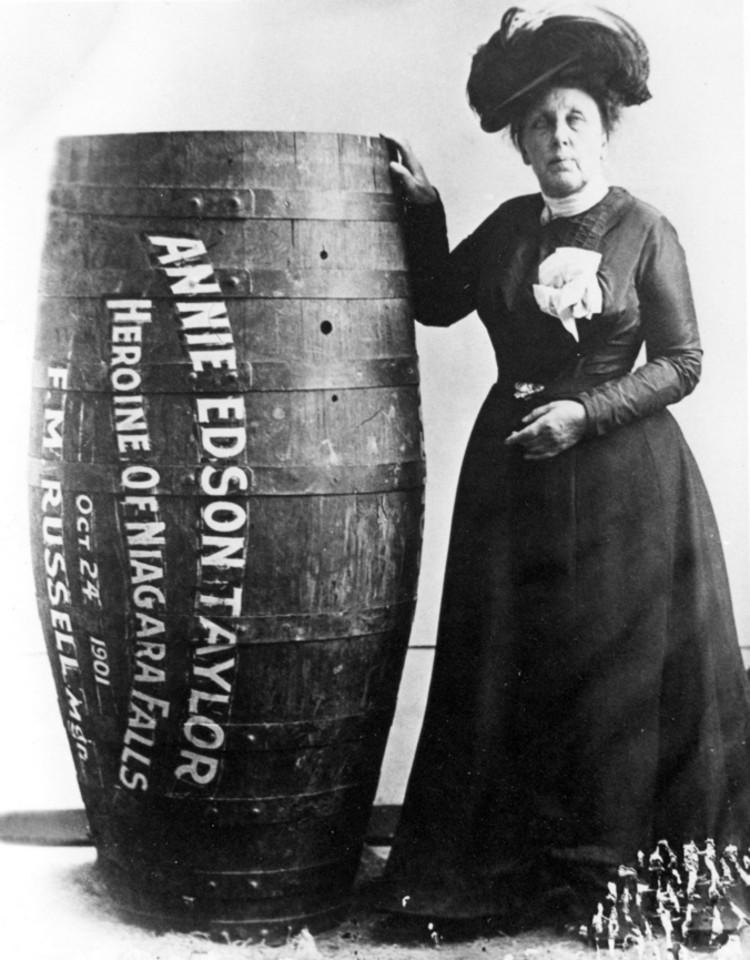
Annie Edson Taylor posing with her wooden barrel (1901)

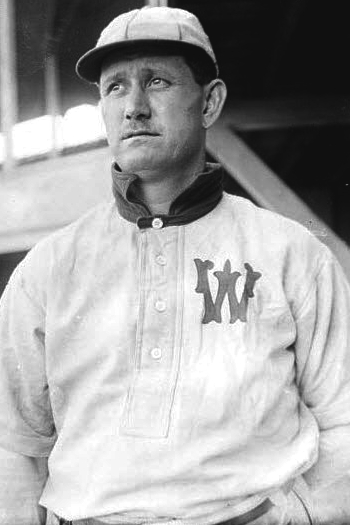
Ed Delahanty with the Washington Senators in 1903

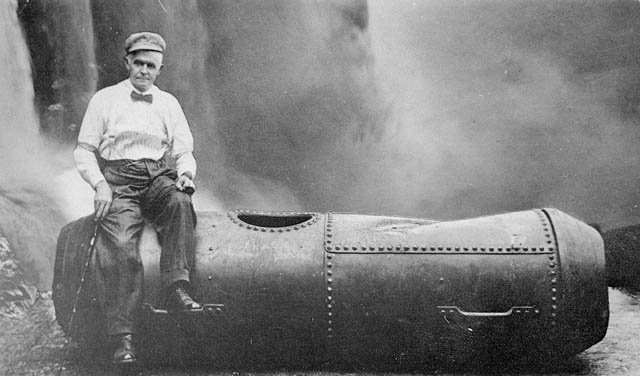
Bobby Leach posing with his steel barrel (1911)

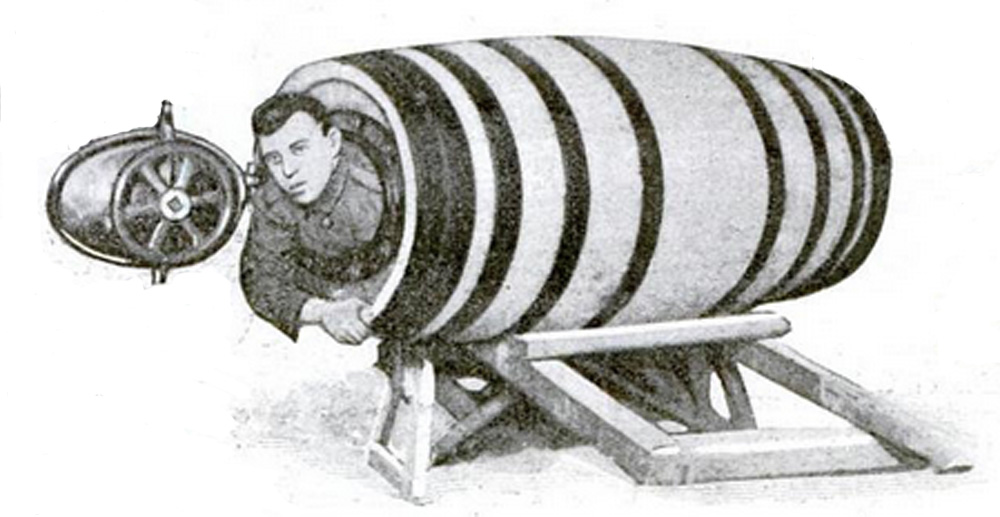
Charles Stephens in his barrel, prior to his fatal July 1920 attempt

Date	Individual	Fate	Falls	Cause	Circumstances
19 July 1853	Joseph Avery (Note: Other accounts Avery's first name as Sam)	Fatality	American Falls	accident	Avery and two other men had been working on a scow and drinking, and attempted to row from Goat Island to the mainland when their boat capsized. The two other men went over the American Falls immediately, while Avery grabbed onto tree roots growing from a rock just east of Chapin Island and weathered the current for eighteen hours. Several attempts were made at rescue the next morning and a boat tethered to the Goat Island (Note: Then known as Bath Island) bridge was guided downstream to reach Avery. He was able to climb onto the boat, but it immediately capsized throwing Avery back into the water before he went over the falls. A daguerreotype of Avery holding onto the tree was made by Platt D. Babbitt. William Dean Howells eulogized Avery's death in a poem, which concluded with the lines "Caught in the long-baffled clutch of the rapids, and rolled and hurled; headlong on to the cataract's brink, and out of the world". At times following Avery's death, the rock from which he clung became known as "Avery's Rock".
19 July 1853	Unnamed man	Fatality	American Falls	accident	
19 July 1853	Unnamed man	Fatality	American Falls	accident	
1 September 1889	Carlisle Graham	Survival	Horseshoe Falls	stunt	A week previous to his attempt over the falls, Graham had used a barrel to successfully take him through the Niagara Whirlpool. At 6:45 a.m on 1 September 1889, Graham's barrel was released into the river near Chippewa Creek before going over the falls at 7:10 a.m. Upon his rescue, Graham complained of back and head pain and his speech was described as incoherent.
24 October 1901	Annie Edson Taylor	Survival	Horseshoe Falls	stunt	Having successfully sent a cat over the falls in a barrel two days previously, Taylor survived going over the falls in an oak barrel as a stunt designed to help her financially. She exited the barrel bleeding but was not seriously injured.
2 July 1903	Ed Delahanty	Fatality	Horseshoe Falls	accident	Delahanty, a baseball player who was later elected to the National Baseball Hall of Fame, was swept over the falls having fallen from the International Railway Bridge; he had been kicked off a night train for drunk and disorderly conduct and threatening passengers. Delahanty's body was later recovered near the Maid of the Mist's berth; his body was mangled and one leg was severed.
25 July 1911	Bobby Leach	Survival	Horseshoe Falls	stunt	Leach, who had performed with Barnum & Bailey Circus, went over the falls in a metal barrel and subsequently spent six months in the hospital recovering from two broken knee caps and a fractured jaw.
11 July 1920	Charles Stephens	Fatality	Horseshoe Falls	stunt	Stephens, from Bristol in the UK, went over the falls in a barrel. Both Bobby Leach (q.v) and William "Red" Hill, Sr. urged Stephens to test his barrel over the falls before attempting the stunt, but he refused. When the barrel was recovered at the foot of the falls, the ballast had broken through the bottom of the barrel, and had pulled Stephen's body out of the barrel, leaving just his right arm in the safety harness.
4 July 1928	Jean Lussier	Survival	Horseshoe Falls	stunt	Lussier survived going over the falls in a large ball with a spring steel frame and a rubber covering.
4 July 1930	George Stathakis	Fatality	Horseshoe Falls	stunt	Stathakis, a Greek immigrant working as a chef in Buffalo, New York, went over the falls in a barrel. Upon impact, the barrel was stuck behind a curtain of water and could not be recovered for 18 hours. Stathakis had an air supply of up to eight hours – although he had survived the initial fall, he died of suffocation. Stathakis took the plunge with his pet turtle, which was said to be around 150 years old. The turtle survived the ordeal.
5 August 1951	William "Red" Hill, Jr.	Fatality	Horseshoe Falls	stunt	Hill, the son of William "Red" Hill, Sr., went over the falls in a craft he named "The Thing". The vessel broke apart on impact and Hill was killed; his body was found the following day. Following Hill's death, Canadian and American authorities banned public stunts at the falls and began to issue fines for people making attempts over the falls.
9 July 1960	Roger Woodward	Survival	Horseshoe Falls	accident	Seven-year-old Roger Woodward was swept over the falls. Woodward and his sister Deanne were in a 12-foot (3.7 m) aluminium fishing boat helmed by their family friend, James Honeycutt. Honeycutt lost use of the boat's propeller some 1.8 kilometres (1.1 mi) from the falls. The boat subsequently capsized in the rapids. Deanne was pulled from the river just 20 feet (6.1 m) from the brink of the falls, but Roger and Honeycutt were taken over the falls. Roger, who was wearing a lifejacket and remained buoyant, was rescued by the Maid of the Mist at the bottom of the falls; Honeycutt died.
9 July 1960	James Honeycutt	Fatality	Horseshoe Falls	accident	
15 July 1961	Nathan Boya	Survival	Horseshoe Falls	stunt	Boya (born William Fitzgerald) went over the falls in a rubber ball nicknamed the "Plunge-O-Sphere". The ball hit rocks on impact and bounced, but Boya was uninjured. Boya had launched from the American shore which would normally have resulted in him going over the American Falls, however, a current took him closer to the Canadian shore.
29 August 1981	Hesham Sayegh	Fatality	Horseshoe Falls	homicide	Dunia Sayegh, a 27-year-old resident of Toronto, dropped her two-month-old son Hesham over the railing and into the river just up from the brink of Horseshoe Falls, whereupon he was quickly swept over the falls. The boy's body was never found. Sayegh was arrested and charged with second-degree murder; the charges were subsequently dismissed.
3 July 1984	Karel Soucek	Survival	Horseshoe Falls	stunt	Soucek went over the falls in a barrel; he emerged with only minor injuries to his face that had been caused by his wristwatch on impact with the water. Soucek's descent was reported to be 75 miles per hour (121 km/h), and it took 45 minutes for the barrel to be recovered.
30 May 1985	Robert Ahrens	Fatality	American Falls	suicide	A man, believed to have been 56-year-old Robert Ahrens, committed suicide by jumping into the rapids at Prospect Point. Ahrens's fatal jump was coincidentally recorded by WGRZ, as cameraman Larry Frasier and anchor Phil Kavits were interrupted during a news piece on Niagara Falls upon seeing Ahrens.
18 August 1985	Steve Trotter	Survival	Horseshoe Falls	stunt	Trotter went over the falls in a barrel. It was his second attempt—his first, in November 1984, had been foiled by the police.
5 October 1985	David Munday	Survival	Horseshoe Falls	stunt	Munday successfully went over the falls in a barrel, having already had an attempt foiled when the International Control Dam reduced the river depth and grounded Munday's barrel. Munday made two further attempts to go over the falls, with one in 1990 failing when the barrel lodged at the top of the falls.
November 1986	Robert Billings	Fatality	American Falls	suicide	Canadian poet Robert Billings committed suicide following the breakdown of his marriage, and after the falls froze over for the winter, his body wouldn't be recovered until June 1987. Three years prior in 1983, Billings authored the poem "Epiphanies on the First Cold Day", which detailed his future method of suicide.
28 September 1989	Peter De Bernardi	Survival	Horseshoe Falls	stunt	De Bernardi and Petkovich went over the falls in a reinforced barrel; their stunt was to draw attention to an anti-drugs campaign. Approximately one year later, De Bernardi and Petkovich had another attempt foiled by authorities.
28 September 1989	Jeffery James Petkovich	Survival	Horseshoe Falls	stunt	De Bernardi and Petkovich went over the falls in a reinforced barrel; their stunt was to draw attention to an anti-drugs campaign. Approximately one year later, De Bernardi and Petkovich had another attempt foiled by authorities.
5 June 1990	Jessie Sharp	Fatality	Horseshoe Falls	stunt	Sharp went over the falls in a plastic kayak. He had intended to continue paddling on the river after the fall, and had a dinner reservation at a restaurant in Lewiston, 4 miles (6.4 km) downstream. After beginning the plunge he quickly disappeared into the falls and although his kayak was later found, his body was never recovered. Sharp decided not to wear a life jacket in case it impeded an escape should he get trapped under the falls, and refused to wear a helmet in order to keep his face recognizable to cameras.
26 September 1993	David Munday	Survival	Horseshoe Falls	stunt	Munday's second successful attempt at going over the falls (his first was on 5 October 1985).
18 June 1995	Steve Trotter	Survival	Horseshoe Falls	stunt	Trotter's second successful attempt at going over the falls (his first was on 18 August 1985) and Martin's first.
18 June 1995	Lori Martin	Survival	Horseshoe Falls	stunt	Trotter's second successful attempt at going over the falls (his first was on 18 August 1985) and Martin's first.
1 October 1995	Robert Overacker	Fatality	Horseshoe Falls	stunt	Overacker went over the falls on a jet ski to raise awareness for the homeless. His rocket-propelled parachute failed to open and he fell to his death. Overacker's body was recovered the next day and he was pronounced dead at Niagara General Hospital.
22 October 2003	Kirk Jones	Survival	Horseshoe Falls	stunt or suicide attempt	Jones went over the falls and became the first person to survive the drop without any aid in the fall, having swum from approximately 100 yards (91 m) before swimming over the falls. Jones and his friends had been drinking before the incident, and had planned to record the event—although his friends were not able to operate the recorder. Jones was fined $2,300 CAD and banned for life from entering Canada. He has said that his going over the falls was a suicide attempt rather than a stunt. Jones made a fatal attempt at going over the falls on 19 April 2017.
10 March 2009	Unnamed man	Survival	Horseshoe Falls	suicide attempt	An unnamed 30-year-old Canadian man survived a suicide attempt over the falls. In the attempt, his clothes were ripped from his body and he suffered a head laceration as well as cold shock, later developing hypothermia.
14 August 2011	Ayano Tokumasu	Fatality	Horseshoe Falls	accident	Tokumasu, a 19-year-old Japanese exchange student, was swept over the falls. Niagara Parks Police surveillance cameras show her climbing onto the railing near the water's edge and sitting on a pillar block. At about 8:30 p.m. she stood up, lost her footing, and fell over the edge into the Niagara River, approximately 20 metres (66 ft) upstream from the falls. Her body was recovered on 18 August.
21 May 2012	Unnamed man	Survival	Horseshoe Falls	accident	An unnamed man in his early 40s became the fourth person to survive an unprotected trip over Horseshoe Falls. Eyewitness reports indicate that he "deliberately jumped" into the Niagara River after climbing over a railing. He was reported to have suffered life-changing injuries, later specified as broken ribs, a collapsed lung and lacerations.
19 April 2017	Kirk Jones	Fatality	American Falls	stunt	Jones, who went over the falls unprotected on 22 October 2003, made an attempt within an inflatable ball. The ball had been seen spinning in the rapids above the American Falls on 19 April and later went over the falls. Jones died in the attempt; the empty ball was picked up by the Maid of the Mist, and Jones's body was recovered near Lake Ontario on 2 June.
8 July 2019	Unnamed man	Survival	Horseshoe Falls	suicide	At roughly 4 a.m., officers responded to a report of a person in crisis at the brink of the Canadian side of the falls. Once officers got to the scene, the man climbed the retaining wall, jumped into the river and went over the Horseshoe Falls. Authorities subsequently began to search the lower Niagara River basin, where the man was found sitting on the rocks at the water's edge.
28 October 2024	Chianti Means	Fatality	American Falls	suicide/homicide	Police responded to the area of Goat Island around 9 p.m. where they determined that 33-year-old Chianti Means and her two children, a 9-year-old and a 5-month-old, climbed over the safety guard rail on Luna Island and intentionally went over the Falls. Their bodies have not been recovered.
28 October 2024	Roman Rossman	Fatality	American Falls	suicide/homicide	Police responded to the area of Goat Island around 9 p.m. where they determined that 33-year-old Chianti Means and her two children, a 9-year-old and a 5-month-old, climbed over the safety guard rail on Luna Island and intentionally went over the Falls. Their bodies have not been recovered.
28 October 2024	Mecca Means	Fatality	American Falls	suicide/homicide	Police responded to the area of Goat Island around 9 p.m. where they determined that 33-year-old Chianti Means and her two children, a 9-year-old and a 5-month-old, climbed over the safety guard rail on Luna Island and intentionally went over the Falls. Their bodies have not been recovered.
