= Nathan Boya =

American who went over Niagara Falls (1924–2022)

Nathan Boya (July 28, 1924 – August 8, 2022; real name William Fitzgerald) was the first African American to go over Niagara Falls. Later in life, he authored two novels.

== Biography ==
Very little is known about Fitzgerald. He claimed to be self-employed, but others have claimed he worked for IBM.

On July 15, 1961, Fitzgerald went over the Horseshoe Falls in a metal ball he helped design called the "Plunge-O-Sphere". Performing stunts on the Falls could only be performed with permission, following the death of William Hill Jr. in 1951. Fitzgerald did not obtain a permit for his stunt and was arrested and fined after completing it.

Fitzgerald appeared (as Boya) as a contestant on I've Got a Secret on August 30, 1961. His secret was "I went over Niagara Falls in a 6-foot ball." Bill Cullen and Betsy Palmer questioned him. The other panelists, Henry Morgan and Bess Myerson, recognized him. He was later a contestant on To Tell The Truth on an episode that aired January 15, 1962. Three of the four members of the celebrity panel (Tom Poston, Dina Merrill and Johnny Carson) guessed him correctly; Betty White did not.

Following the flurry of appearances after his plunge, Fitzgerald did not make public appearances again until 1985, when he attended Karel Soucek's funeral, and in 1988, while protesting discriminatory actions against a scientist he called "Dr. X".

Interviewed in 2012 for a National Geographic television special about Niagara Falls daredevils, Fitzgerald revealed his reason for his stunt after decades of silence: he had broken off his engagement to a woman whom he felt he had wronged, and he performed the dangerous stunt as a form of penance. Niagara Falls had been their planned honeymoon destination.

Later in life, Fitzgerald moved to Bangkok, Thailand, and authored two novels. Fitzgerald was a 1943 graduate of Kingston High School in Kingston, New York. In 2018, aged 93, he endowed a yearly scholarship there in the names of his parents: Augustus and Sarah FitzGerald. Fitzgerald died on August 8, 2022, at the age of 98.

=== Published works ===
- FitzGerald, William (2015). Up Against the Wall You Spic Bastard: I'm Going to Blow Your Goddamn Head Off. [New York]: William FitzGerald. ISBN 978-1-5146-6515-2. OCLC 953833139.
- FitzGerald, William (2015). Wanted By Mafia: Hyawatha Two-Feathers: Either Dead Or Alive. [New York]: William FitzGerald. ISBN 978-1-5169-1183-7. OCLC 953833131.

== See also ==
- Jean Lussier, the first person to go over Niagara Falls in a rubber ball
