= Charles Stephens (daredevil) =

English daredevil, died at Niagara Falls

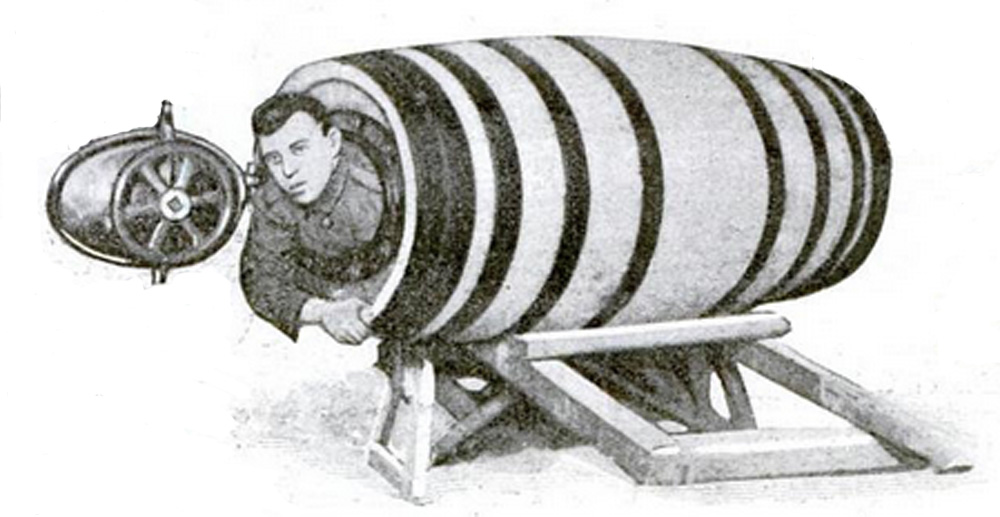
- Born: 1862; Bristol, England
- Died: 11 July 1920 (aged 57–58); Niagara Falls
- Resting place: Drummond Hill Cemetery
- Occupations: Barber; daredevil
- Known for: Being the first person to die attempting to go over Niagara Falls
- Spouse: Annie Stephens
- Children: 11

Charles Stephens or the Demon Barber of Bedminster (1862 – 11 July 1920) was an English barber and daredevil. Stephens was the first person to die attempting to go over Niagara Falls in a barrel. He is also the third person and second man to attempt this stunt. A barber living and working in Bristol, Stephens started performing stunts to support his family, which included his wife, Annie, and their 11 children. Charles moved to Ferndale in the Rhondda Valleys where he worked as a barber.

After calling the stunt a "cool commercial proposition", Stephens went over the Horseshoe Falls in an oak barrel, using an anvil for ballast; this proved to be fatal. Stephens ignored warnings from his advisers, fellow Niagara daredevils Bobby Leach and William "Red" Hill Sr., who suggested he test the barrel before going over the Falls. Stephens had not only strapped himself into the barrel but also strapped his feet to the anvil. As a result, Stephens was dragged under the Falls after the anvil broke the bottom of the barrel. Stephens' severed right arm, the only part recovered, is buried in the Drummond Hills Cemetery in Niagara Falls, Ontario.

== See also ==
- List of people who have gone over Niagara Falls
