= Kirk Jones =

Kirk Jones may refer to:

- Sticky Fingaz (Kirk Jones, born 1973), American rapper
- Kirk Jones (director) (born 1964), English film director and screenwriter
- Kirk Raymond Jones, first person to survive going over Niagara Falls without safety equipment
