= Jean Lussier =

Canadian-American daredevil

Joseph Albert "Jean" Lussier
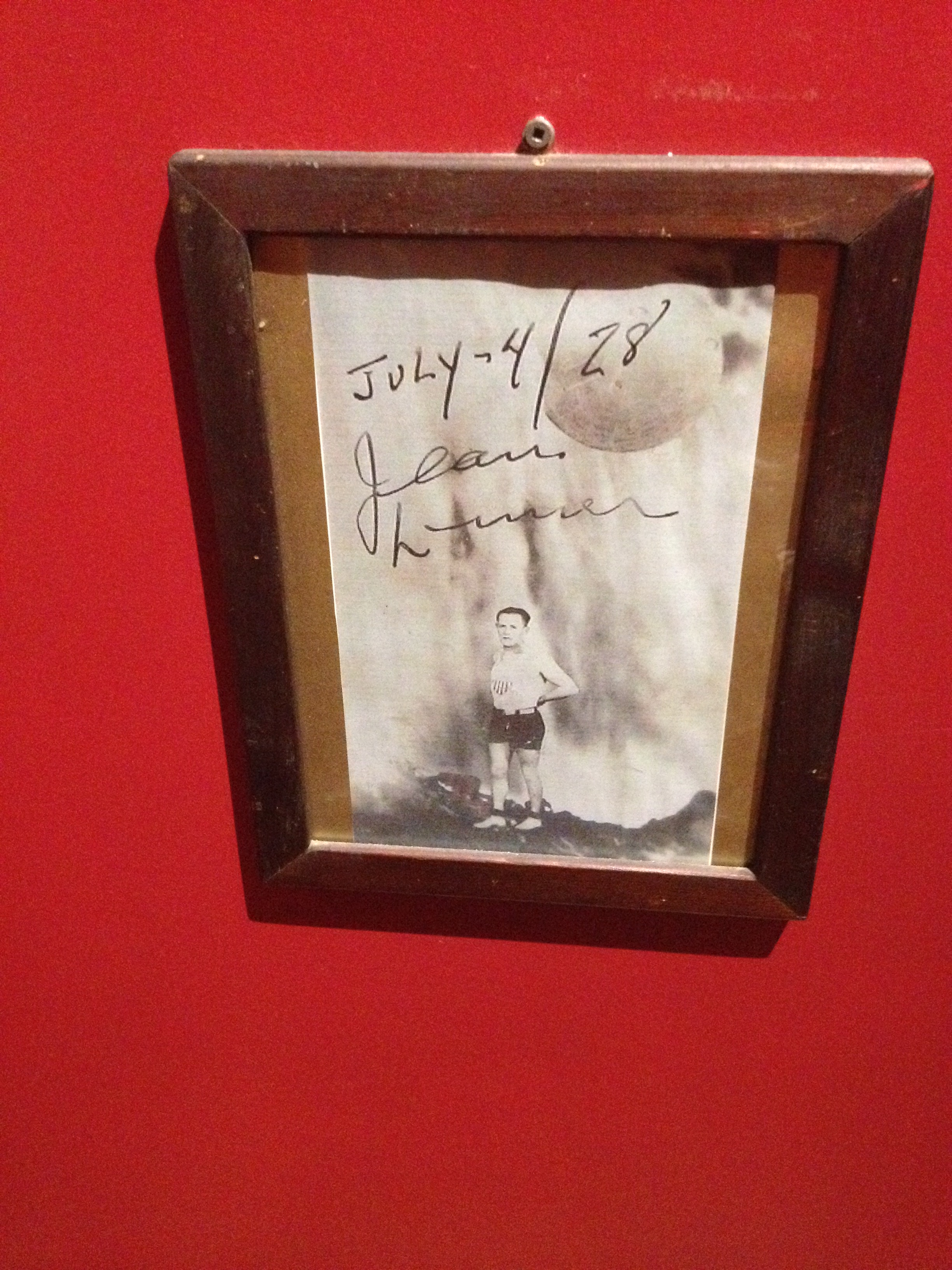
- Born: 1891; Concord, New Hampshire or Quebec, Canada
- Died: 1971 (aged 79–80); Niagara Falls, New York
- Occupations: machinist, daredevil
- Known for: 4th person to go over Niagara Falls, first to go over in rubber ball

Joseph Albert "Jean" Lussier (1891–1971) was a Canadian-American daredevil, best known for going over the Horseshoe Falls portion of Niagara Falls on July 4, 1928 in a rubber ball.

== Interest in Niagara ==
=== Early life ===
Not much is known about the early life of Joseph Albert Lussier, better known as Jean. He was born in 1891 in either Concord, New Hampshire or Quebec, Canada. At some point as a young adult, he moved to Springfield, Massachusetts, which would more definitively become known as his hometown. In 1920, daredevil Charles Stephens attempted to be the third person to go over the Horseshoe Falls at Niagara in a wooden barrel, following the successful attempts of Annie Edson Taylor and Bobby Leach. Stephens was dragged under the falls by the anvil he had strapped to his feet as ballast despite warnings by more experienced daredevils. This story piqued Lussier's interest in the Falls when he visited Niagara on vacation.

=== Building the vessel ===
Lussier moved to Akron, Ohio to have a rubber company develop what he envisioned as the perfect design for a stunt over Niagara Falls – a rubber ball. The vessel measured 182 centimeters (approx. 6 feet) in diameter, and featured steel bands to maintain the overall structure as it would be subjected to the power of the falls. The ball was lined with oxygen tanks, tubes, and valves to keep Lussier alive for up to forty hours in case he was trapped under or behind the falls as Stephens was. There were also hard rubber stabilizers to prevent excessive rolling and spinning. In total, it cost Lussier $7,000.

== Stunt ==
After eluding officials and rowing the ball about 3.2 kilometers (approx. 2 miles) above the drop of Horseshoe Falls, Lussier began his journey downstream on July 4, 1928, when he was 36 years old. Just before it reached the brink, the largest external stabilizer was ripped out by rocks on the river bottom. At 3:35 P.M., Lussier went over the falls, with the ball sustaining heavy damage to the inner tubing and frame. At 4:23 P.M., the ball was recovered, and Lussier emerged relatively unscathed, with only minor bruising from the impact. Joining Annie Edson Taylor and Bobby Leach in infamy, this attempt made Lussier the third successful daredevil to survive going over Niagara Falls, and the fourth overall attempt counting Stephens' death.

== Later life and plans ==
Capitalizing on his newfound fame and notoriety, Lussier permanently moved to Niagara Falls, New York, making a living by selling pieces of debris from the rubber ball to tourists. To maintain a flow of income once he ran out of material, Lussier would pass off pieces of rubber tires as genuine debris from the ball. In 1952, when Lussier was 61 years old, he dreamed of becoming the only person to go over both of the major Niagara Falls. He started making plans to make his second daredevil stunt and go over the American Falls in a more complex rubber ball featuring layers of cork and aluminum, and a series of braces to support the structure, as it would be twice as big as the one used at the Horseshoe Falls. Unfortunately, his dreams never materialized, and he retired in 1958 at the age of 67. Lussier died of natural causes in 1971 at the age of 80.
