= Karel Soucek =

Czech-born Canadian stuntman (1947–1985)

- Soucek in the barrel in which he went over Niagara Falls
- Born: Karel Souček; April 19, 1947; Czechoslovakia
- Died: January 20, 1985 (aged 37); Houston, Texas, U.S.
- Resting place: Niagara Falls, Ontario, Canada
- Occupation: Daredevil
- Known for: Going over Niagara Falls in a barrel

Karel Soucek (Note: Also appearing as Souček.) (April 19, 1947 – January 20, 1985) was a Czech professional daredevil living in Canada who went over Niagara Falls in a barrel in 1984. He died the following year due to injuries sustained during a stunt attempt at the Astrodome in Houston.

== Biography ==
Before emigrating to Canada, Soucek was a tank commander in his native Czechoslovakia. He established himself as a daredevil by performing stunt flying, wing walking, skydiving, and motorcycle stunts. He lived in Hamilton, Ontario.

Soucek prepared for his 1984 attempt to go over Niagara Falls (Note: Prior to Soucek's 1984 attempt, the most recent person known to have survived going over Niagara Falls was Nathan Boya in 1961.) by researching previous attempts, by sending unmanned barrels over the falls to test the currents, and by dropping his barrel off the Niagara Escarpment in Hamilton to test its shock absorbance. Soucek's custom-made barrel was 9 feet (2.7 m) long and 5 feet (1.5 m) in diameter. It was bright red and bore the words, "Last of the Niagara Daredevils - 1984" and "It's not whether you fail or triumph, it's that you keep your word... and at least try!"

On July 2, 1984, the barrel was rolled into the Niagara River 1,000 feet (300 m) above the cataract of Niagara Falls with Soucek inside. In seconds, the barrel was swept over the brink. Shortly after, Soucek emerged bleeding but safe.

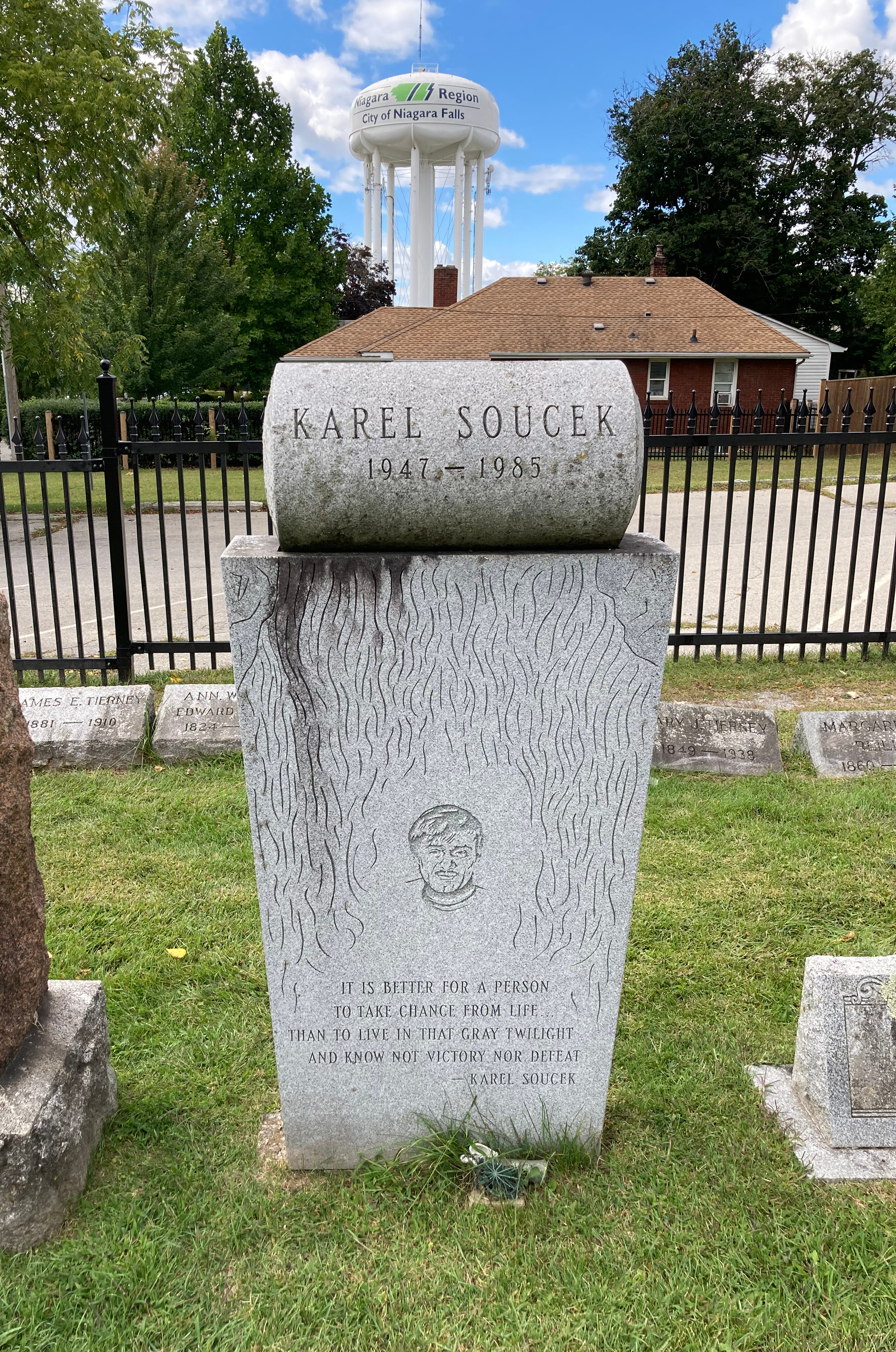
Soucek's grave at Drummond Hill Cemetery. The inscription reads: "It is better for a person to take chance from life than to live in that gray twilight and know not victory nor defeat. – Karel Soucek"

Soucek was fined $500 for performing the stunt without a license. He had also spent $15,000 on materials and labor and $30,000 to film the stunt, but quickly earned back all his costs from sales and interviews. Having tasted success, Soucek decided to build a museum at Niagara Falls, Ontario, in which to display his stunting paraphernalia. He convinced a corporation to finance a barrel drop from the top of the Houston Astrodome into a tank of water to pay for his project.

On January 19, 1985, as Soucek was enclosed in his barrel, 180 feet (55 m) above the floor of the Astrodome, the barrel was released prematurely and began spinning as it fell toward the ground. Instead of landing in the center of the tank of water, the barrel hit the rim. Foam pads, which had been placed at the bottom of the tank to cushion Soucek's fall, had floated to the surface before the barrel was released. Soucek, severely injured, was still alive when he was cut from the barrel but died while the Astrodome stunt show was still going on. Stuntman Evel Knievel had tried to persuade Soucek not to go through with the stunt, calling it "the most dangerous I've ever seen".

Soucek is buried at the Drummond Hill Cemetery in Niagara Falls, Ontario.

== See also ==
- List of inventors killed by their own invention
