= George Barker (photographer) =

Canadian-American photographer

George Barker (17 July 1844 – 27 November 1894) was a Canadian-American photographer best known for his photographs of Niagara Falls.

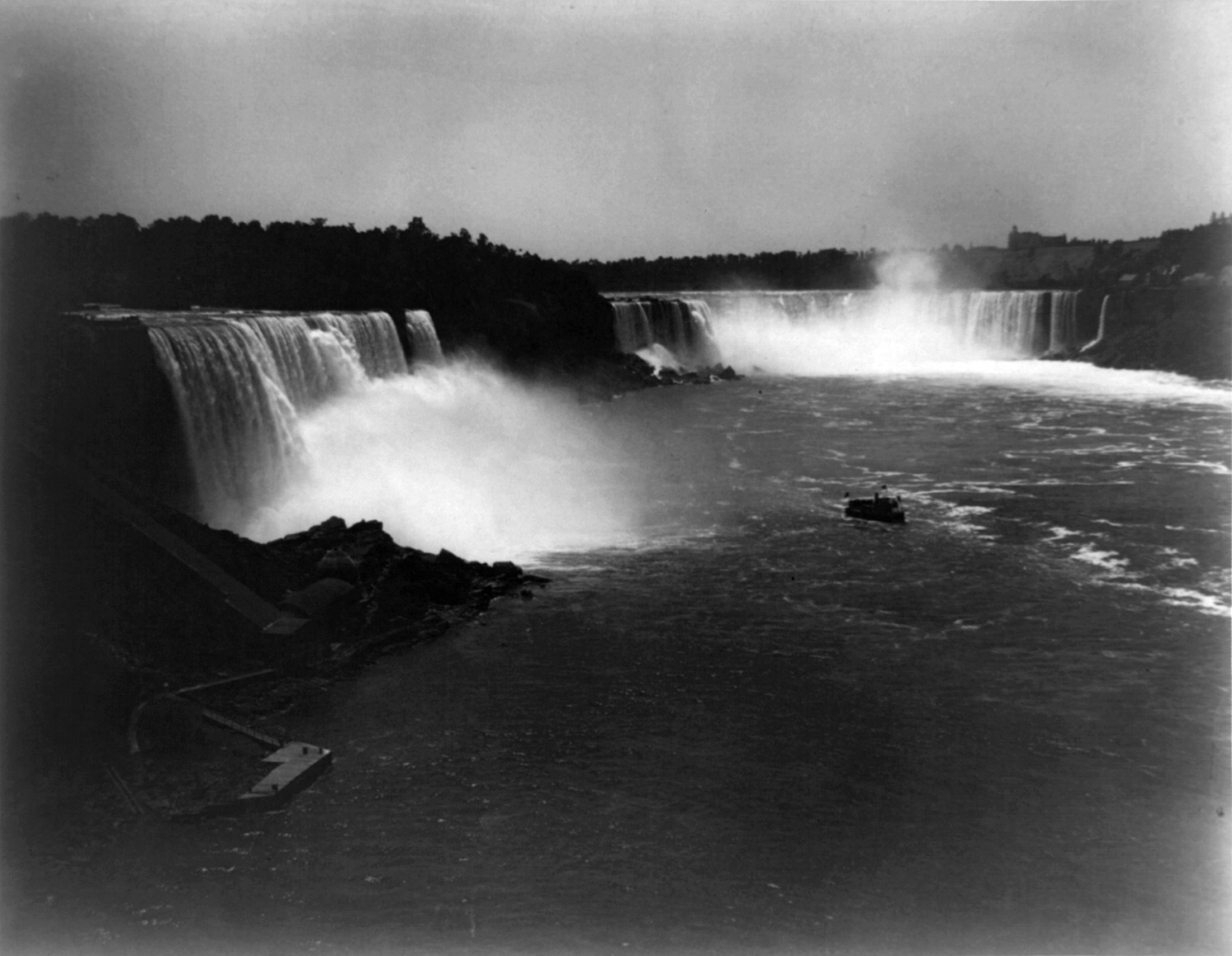
Niagara Falls, by George Barker

== Life ==
Barker was born in London, Canada West in 1844. He first studied landscape painting, switching to photography following a financial setback. He began his photography training with the Western-Canadian photographer James Egan. At the age of 18, he had opened his own studio in London.

== Photography career ==
=== Niagara Falls ===
In July 1862, he made his first trip to Niagara Falls, New York, where he found a job working for Platt D. Babbitt. By the late 1860s, he had studios in both London and Niagara Falls, with the Niagara studio called Barker's Stereoscopic View Manufactory and Photograph Rooms, and had become known nationwide for his large-format (up to 18 in × 20 in (46 cm × 51 cm)) and stereographic prints of the falls. In 1866, he won a gold medal for landscape photography at the convention for the Photographers Association of America, held in Saint Louis.

Barker's Niagara studio was destroyed by fire on February 7, 1870, but his negatives survived.

=== Florida ===
Barker was one of the earliest photographers to visit the state of Florida. At the time, photography in Florida was challenging, as much of the state remained undeveloped, which meant photographers needed to carry their bulky equipment through the state's wetlands and subtropical jungles, as well as deal with delicate film in hot and humid conditions. Barker spent nearly four years (on and off), from 1886 to 1890, documenting much of northern and central Florida.

=== Disasters ===
In addition to his well-known landscape photographs, Barker traveled the United States, documenting natural disasters such as the Louisville Tornado of 1890 and the 1889 Johnstown flood.

== Death ==
When he died in 1894 of Bright's disease, he was described as "the eminent photographer of Niagara Falls".

== Collections ==
Upon his death, his works were acquired by Underwood & Underwood of Washington, D.C.

Additional works are included in the permanent collections of:

- the Library of Congress,
- The J Paul Getty Museum, and
- the Metropolitan Museum of Art, New York,
- the National Galleries of Scotland,
- the Art Institute of Chicago,
- the Art Gallery of Ontario,
- the National Gallery of Art,
- the Museum of Fine Arts, Houston, and
- the Smithsonian American Art Museum.

== Gallery ==
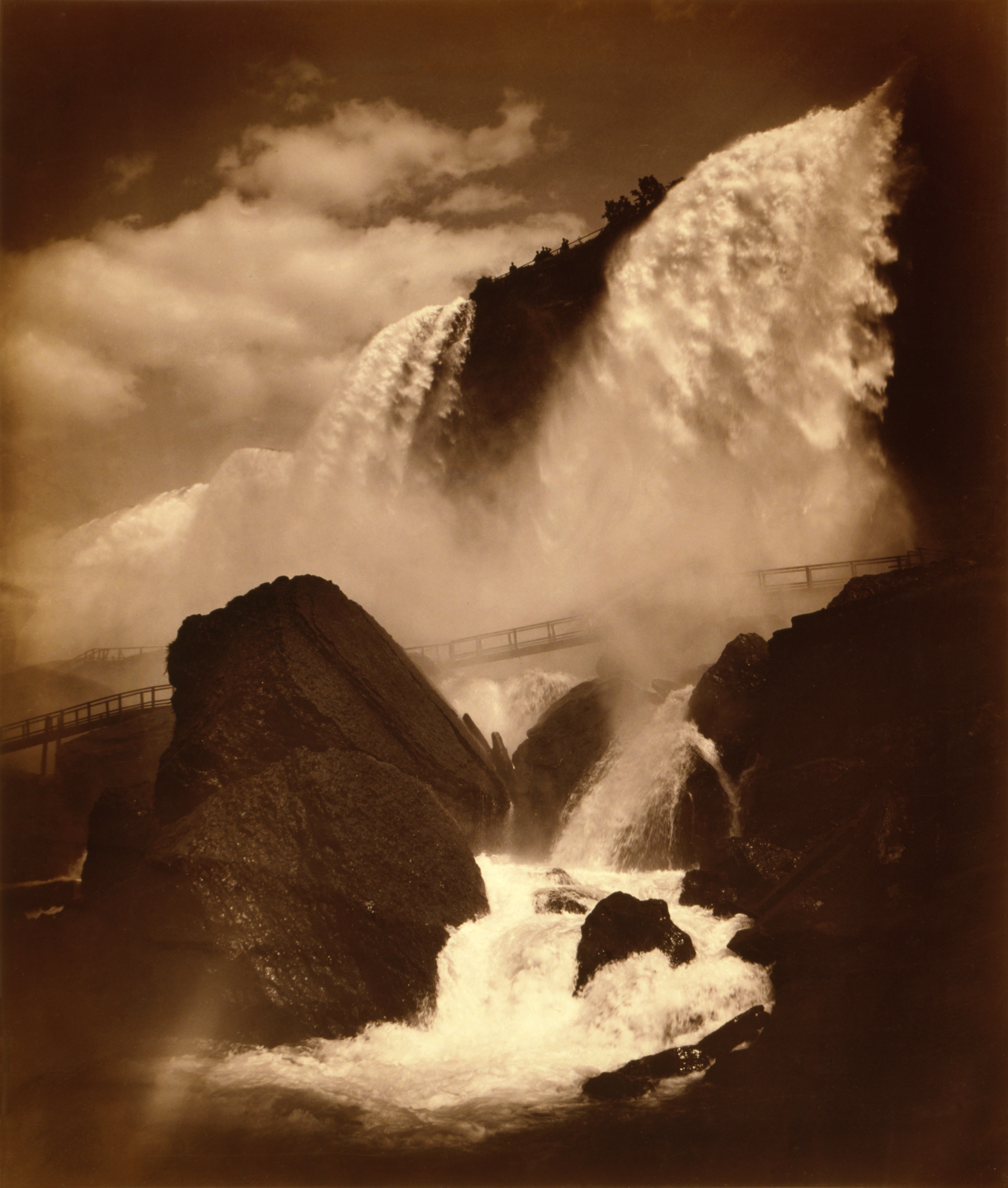
Cave of the Winds

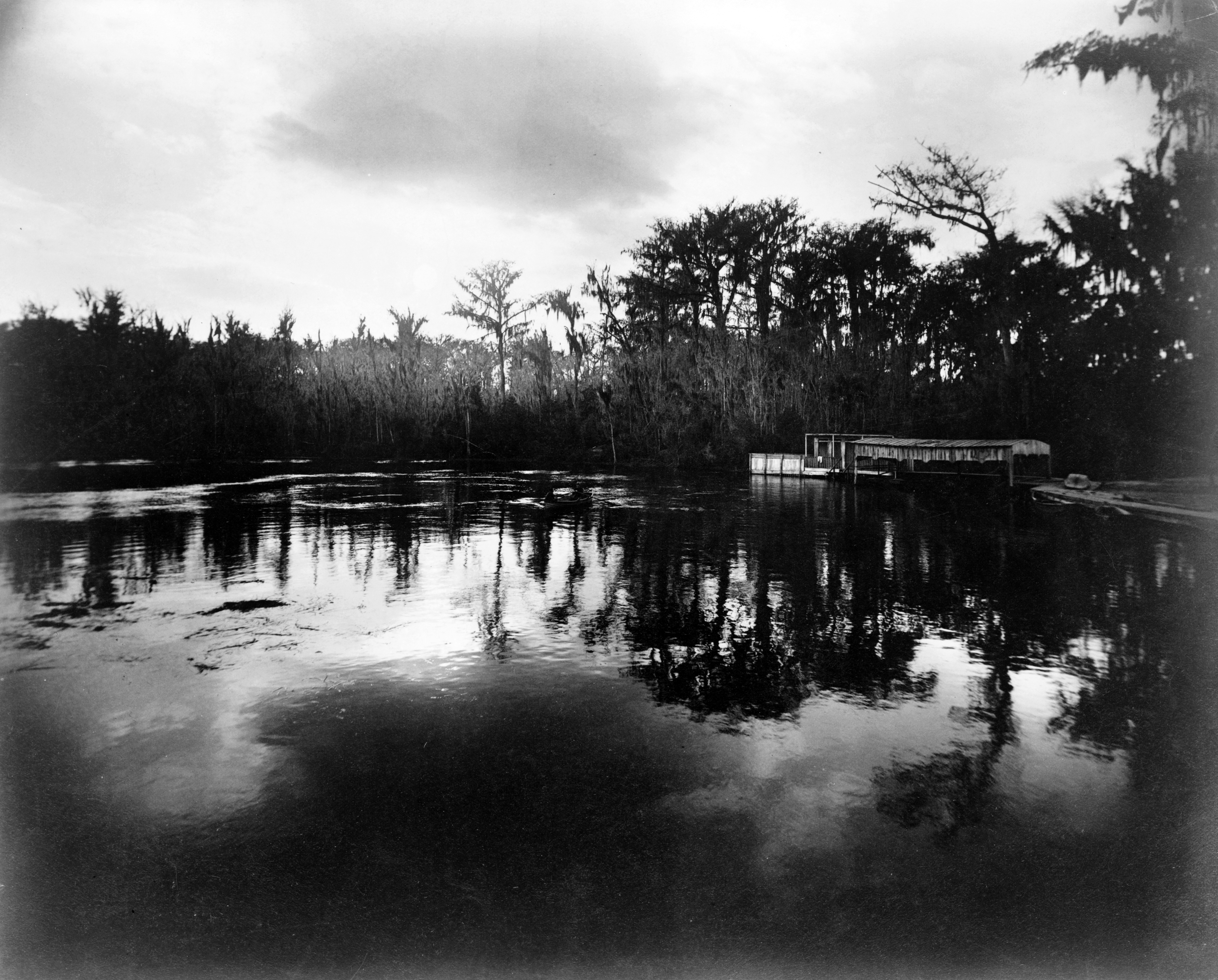
Silver Springs, Florida

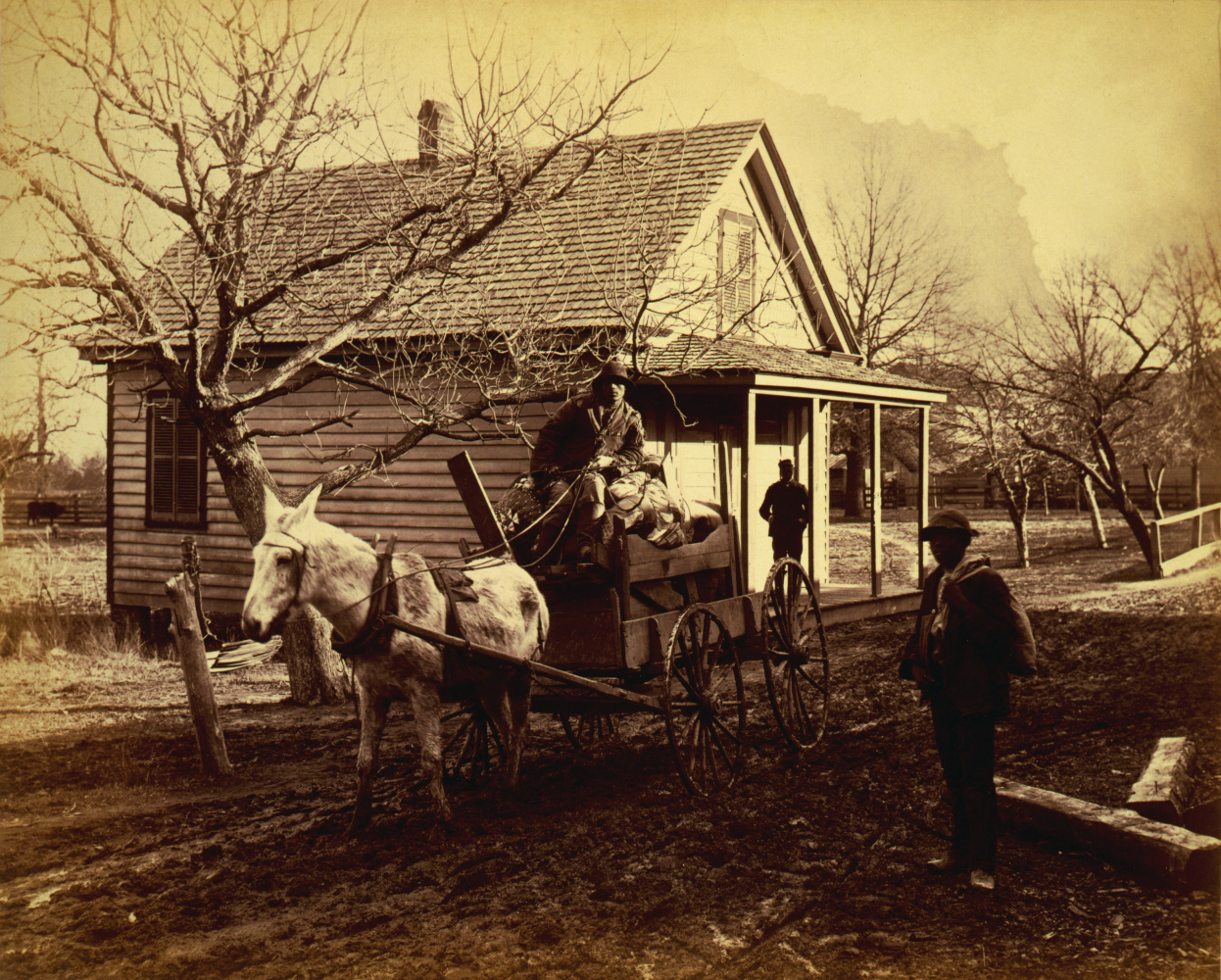
Mule-drawn wagon in Stony Creek, Virginia
