= Platt D. Babbitt =

American photographer

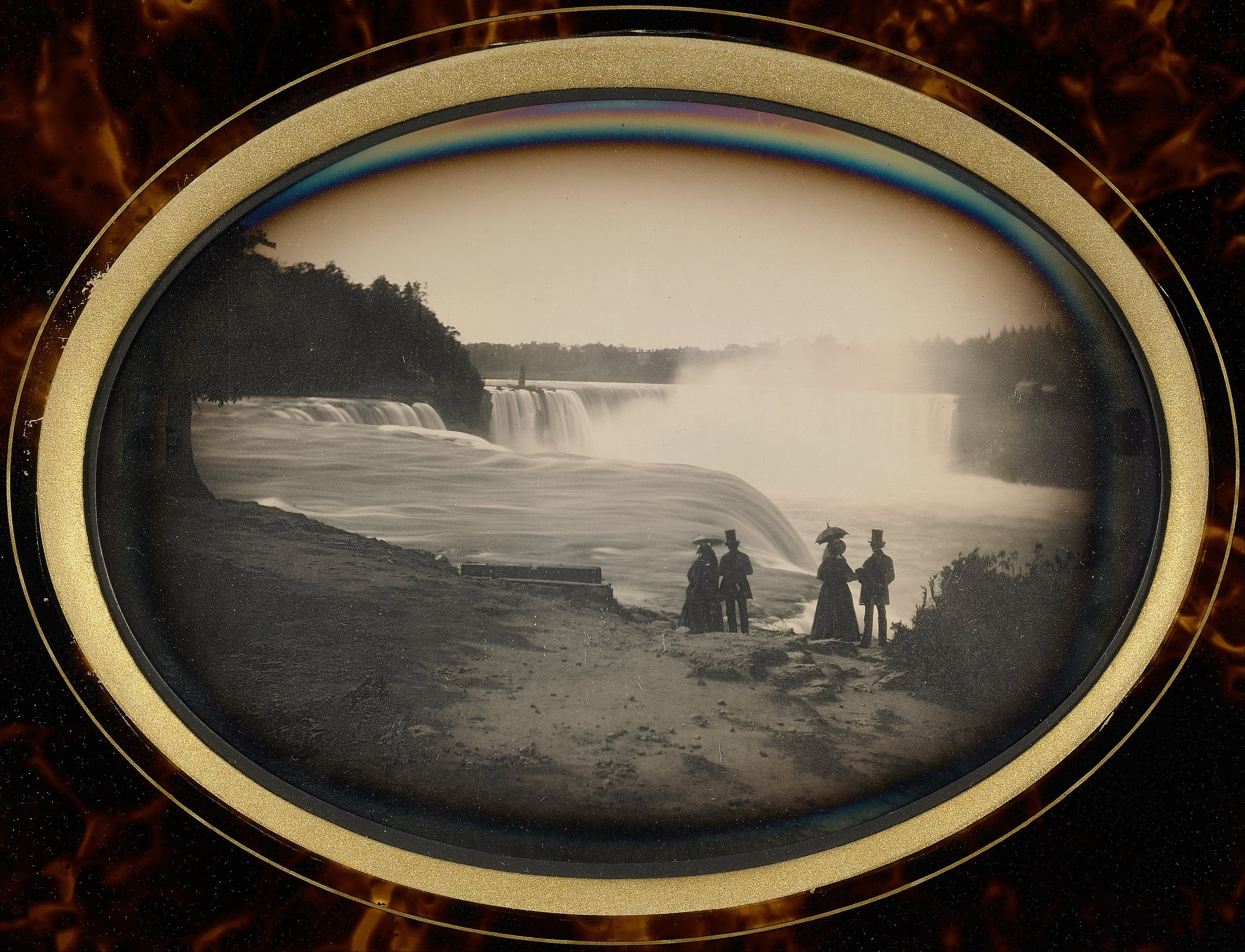
Scene at Niagara Falls, daguerreotype (circa 1855)

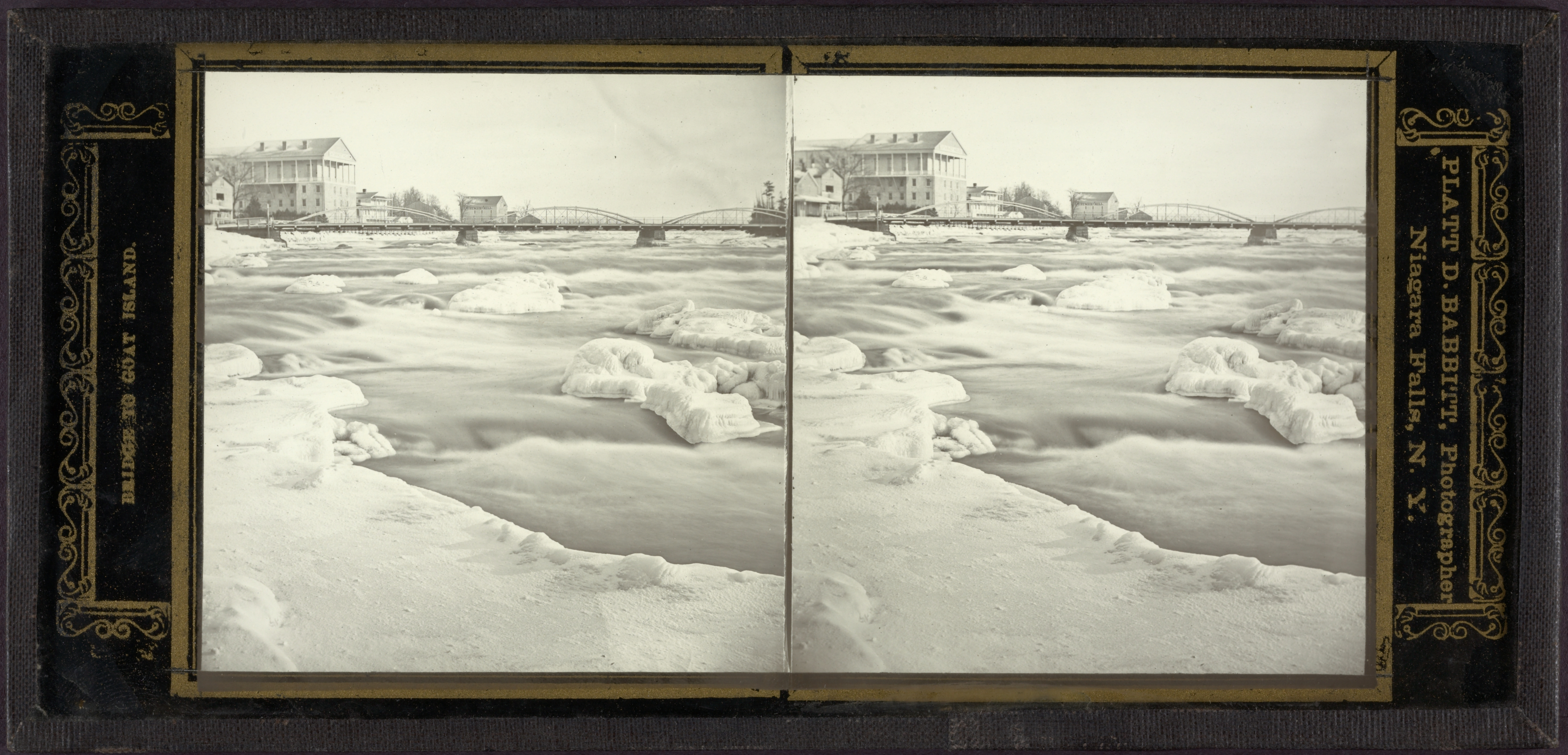
Bridge to Goat Island

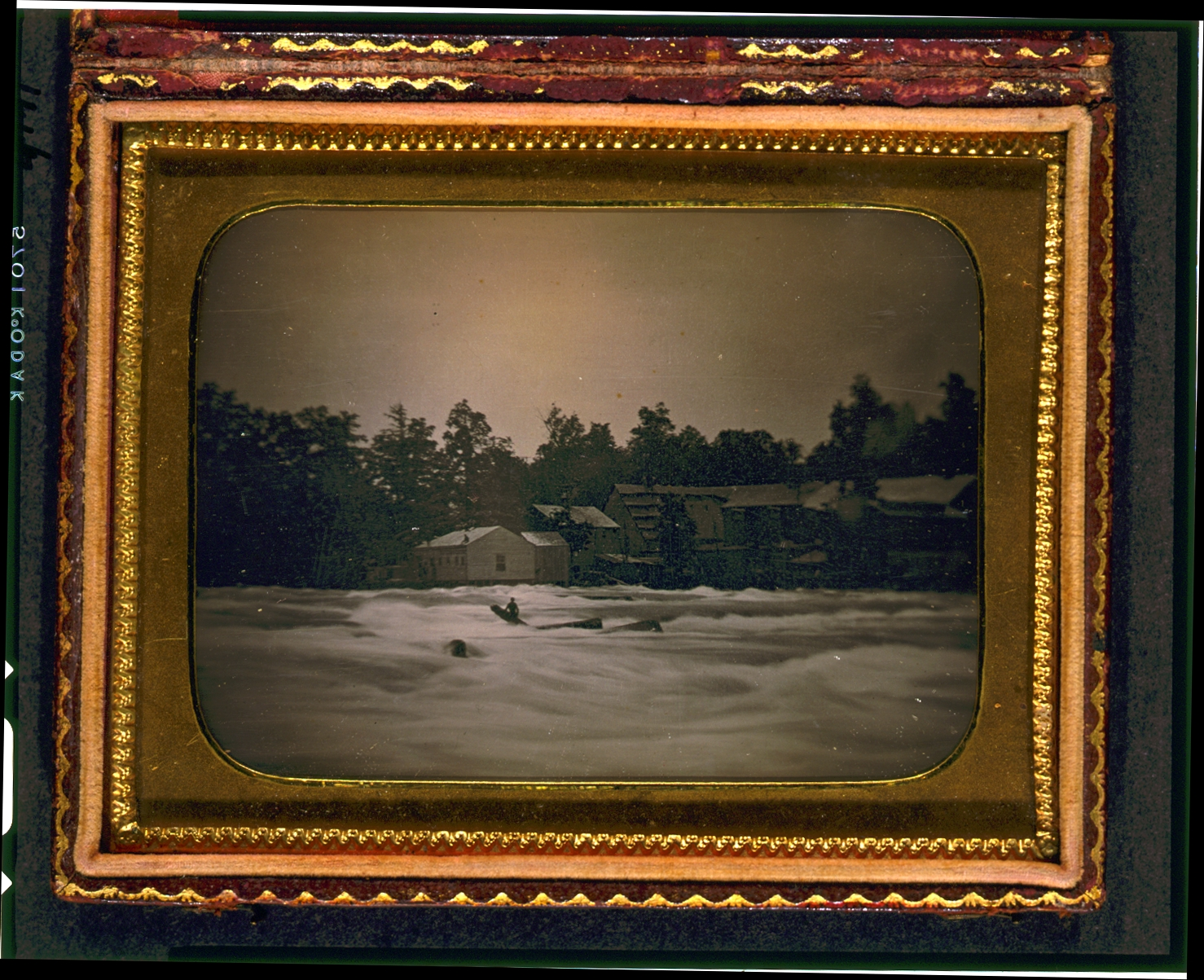
Man stranded on rocks in the Niagara River

Platt D. Babbitt (May 22, 1822 – August 21, 1879) was an American photographer best known for his photographs in the area of Niagara Falls. His photographs captured people standing near the edge overlooking the falls. He also photographed wintery scenery in the area.

== Life and work ==
Babbitt was born in Lanesborough, Massachusetts.

He opened a gallery on Ridout Street in London, Ontario in November 1850. He advertised as an itinerant in Niagara Falls. By 1853 he was established at Niagara Falls, NY, in a pavilion overlooking the falls from where he sold daguerreotypes and ambrotypes to visitors. His photographs captured people standing near the edge overlooking the falls. He also photographed wintery scenery in the area.

Babbitt photographed Joseph Avery on July 17, 1853 holding onto a log in the rapids above the falls. Avery was one of three men who lost their boat in the current. As the boat capsized, two of the men went over the falls and died, but Avery was able to hold onto a log pinned amongst rocks for 18 hours before succumbing after a series of failed rescue attempts.

Babbitt continued in business until his death in 1879. His work includes glass stereo view images. Newspaper accounts report that he also made diapositive "window hanger" images. At least one of his stereo negatives is credited on an Anthony paper stereo view. He corresponded with Southworth & Hawes and purchased one or two of their parlor stereoscopes. Photographer George Barker worked for Babbitt in Niagara Falls, New York.

The Niagara Falls Gazette reported that Babbitt committed suicide on the morning of August 21, 1879 by drowning himself at South Wales, New York in Erie County, New York. He had been suffering from fainting spells and weakness. His wife found his hat atop driftwood in Cazenovia Creek and then his body in the creek. Babbitt had emptied his pockets of papers and money before his death, and had fastened a short rope around his neck and the other end around a flat stone. He was buried in Cincinnati. he was found dead while in creek with his daughter

== Gallery ==
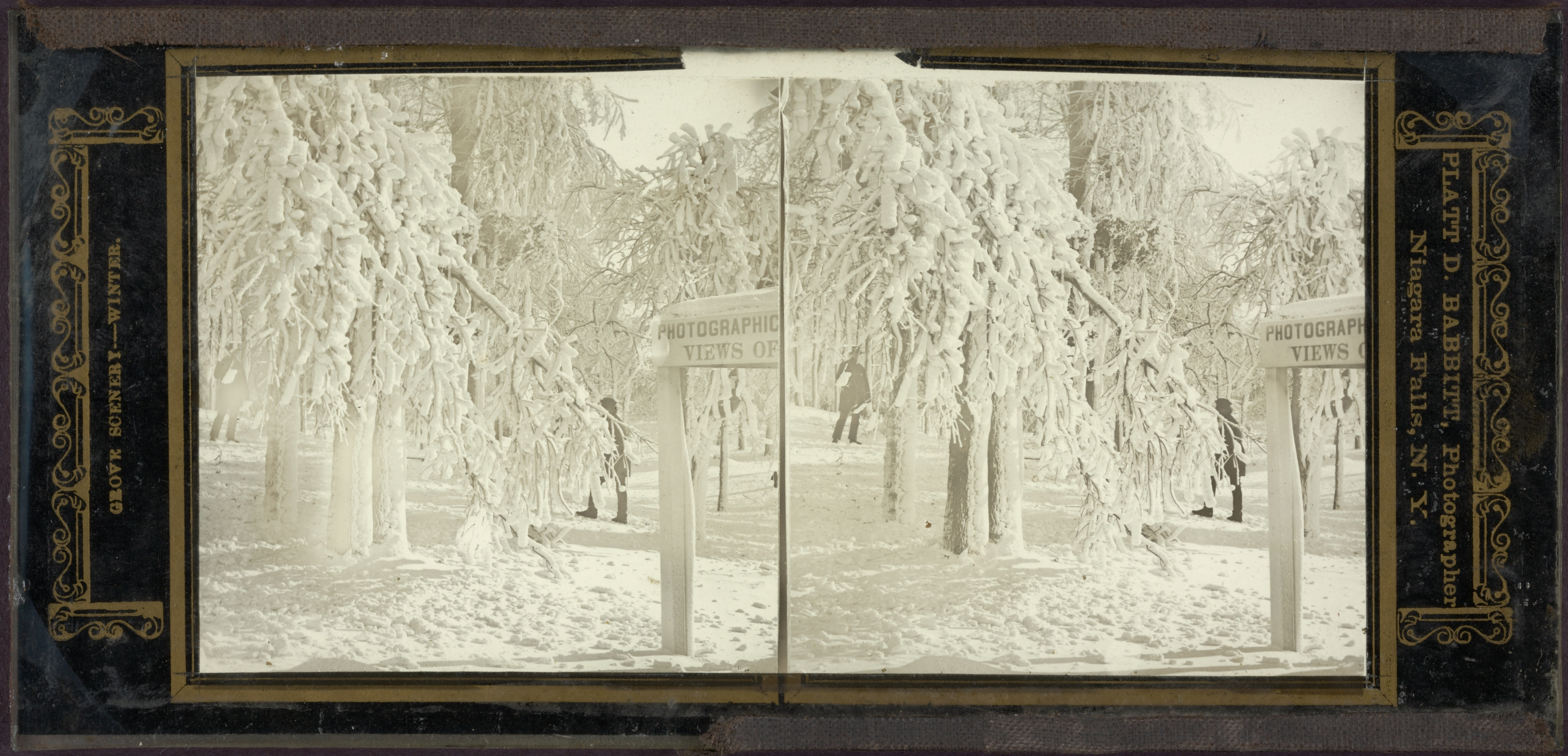
Grove scenery, winter

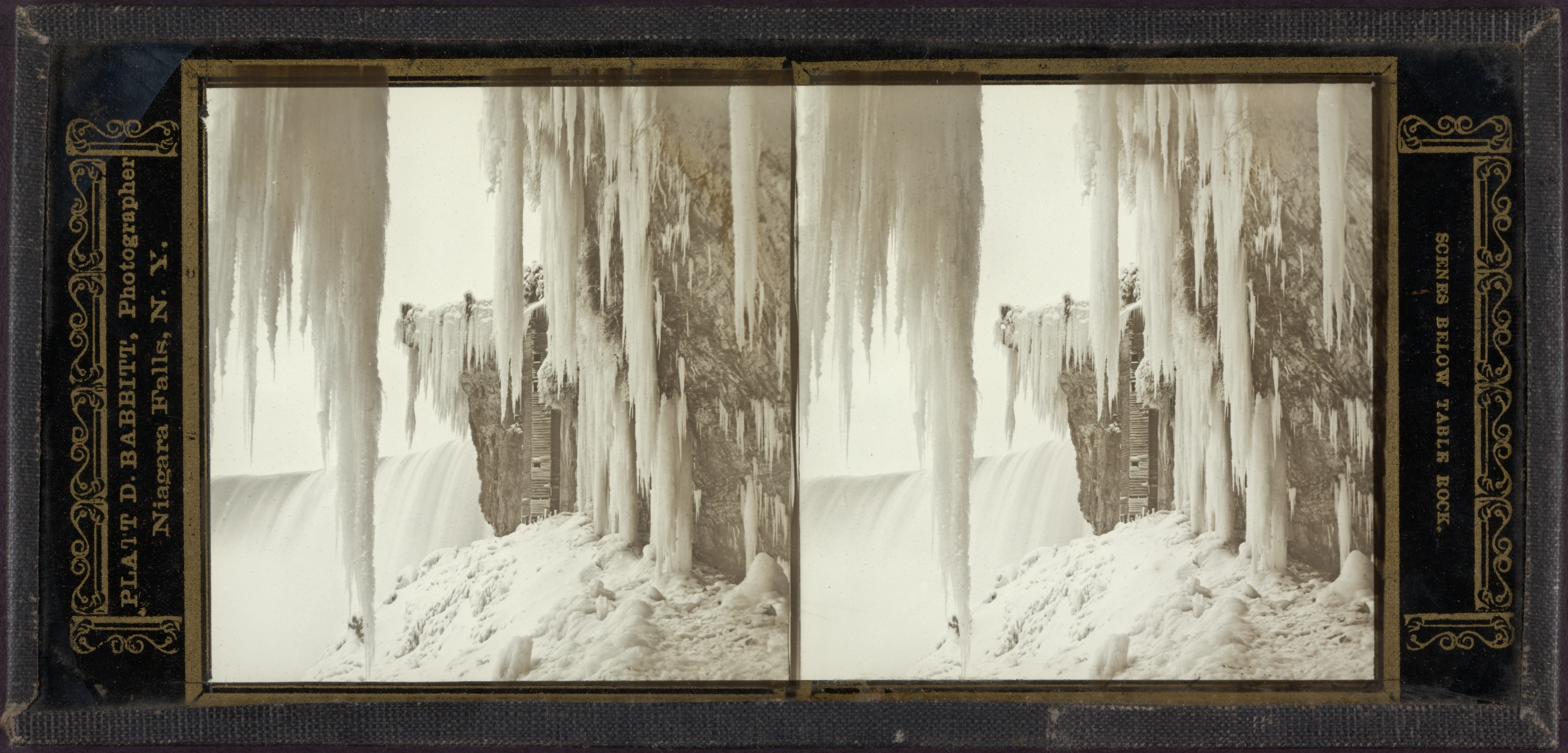
Scenes below Table Rock
