= Steve Trotter =

American stunt performer (1960–2022)

- Trotter at Niagara Falls in 1985
- Born: Steven Trotter; November 13, 1960; Providence, Rhode Island, United States
- Died: October 14, 2022 (aged 61); Freeport, Florida, U.S.
- Occupations: Bartender; daredevil
- Known for: Going over Niagara Falls in a barrel twice

Steven Trotter (November 13, 1960 – October 14, 2022) was an American daredevil who at age 24 became the youngest person to have gone over Niagara Falls in a barrel. He was one of a few people to perform the stunt twice. He also performed other illegal stunts. He died unexpectedly in 2022.

== 1985 – Successful journey over Niagara Falls ==
Despite having been stopped by Niagara Parks police two days earlier, on August 18, 1985, at 8:30 AM, Trotter's 11-man crew launched his barrel into the Niagara River rapids, a quarter-mile from the brink of the Canadian Horseshoe Falls. Trotter went over the Falls and survived with minor scrapes. Trotter said the stunt was "like the best roller-coaster ride you had as a 10-year-old." He was fined $500 by the Niagara Parks Police for "illegally stunting in a park."

Trotter had planned the stunt for years, and innovated a construction design using two pickle barrels placed end-to-end. The exterior was reinforced with layers of fiberglass, balsa wood for flotation, and covered with truck tire inner tubes for shock absorption. Trotter was strapped into an automotive racing harness and equipped with flashlights, a life jacket, a two-way radio, and oxygen tanks. The ends of the barrel were sealed with submarine-style twist caps.

Trotter appeared on Good Morning America and The Tonight Show Starring Johnny Carson. Trotter's photo was published in Time magazine, he made the front page of USA Today, and numerous other publications worldwide. He was selected by Mademoiselle as "One of the 10 Sexiest Men in the World."

== 1995 – Second successful journey over Niagara Falls ==
He performed the stunt again on June 18, 1995, becoming the second person to survive the stunt twice. He was accompanied by Lori Martin. The barrel, which had a 90-minute air supply for its two occupants, was made from two heater tanks welded together.

Trotter received a compression fracture in his back as a result of the stunt. He also received a jail sentence of two weeks and was fined $14,700 by the Niagara Parks Commission.

== Other stunts ==
Trotter also achieved notoriety in November 1985, when he set the world record for the longest "Tarzan swing" off the Golden Gate Bridge in San Francisco. Trotter attached a 176-foot (54 m) cable to the center span of the bridge, then moved to a point 176 feet (54 m) away, and jumped off the bridge. Trotter, sitting on a small wooden disk attached to the end of the cable, in effect became the weight on a pendulum, traveling at 70 mph (112 km/h). Trotter was jailed and charged with trespassing.

Trotter's attempted repeat of the stunt in 1997 at the Sunshine Skyway Bridge ended in disaster. Trotter and four other people jumped, attached to the same cable. The plan had not been tested previously, and the cable snapped during the effort, causing Trotter and the others to plunge at least 70 feet (21 m) into the bay. Trotter, Kenny Bunker and Jeff Sargent escaped major injury, but Lori Martin broke a vertebra in her neck and stopped breathing after the accident, forcing the others to administer cardiopulmonary resuscitation to keep her alive in the water. Glenn Rohm also broke a vertebra and had his head held in a metal halo drilled into his skull.

== Personal life ==
Trotter was born in Providence, Rhode Island, and raised in Barrington, RI. Throughout his adult life he worked primarily as a bartender in Sandestin, Florida. Notably ACME Oyster House.
