= Kirk Raymond Jones =

First person to survive going over Niagara Falls without safety equipment

- Jones in 2004
- Born: 1962 or 1963
- Died: c. April 19, 2017 (aged 53 or 54) (Note: Some sources claim Jones was 53 years old when he died, while others claim he was 54.); Niagara Falls
- Cause of death: Going over Niagara Falls
- Body discovered: Youngstown, New York, US
- Known for: Going over Niagara Falls without safety equipment

Kirk Raymond Jones (1962 or 1963 – c. April 19, 2017) was an American who became the first person to survive going over Horseshoe Falls, the largest waterfall of Niagara Falls, without safety equipment, in 2003. He then went over Niagara Falls again in 2017 with a plastic ball and died.

== Early life ==
Jones was born to Doris and Raymond Jones in 1962 and lived in Canton, Michigan.

== 2003 fall ==
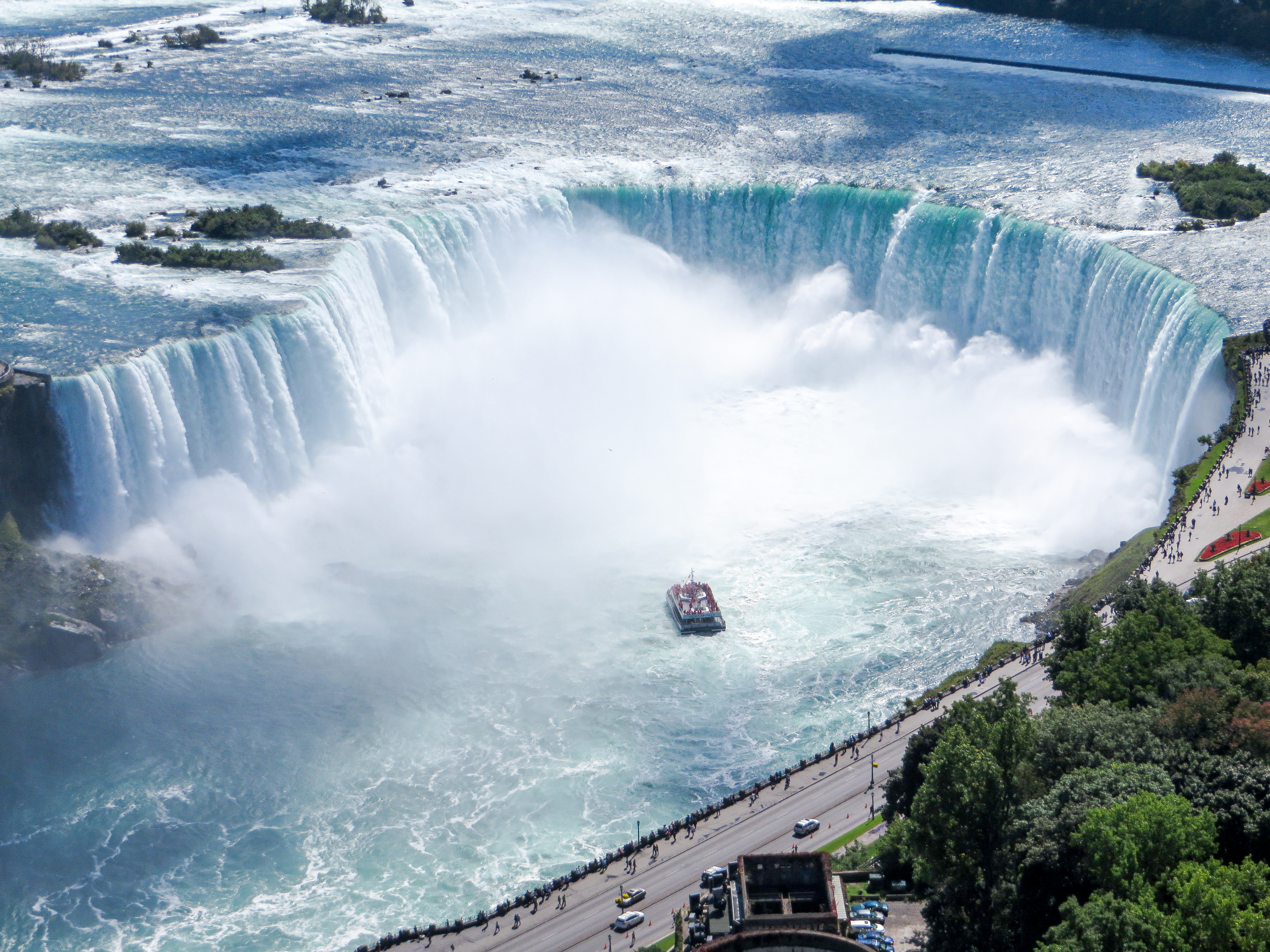
Horseshoe Falls viewed from the Canadian side of the Niagara River in 2014.

According to his family and friends, Jones, who was then 40 years old, had been interested in going over Niagara Falls for many years and believed that there was a place that one could jump from and survive. One friend claimed that Jones hoped to make money from the stunt. Jones claimed he was driven by depression, but later revealed that he claimed depression to avoid being fined.

Eight weeks before going over Niagara Falls, Jones, who had been fired from his father Raymond's car gauge manufacturing plant, went on a trip to the Canadian side of Niagara Falls with his parents, who planned to retire in Oregon after the trip. Jones and friend Bob Krueger subsequently drove to Niagara Falls with $300 that Jones's parents wired him. On October 18, 2003, Jones arrived in the town of Niagara Falls, planning to go over the falls the next morning.

The next day, Jones drove along Horseshoe Falls, which carries 90% of the flow of Niagara Falls, scouting; however, he did not go down the falls.

Jones woke up at 6 am on October 20, 2003, and left $30, all that was left from the $300 his parents sent, and a note addressed to his family in Krueger's car. He later said he felt like "the loneliest man in the world".

Around 8 am, Jones went over a handrail, entering the Niagara River and floating on his back. He then went over Horseshoe Falls headfirst, landing feet-first in the collection pool, then being sent 40 to 50 feet (12 to 15 m) under the surface. He resurfaced and floated down the river before pulling himself out of the water onto rocks. He was smiling during the fall. Historian Paul Gromosiak theorized that Jones survived due to a water cone caused by a buildup of air pressure cushioning his fall.

It was an impulsive one-second thing and in a second and a half I was in the water [...] I was in the water for about eight seconds. [...] I was immediately enveloped by what seemed like tons of water.

— Jones, interview with WXYZ-TV

The event was condemned by chairman of the Niagara Parks Commission Brian Merrett as "stupid", claiming that "it puts all of our people—the fire department, the paramedics, everyone—at risk to do the rescues."

After being recovered, Jones spent three days being treated at a psychiatric ward. He was charged with performing a banned stunt and criminal mischief. He pled guilty and was fined CA$5,000 (US$4,000) and agreed to never return to the Canadian side of Niagara Falls.

After paying his fine, he signed a $100,000 contract with a circus; however, the circus collapsed three months later. Jones moved to his family's Oregon home, and he went to the American part of Niagara Falls seeking opportunities to promote.

== 2017 fall and death ==
Around April 19, 2017, Jones, who was then 53 or 54 years old, alongside his seven-foot-long (2 m) pet boa constrictor Misty, attempted to go over Niagara Falls in a ten-foot (3.0 m) inflatable ball. His empty ball was found by a Maid of the Mist boat on the same day, while his body was found by the United States Coast Guard 12 miles (19 km) downstream the Niagara River, at the mouth of Lake Ontario in the village of Youngstown, on June 2. The snake's fate is unknown.

== See also ==
- List of people who have gone over Niagara Falls
- Paul Aladdin Alarab, who survived a fall from the Golden Gate Bridge in 1988 and died on a second attempt in 2003
