= William "Red" Hill Sr. =

Canadian daredevil and rescuer

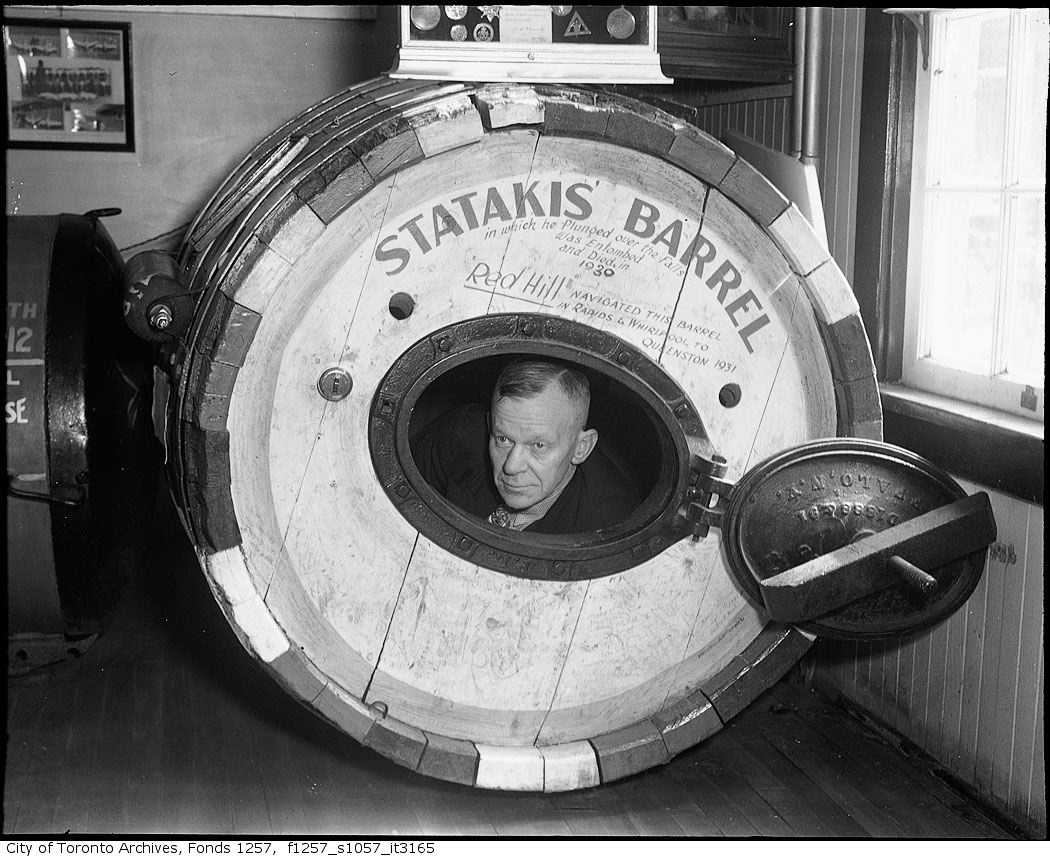
- "Red" in a barrel, about 1935
- Born: William Thomas Hill, Senior; November 17, 1888; Niagara Falls, Ontario, Canada
- Died: May 14, 1942 (aged 54); Niagara Falls, Ontario, Canada
- Occupations: Riverman, daredevil
- Years active: 1896–1918
- Spouse: Beatrice Clark
- Children: William Red Hill Jr., Major Lloyd Hill, Norman Corky Hill, Wesley Hill, Edith Hill, Helen Hill, Margaret Hill

William "Red" Hill Sr. (November 17, 1888 – May 14, 1942) was a Canadian daredevil and rescuer, born in Niagara Falls, Ontario, in 1888. In 1896 he received his first medal for bravery when he rescued his sister from their burning house which was followed by a life-saving medal in 1912, achieving the status as a local hero. A bootlegger on occasion during the Prohibition, Hill went on to receive a total of four medals in addition to being credited with saving 28 lives and the recovery of 177 accident and suicide victims from the Niagara River just below the Falls.

Hill's reputation grew as a renowned Canadian daredevil in 1930 with a five-hour journey in a 6-foot-long (1.8 m) steel barrel which began just below the falls at the Maid of the Mist boat landing and through the treacherous Niagara lower rapids ending up several miles down stream at Queenston, Ontario.

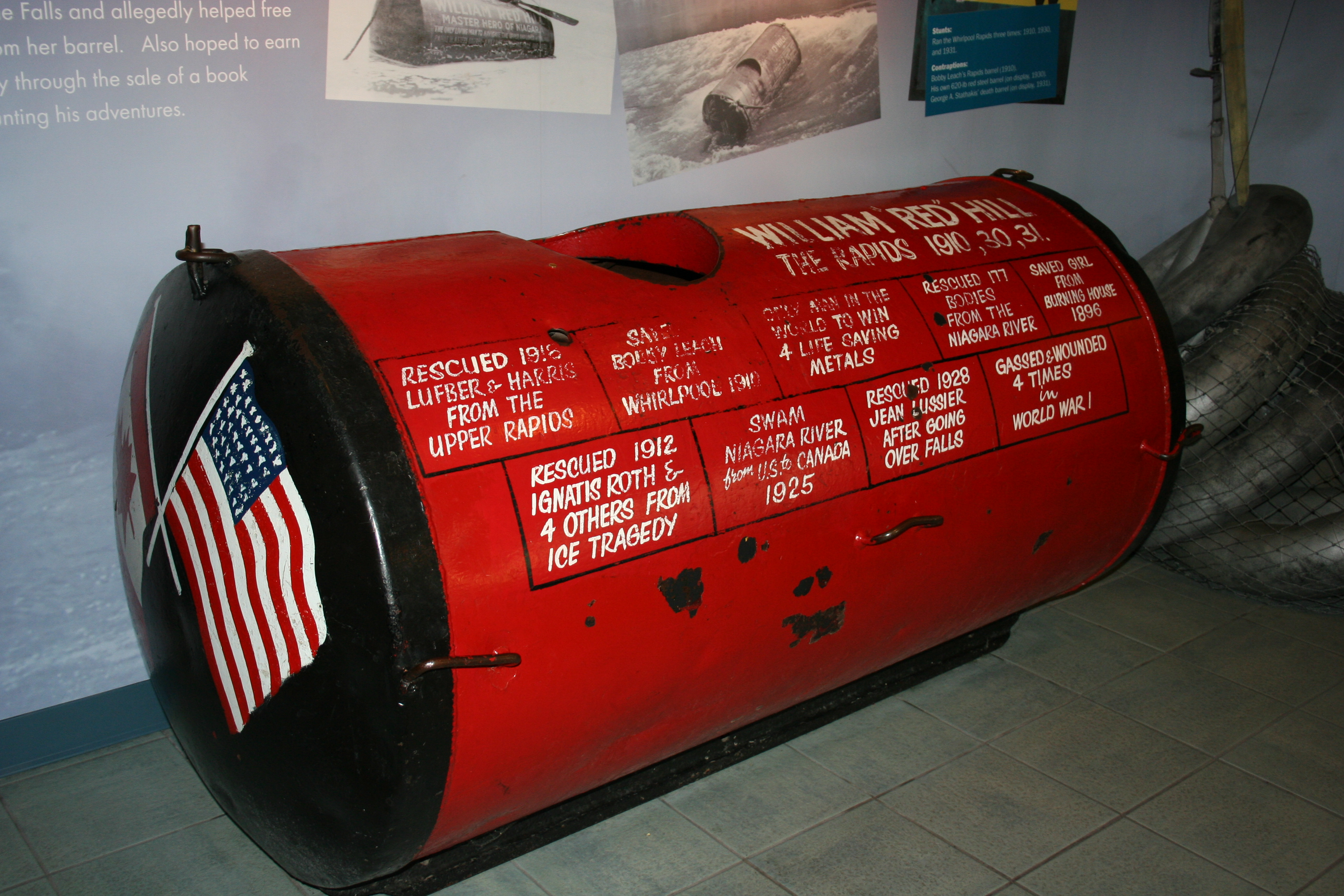
Hill's steel contraption

== Niagara daredevil ==
From a very early age, Red was obsessed by both the Niagara River and the power of Niagara Falls and would spend most of his days tossing sticks, cans, rubber tubing and anything else that would float over the falls and along the river rather than attending school.

It was the study of how the various items floated over the precipice of the falls and how they would reappear in the rapids below that proved to be the vital source of knowledge that brought the young Hill much notoriety and international fame later in life.

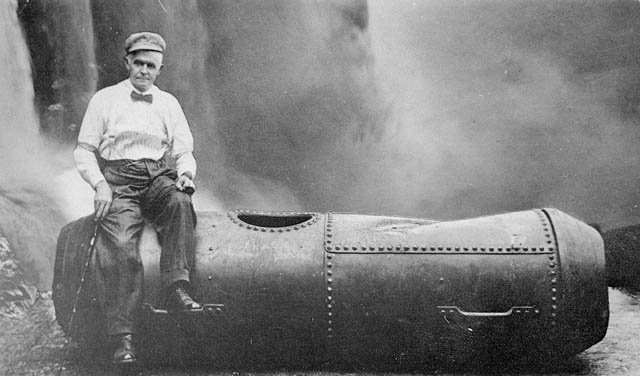
Bobby Leach and his barrel after his trip over Niagara Falls, 1911

When Bobby Leach tempted fate by going over the great Horseshoe Falls in his crude steel barrel in 1911, it was Red Hill that retrieved the barrel and extracted the battered but otherwise healthy Leach from the steel conveyance. Hill again came to the rescue of Leach following his failed attempt to swim the Niagara Gorge in 1920, just ten years after his plunge over the falls. Following Leach's rescue, Hill climbed into the barrel himself and proceeded down the Niagara Gorge rapids several miles downriver to Queenston, Ontario.

== Challenging the Niagara rapids ==
Red Hill's second trip through the Niagara rapids came on May 30, 1931, this time choosing a steel barrel 6 feet (1.8 m) long and 3 feet (0.91 m) in diameter. The opening was a 14-by-18-inch (360 mm × 460 mm) manhole, covered by sliding steel and sealed with rubber gaskets. There were air holes on each side, which were plugged with cork and could be removed. The contraption weighed over 600 pounds (270 kg) and was painted red with gold lettering that read "William Red Hill, Master Hero of Niagara" inscribed on both sides.

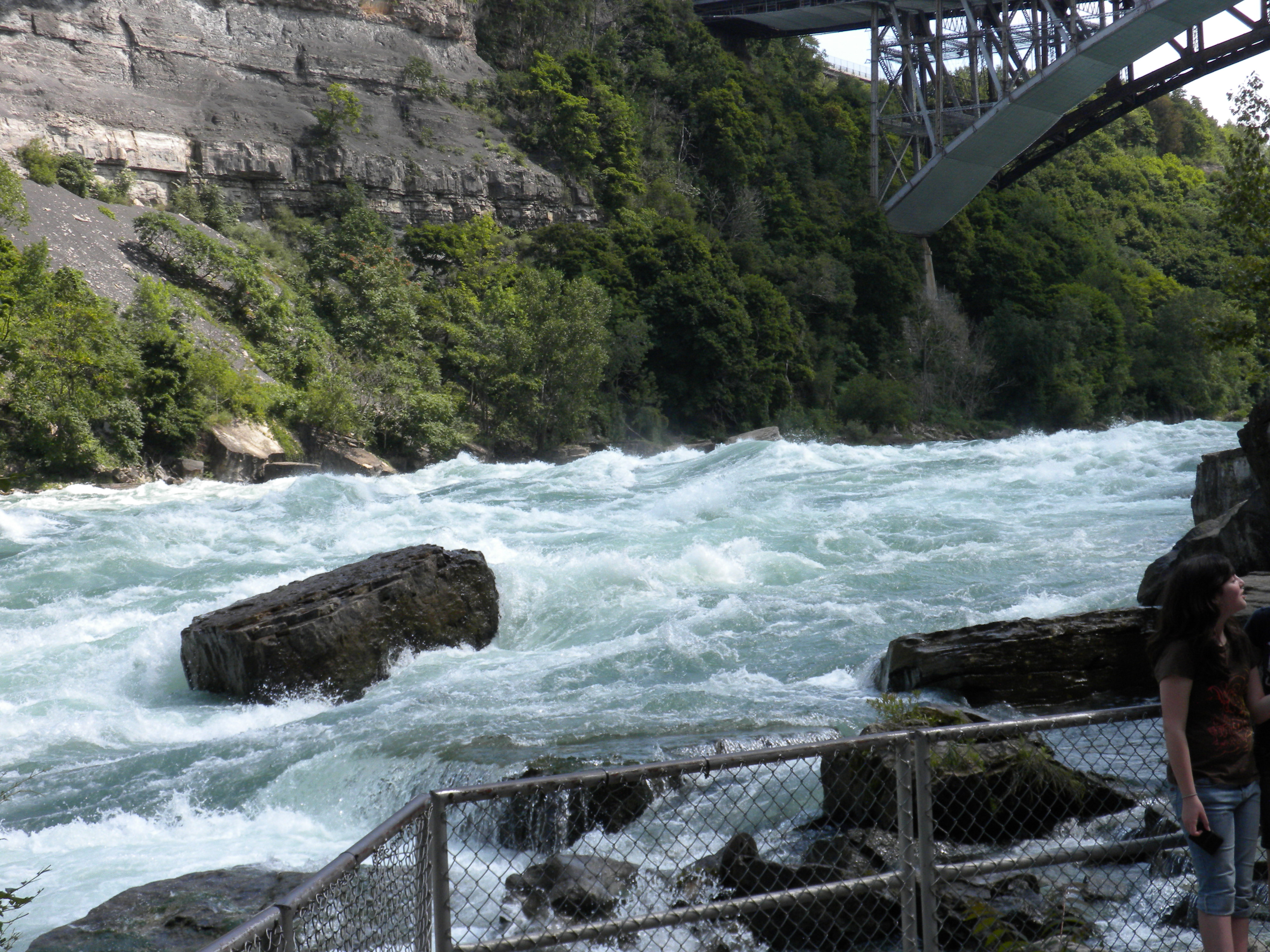
Niagara River Rapids

An estimated 25,000 spectators watched Hill attempt to conquer the rapids which got off to a slow start as the barrel bobbed and bucked in the raging river for an hour and forty minutes before arriving in the lower rapids. In less than 90 seconds he had entered the mighty Niagara Whirlpool with its extremely strong currents and become trapped as his barrel violently spun in circles for more than three hours. At one point he had opened the steel hatch and tried to paddle against the current to free himself, but to no avail. It was only through the efforts of his son William "Red" Hill Jr., who swam out to the floundering barrel with a rope attached to his waist, that the senior Hill survived.

The next day the 42-year-old Hill went back to the whirlpool, retrieved his contraption and continued the final leg of his journey to Queenston, Ontario where he emerged triumphant, with only a few minor cuts and bruises.

== Ice bridge collapse ==
In the early part of the century, thousands of tourists would venture out onto the ice bridge that forms in the pool at the base of the falls during extremely cold winters. On February 4, 1912, while operating a small shanty that served hot beverages and snacks on the frozen river to tourists that were visiting the "Ice bridge", he heard the ice below him tremble and he immediately sensed disaster.

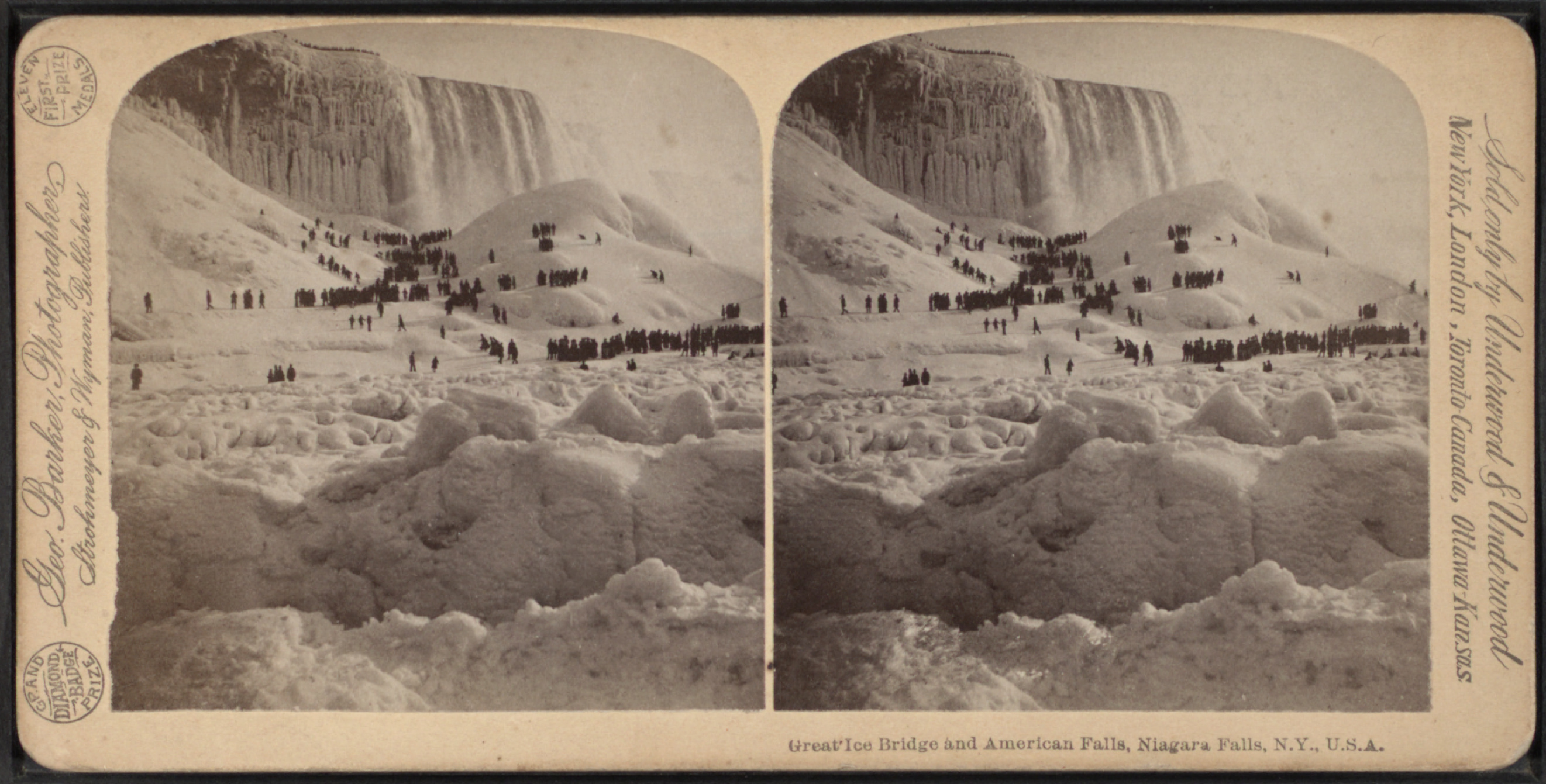
Niagara Ice Bridge 1900s

He realized the ice was breaking up below and tried to wave the spectators to safety on the Canadian side. Realizing that four people were still on the ice, Red Hill Sr. returned and managed to pull one person, 17 year old Ignatius Roth, to safety; they reached the Canadian side. Three others were not so fortunate in spite of rescue efforts that included Hill, at least partly because they ignored his advice and tried to reach the American side of the falls instead.

Despite efforts to drop ropes from the bridges, the three were swept to their deaths and their bodies never recovered.

== The Niagara Scow incident ==
On August 6, 1918, the Niagara Scow carrying two men broke the line that had kept it attached to a tugboat, and the swift current in the upper river brought the scow close to the brink of the Horseshoe Falls. The two men on the scow, Gustave F Lofberg and Frank Harris of the Great Lakes Dredge and Docks Company, tried to slow the scow. Some reports suggest that they opened two latches on the bottom of the scow to allow water to enter in order to ground the vessel, but others indicate they did not have time to do so. In any event, the vessel did become caught on some rocks roughly 750 metres (2,500 feet) upriver from the brink.

Darkness was approaching when the United States Coast Guard mounted their gun on the roof of the Toronto Power House and shot a rope to the scow.

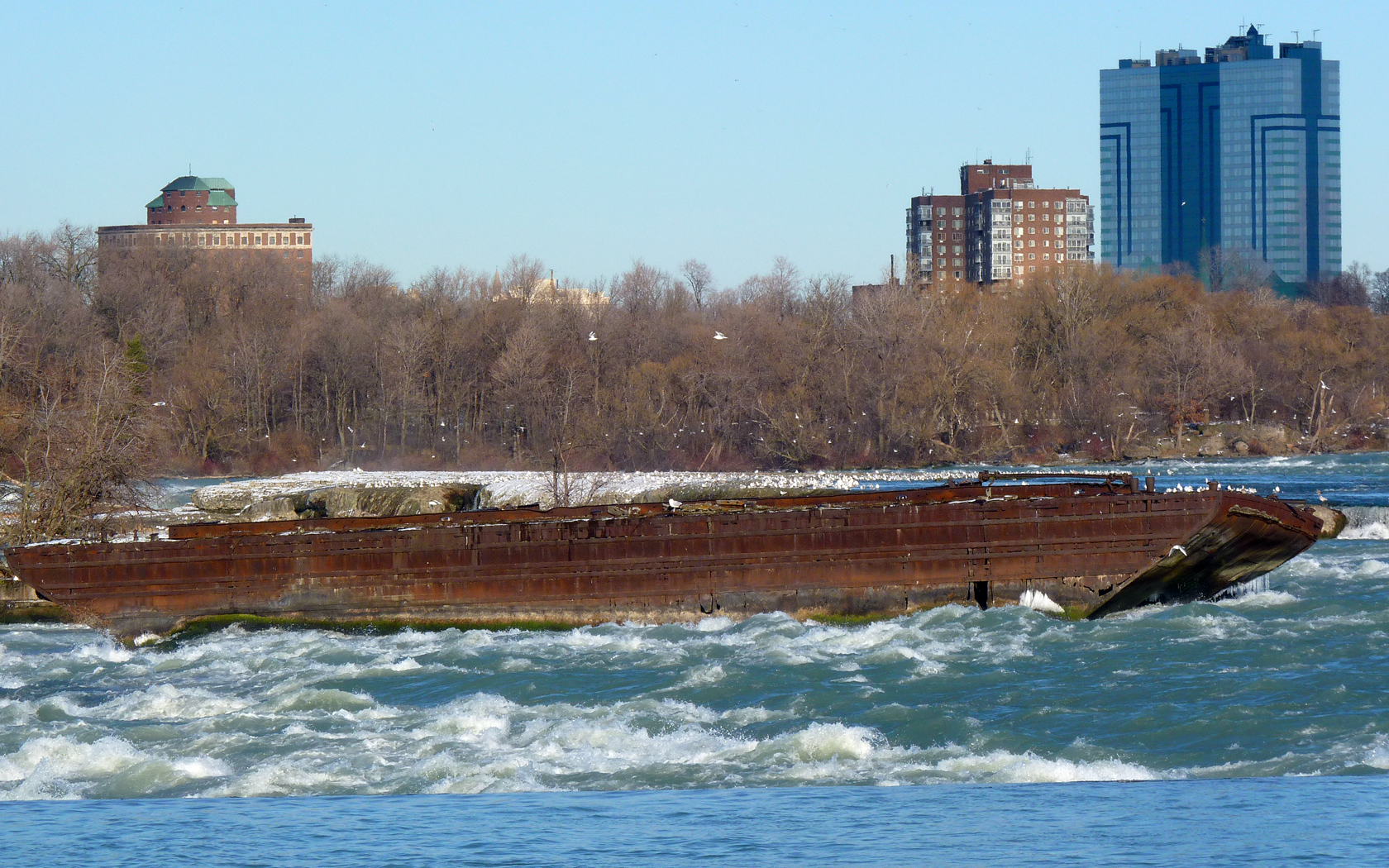
The old scow just above the Horseshoe Falls (2009 photo)

A breeches buoy was then sent out but became tangled and snarled. Red Hill Sr. volunteered to try to reach the men. Using the rope, Red Hill Sr. set out at 3 a.m. with spotlights glaring to light his path. A wrong move on his part would bring almost certain death. Hand over hand Red Hill struggled against the strong current to reach his destination, however, hindered by darkness, Hill was not able to untangle the ropes and gave up at 3 a.m. The rescue was called off until the light of day. By 8:30 a.m., Red Hill was again attempting to free the ropes, this time being successful with the aid of the men on the scow.

By 10 a.m. the men had been safely returned to the shore. According to historian Sherman Zavitz, "If it hadn’t been for (Hill’s) willingness, the story might not have had such a happy ending". Hill was awarded a Carnegie Hero Fund Carnegie Medal for his role in saving Lofberg and Harris.

At the time of the rescue, Hill had been home for only a few days after four years of service in France during World War I, where he had been gassed and wounded. He had been awarded two medals for bravery and returned to Canada in a badly underweight condition.

Today visitors to Niagara Falls can still see the badly deteriorated old scow in the river above the Horseshoe Falls, although its location shifted by about 50 metres during a storm on 31 October 2019. It shifted again October 31, 2025.

== History and legacy ==
He made the journey down the Niagara River three more times before his death in 1942 at the age of 54. Hill was not only recognized for his trips down the lower rapids, but also for his love of the river. An avid "rivers man", he was credited with having pulled 177 bodies from Niagara's waters. He also participated in many rescue efforts of stranded individuals, saving the lives of 28 people who would have drowned if it had not been for his actions.

Hill had invented a grappling device that he used successfully to recover bodies from the river without getting stuck on the bottom of the flow. According to a 1951 article, "it was so effective that enquiries were received about it from places as far away as Kansas. Manufacturing this invention in quantity might have been a profitable venture but Red Sr. and his sons didn’t do anything about it". Although he charged a small fee for recovering bodies from the river, he failed to profit from his daredevil escapades because he chose not to sell tickets to the spectators.

Red Hill was the father of three daughters, Edith Hill, Helen Hill and Margaret Hill, and four sons, Red Hill Jr. (who also went on to become a daredevil), Major Lloyd (his given name), Corky and Wesley. One of these sons also played a role in the history of stunting at Niagara Falls.

During his later years Red Hill sold pictures of himself and displayed his barrel in a local souvenir shop. Red Hill Sr. died in a Niagara Falls, Ontario hospital from effects of the gassing that he sustained during the First World War. He was 54 years old.

In 2018, the Niagara Parks Commission celebrated the 100th anniversary of the Niagara Scow rescue, particularly Hill's role, and installed a new plaque and panels depicting the event.

The character Tom Cole (local riverman and grandson of another famed riverman) from The Day the Falls Stood Still, by Cathy Marie Buchanan, was inspired by Red Hill Sr.

=== Following his father's lead ===
Red Hill Sr. passed his love of the Niagara River onto his son William "Red" Hill Jr., who made the trip down the lower rapids several times following in his father's footsteps. Hill Jr., however, had a bigger purpose for his feats, to raise funds for a memorial fund to honour his father. His stunts, however, did not raise sufficient funds and so he decided to increase the stakes by performing a stunt even his father would not attempt, taking a barrel over Horseshoe Falls.

This barrel was unlike any other, as it was constructed of 13 large inflated inner tubes that were held together by canvas webbing, encased by heavy-gauge fish netting. He had named his barrel "The Thing", and on August 5, 1951, he set off at Chippawa, with thousands of curiosity seekers looking on. The trip started out as planned, as the barrel rode the upper rapids toward the brink of the Horseshoe Falls. The barrel made it over the cataract, however it did not take long for onlookers to realize that the stunt had gone terribly wrong. "The Thing", which had dropped 167 feet (51 m), had been shattered and broken apart from the pressure of the water and the great fall. Red Hill Jr. did not survive; his battered body was found the next morning at the Maid of the Mist landing.
