= Bobby Leach =

Global entertainer

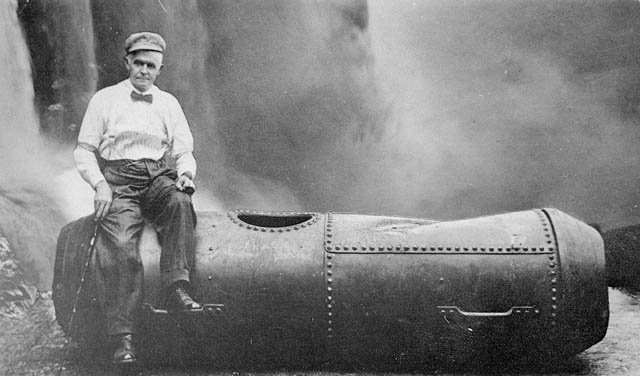
Bobby Leach and his barrel after his trip over Niagara Falls, 1911.

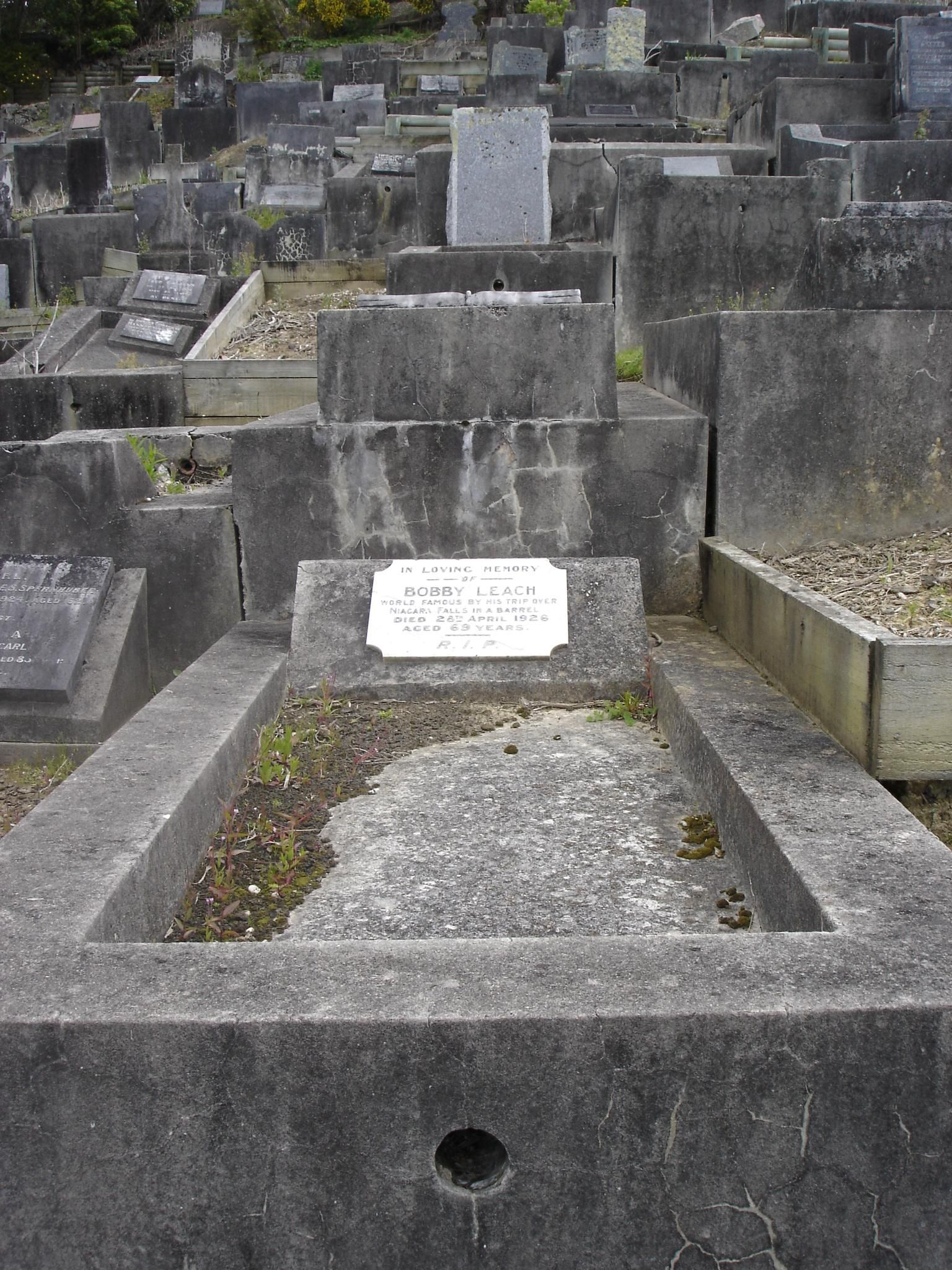
Bobby Leach's grave, Hillsborough Cemetery, Auckland, New Zealand.

Bobby Leach (1858 – April 28, 1926) was the second person and first man to go over Niagara Falls in a barrel, accomplishing the feat on July 25, 1911 — while Annie Taylor did it on October 24, 1901. He spent six months in the hospital recovering from injuries he sustained during the fall, which included two broken knee caps and a fractured jaw. Leach had been a performer with the Barnum and Bailey Circus and was no stranger to stunting. After watching a stuntman die attempting to dive from a platform over 150 feet (45 m) into a pool 5 feet (1.5 m) deep, he made the dive successfully. Prior to his trip over the falls, he owned a restaurant on Bridge Street, and would boast to customers that anything Annie could do, he could do better.

Leach utilized a steel barrel to achieve the feat.

Leach returned to Niagara Falls, New York, in 1920 and operated a pool hall. While in his sixties he attempted to swim the whirlpool rapids but failed after several attempts. During these aborted attempts, Bobby Leach was rescued by William "Red" Hill Sr., a riverman, who knew the Falls well and became well known in the area for later rescues.

In 1926, while on a publicity tour in New Zealand, Leach injured his leg when he slipped on an orange peel. The leg became infected, and eventually gangrene necessitated the amputation of the leg. Leach died of complications two months later.

== In popular culture ==
- In the Season 2 of CBBC's adaptation of Horrible Histories, Bobby Leach is played by Jim Howick and is described by the Reaper (played by Simon Farnaby) as "another stupid Victorian swimmer", referring to Bobby's fellow countryman and colleague, Matthew Webb (also played by Jim Howick in the Season 1) and Matthew's death in the Niagara Falls
- In Primus' song from the Brown Album, 'Over the Falls', the plot describes a man who is strapping himself into a metal capsule and preparing for his descent over the falls in an attempt at fame. The song's music video includes an exact recreation of the metal capsule that Robert Leach had made.

== Notes ==
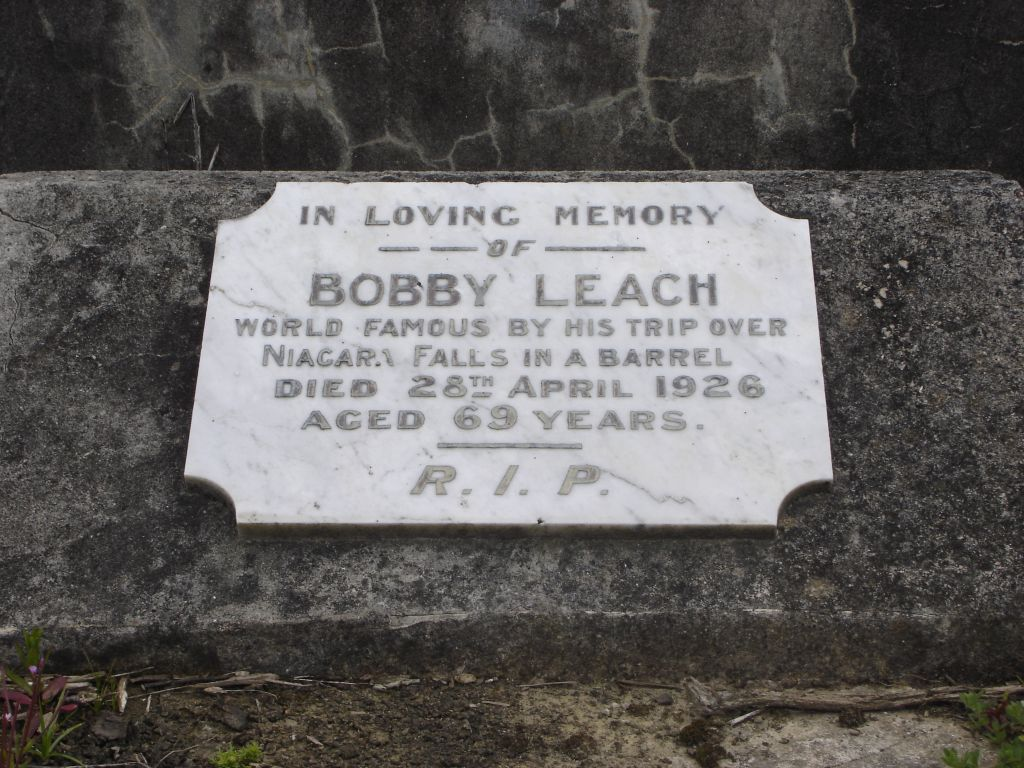
Bobby Leach's headstone.
