= Prospect Park Incline Railway =

Stereo image
Left frame
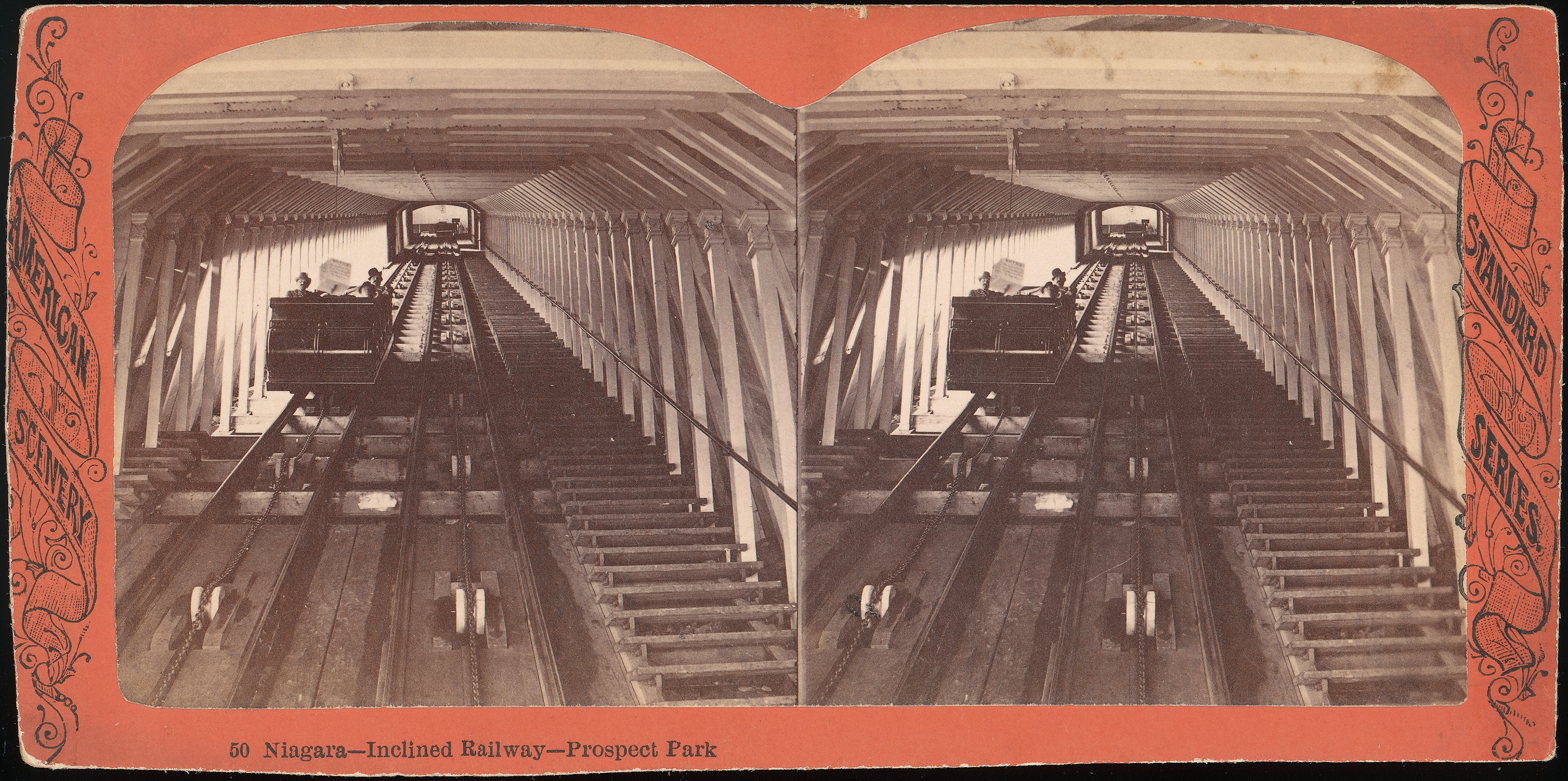
Right frame
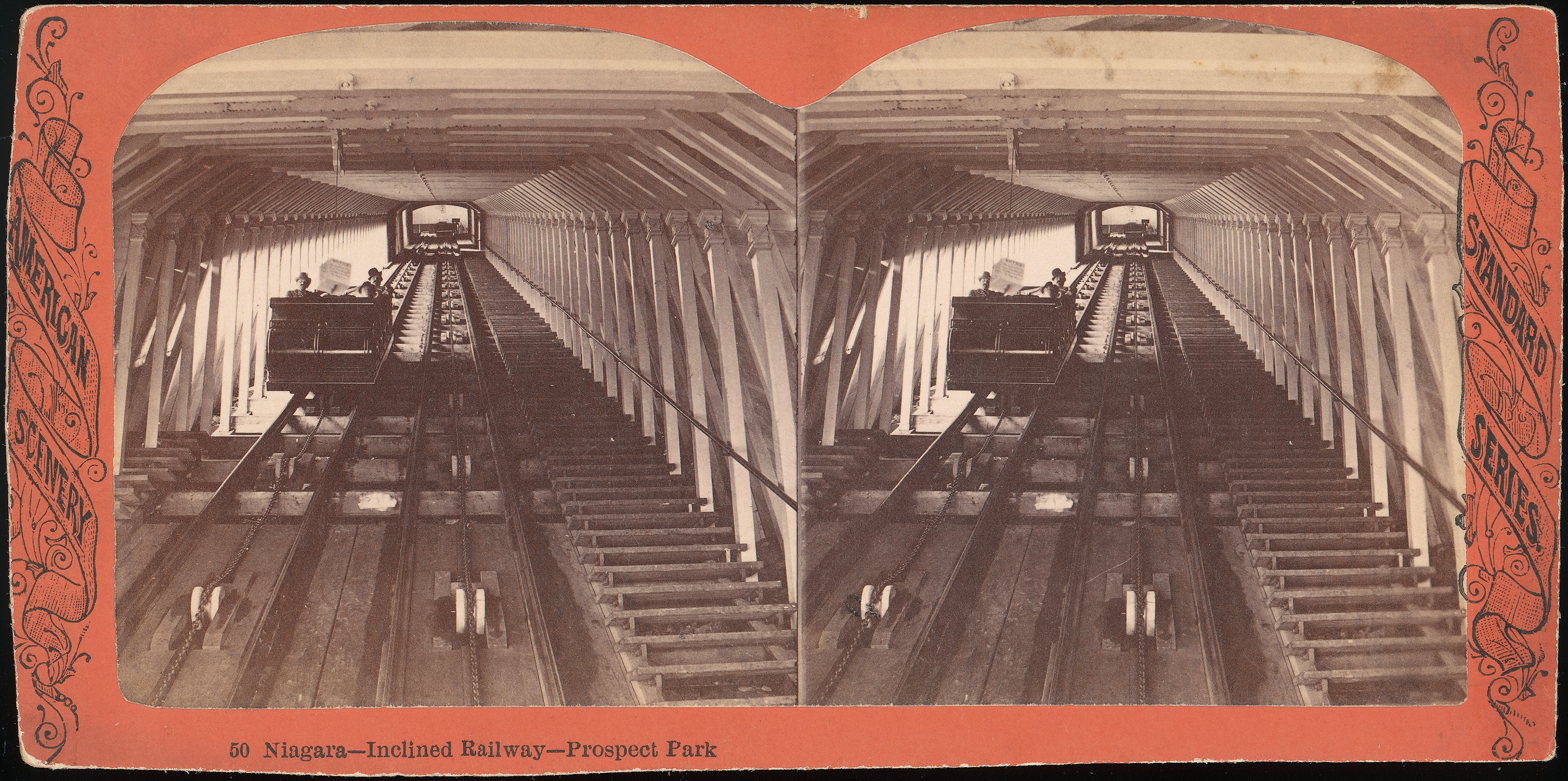
Parallel view
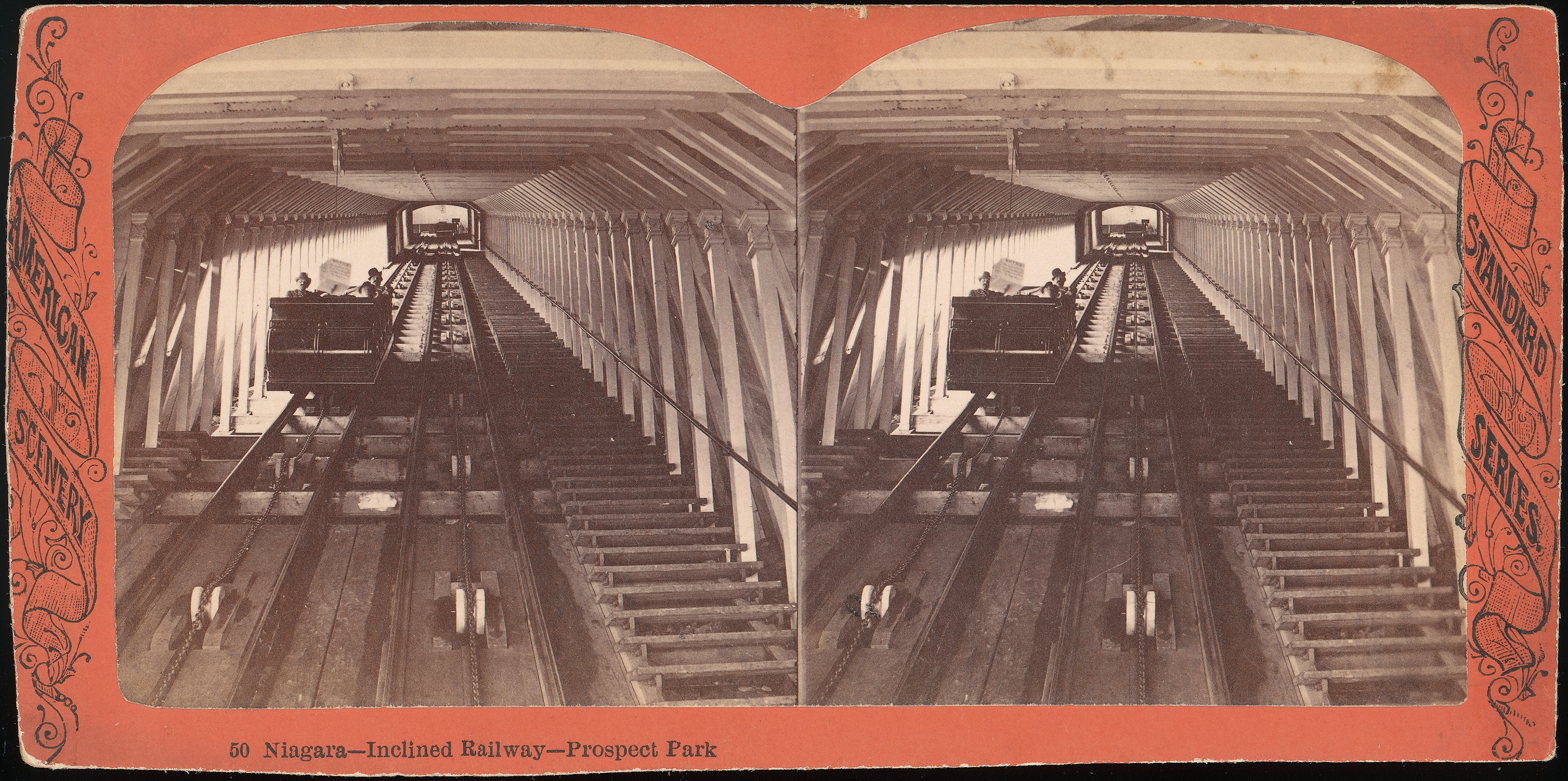
Cross-eye view
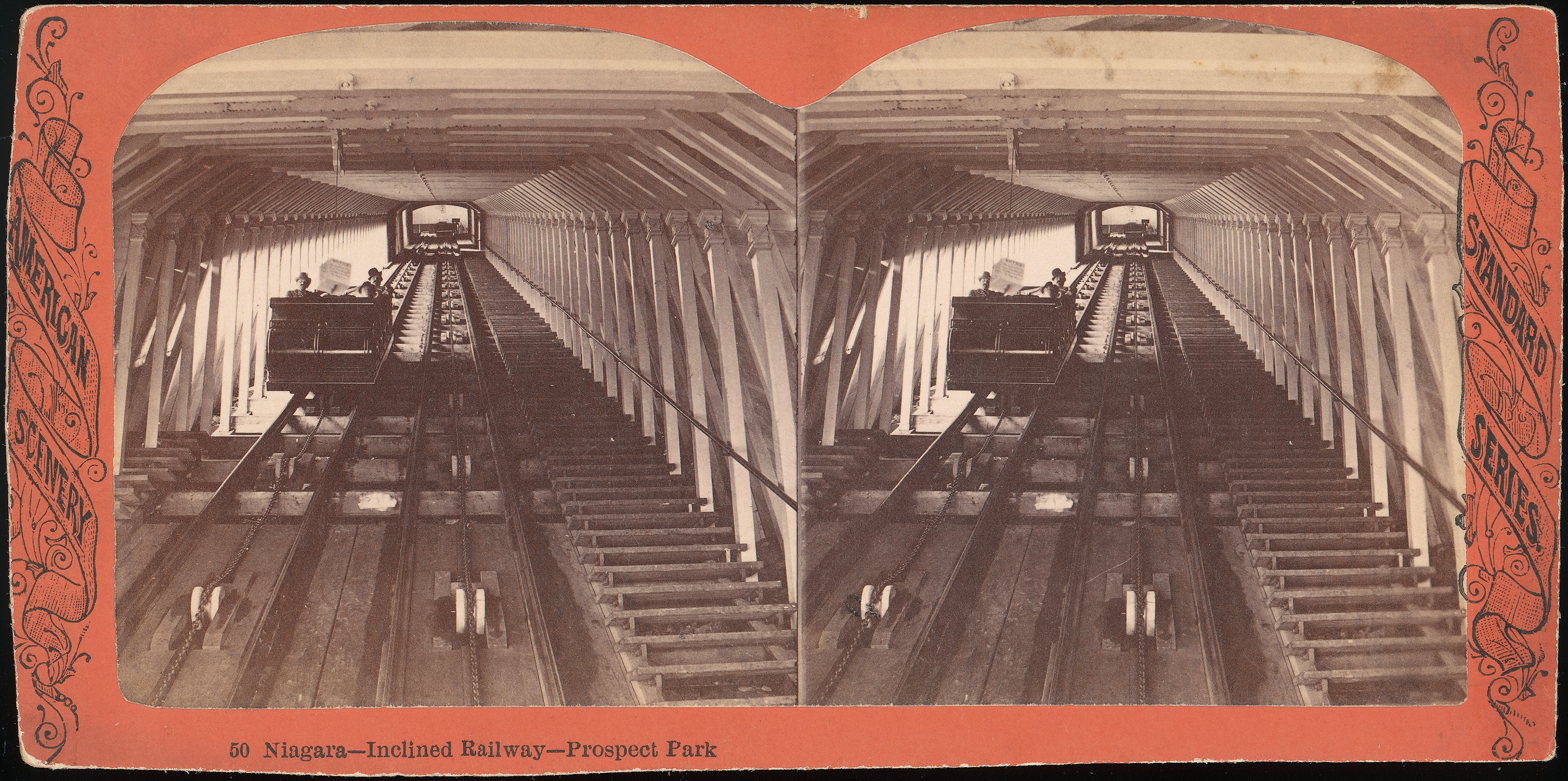

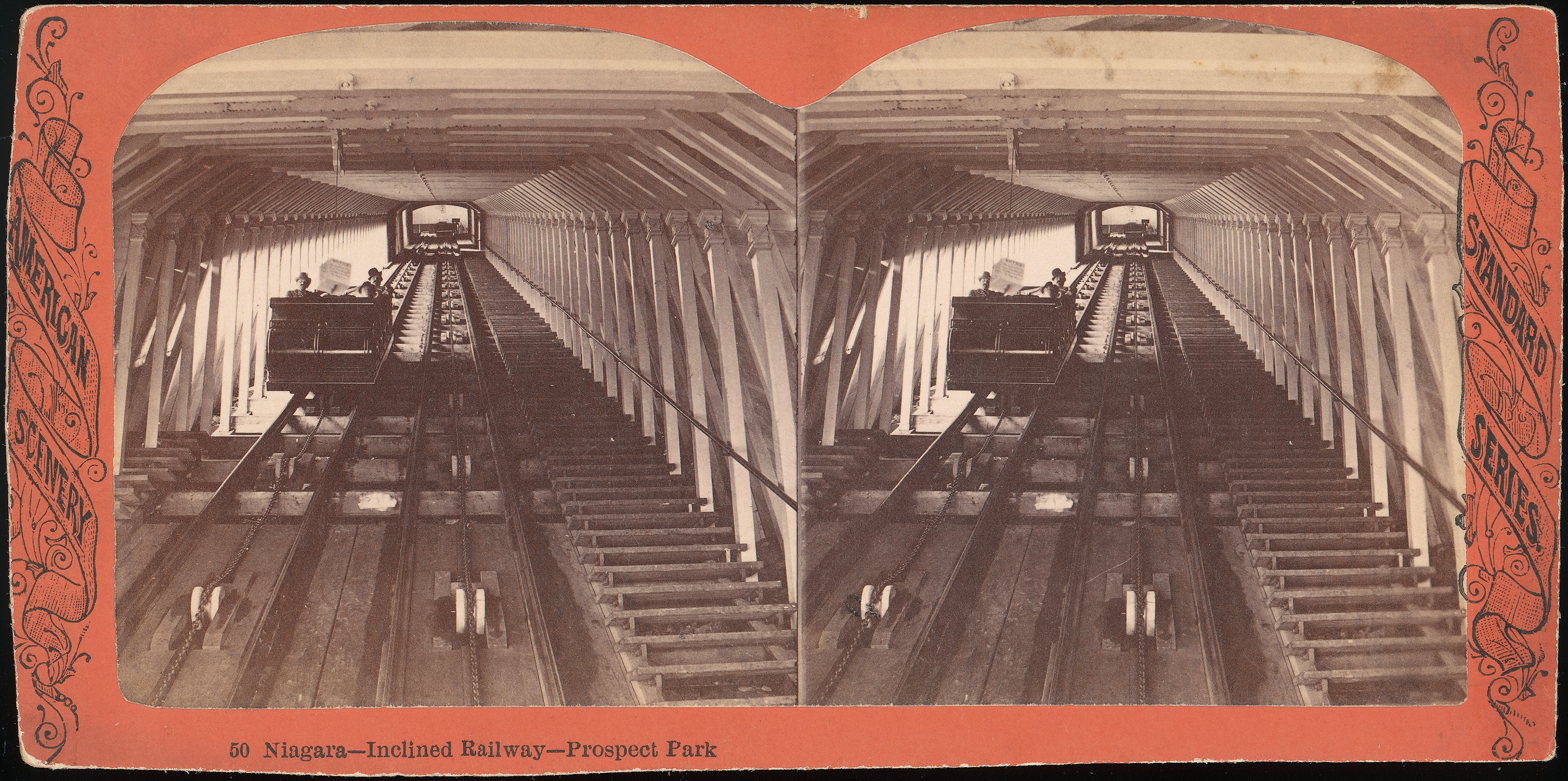
- 1860-1890s stereopair

The Prospect Park Incline Railway was a funicular railway in the city of Niagara Falls, New York, United States. It was built in 1845 on the United States side of the Niagara Falls at Prospect Point Park. An accident in 1907 claimed a single life and lead to the closure of this line.

The incline railway was covered and consisted of two parallel rail tracks leading from the top of the gorge to the bottom, with each track carrying an open railcar with a capacity of 15-20 passengers. The line was originally on water counterbalance principals, but was later converted to electrical operation.

Following the 1907 accident, the funicular railway was removed in 1908. In 1910, it was replaced with elevators, which operated in separate shafts drilled through the rock and opened out to a building at the base of the gorge. In 1960 the elevators were closed due to a rock fall. The elevators were replaced with the current Prospect Point Observation Tower in 1961.

== See also ==
- Incline railways at Niagara Falls
- List of funicular railways
- Niagara Parks Commission People Mover
- Spanish Aerocar
