= Niagara Glen =

Canadian nature reserve

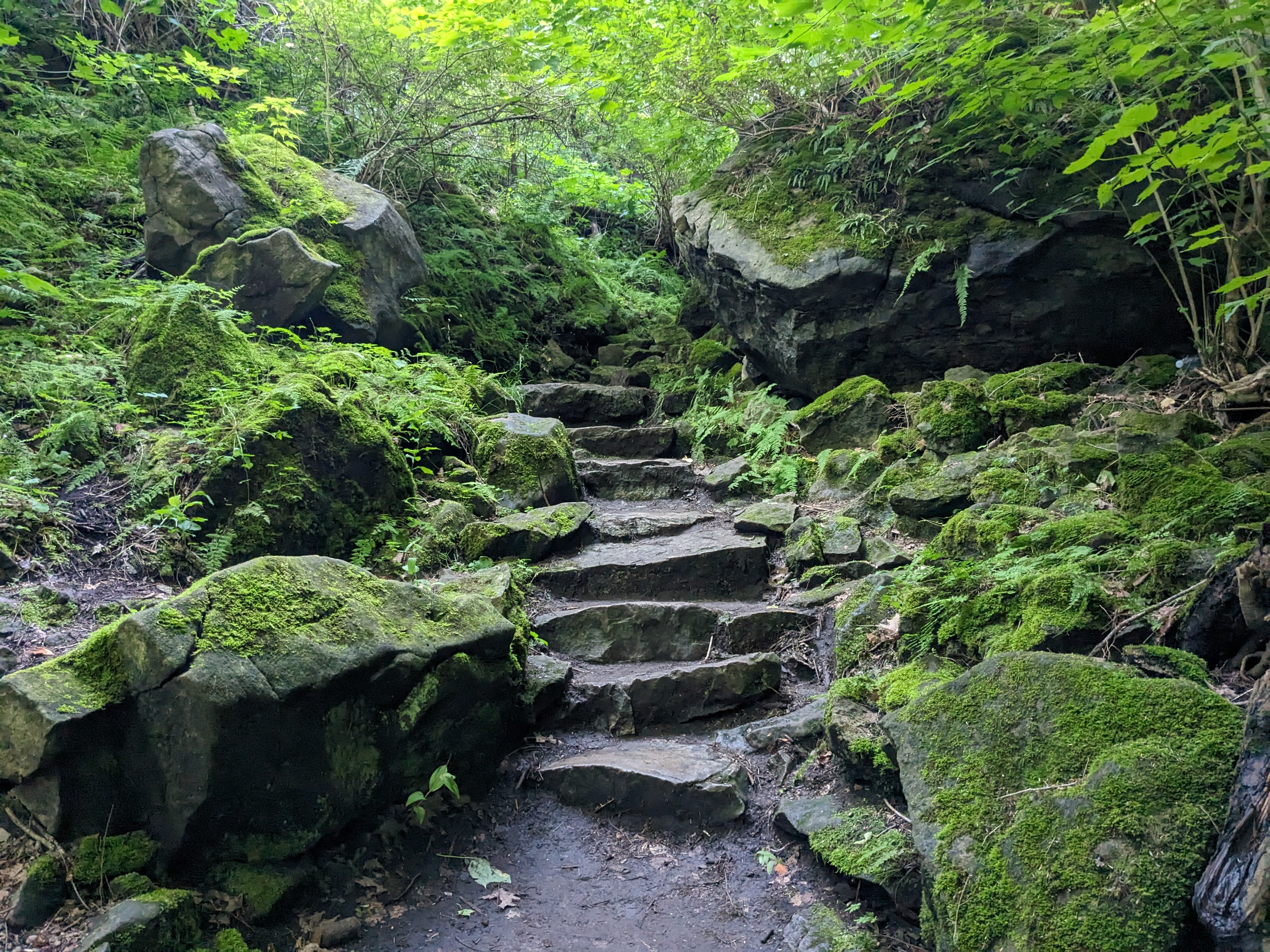
- Staircase at Niagara Glen

- Location within Ontario
- Location: Niagara Region, Ontario, Canada
- Coordinates: 43°07′46″N 79°03′34″W
- Governing body: Niagara Parks Commission

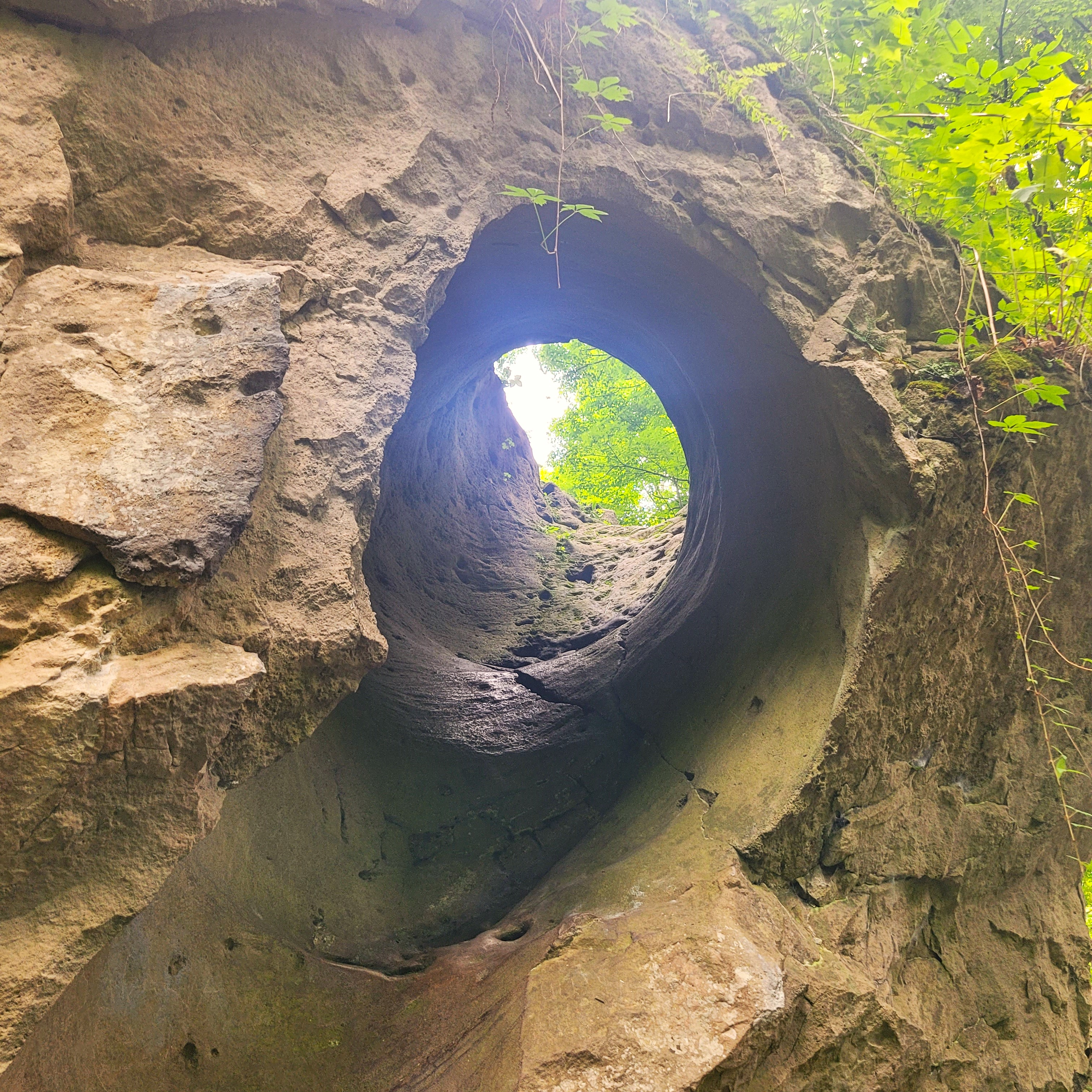
Mammoth Pothole at Terrace Path

Niagara Glen is a nature reserve located near the Niagara Whirlpool along the Canadian side of the Niagara Gorge. It is one of the best preserved remaining examples of Southern Ontario's original Carolinian forest. The park is operated by the Niagara Parks Commission, an agency of the Ontario government. The park features overlooks of the whirlpool and gorge as well as several hiking trails through the Carolinian forest. The nature reserve also protects a pristine area of the Niagara Escarpment.

== Rock climbing ==
The glen is a prominent rock climbing area in Southern Ontario, being home to a large concentration of limestone boulders. In 2003, the Niagara Parks Commission recognized that people were using the area for climbing and there were debates about whether or not to allow the practice to continue. Initial restrictions on bouldering were due to concerns about environmental protection. In 2012, a bouldering permit system was developed jointly by the Niagara Parks Commission and the Ontario Alliance of Climbers to preserve climbing access, manage a significant growth in climbers and preserve sensitive vegetation adjacent to climbing areas.

== Rescues ==
Entering the Niagara River from the hiking trail is dangerous and has resulted in emergency rescues. Rescues can be difficult and involve various government agencies such as the Niagara Parks Police, fire departments, emergency medical services, Canadian Coast Guard, and United States Coast Guard. The Niagara River contains rapids which are life-threatening. Hikers are advised to not leave marked trails for their own safety.
