= Falls Incline Railway =

Railway line in Canada

Coordinates: 43.079499°N 79.080789°W

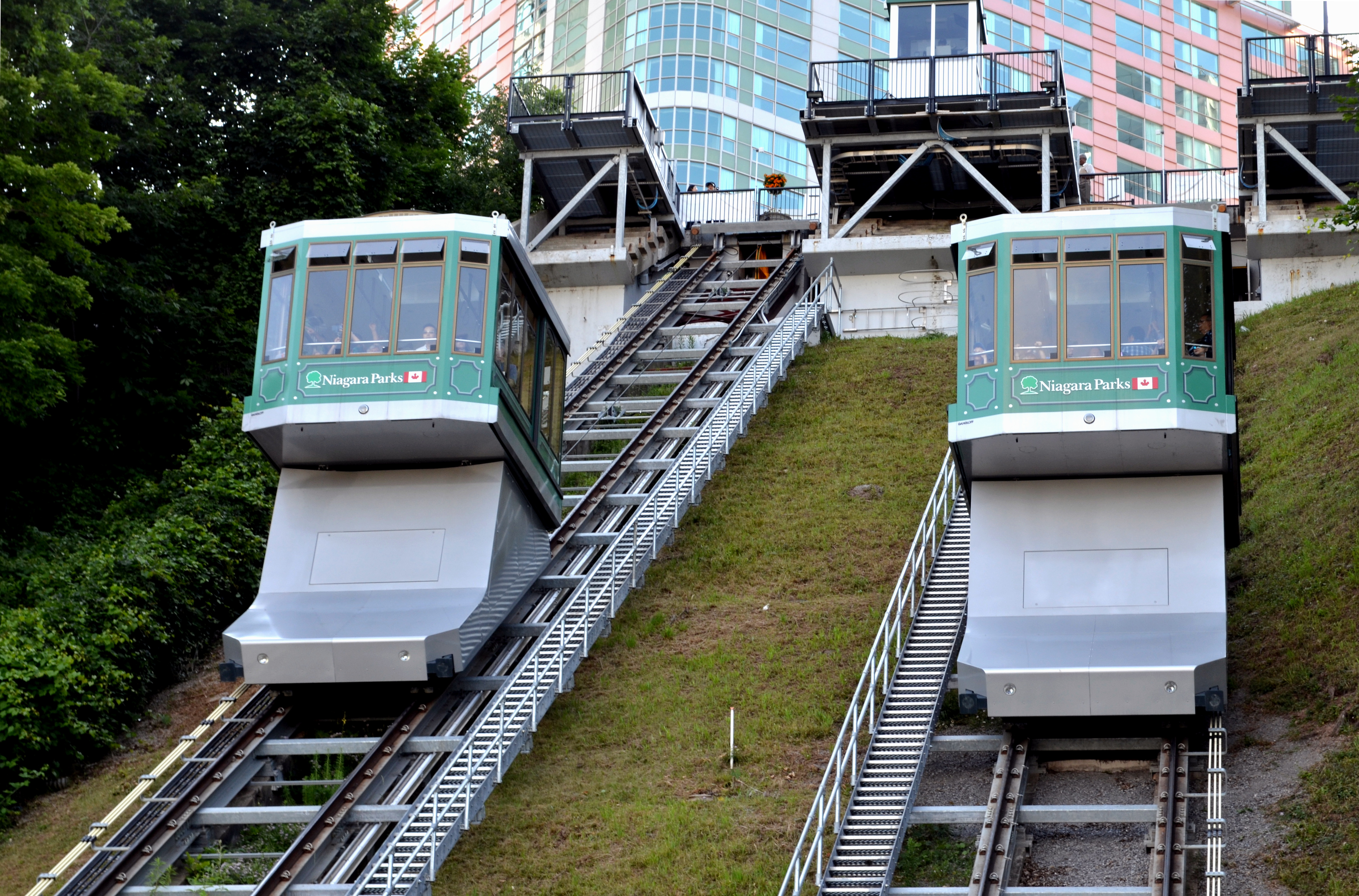

Overview
- Locale: Niagara Falls, Ontario; Canada
- Transit type: Funicular
- Website: www.niagaraparks.com/attractions/falls-incline-railway.html

Operation
- Began operation: October 8, 1966
- Operator: Niagara Parks Commission

Technical
- System length: 59.8 m (196.2 ft)
- Track gauge: 1,850 mm (6 ft 27/32 in)
- Average speed: 3.5 km/h (2.2 mph)

The Falls Incline Railway, originally known as the Horseshoe Falls Incline is a type of funicular railway (an inclined elevator) in the city of Niagara Falls, Ontario, Canada. It is located beside Niagara Falls at the Horseshoe Falls. The line was built in 1966 for the Niagara Parks Commission by the Swiss company Von Roll. It adopted its current name in the 1980s. Originally built with open-air cars, it was rebuilt in 2013 with enclosed cars to permit year-round operation.

Unlike the other incline railways at Niagara Falls, the Falls Incline was not built to descend into the Niagara Gorge below the falls. Instead it links the Table Rock Centre and Journey Behind the Falls, on the Niagara Parkway just above the falls to the higher level Fallsview Tourist Area, including the Minolta Tower, the Niagara Fallsview Casino Resort and several hotels.

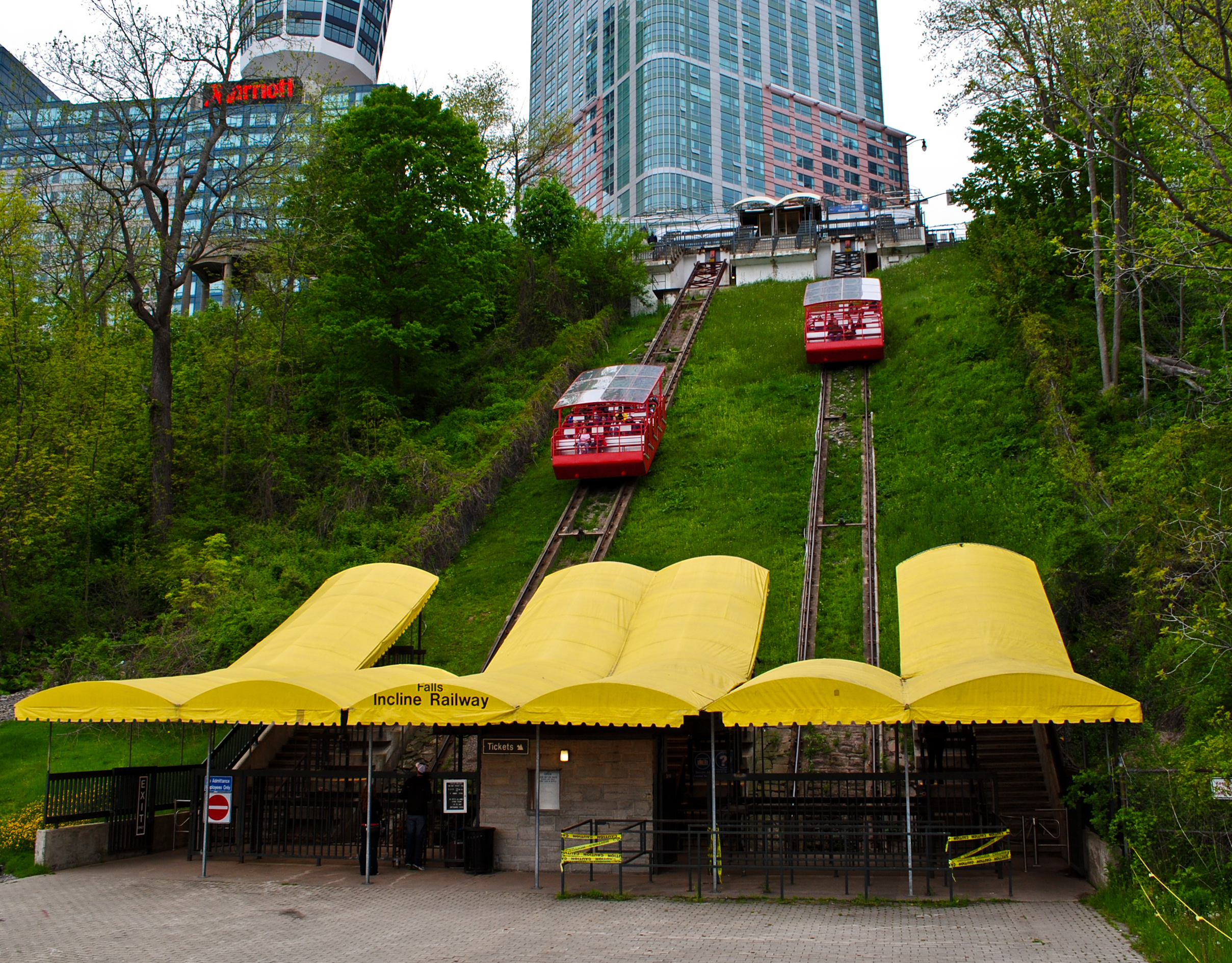
The Falls Incline Railway in 2010, before being rebuilt

The Niagara Parks Commission claims that the funicular is the world's slowest.

The funicular has the following technical parameters:

- Length: 59.8 metres (196 ft)
- Slope: 30 degrees
- Cars: 2
- Capacity: 40 passengers per car
- Configuration: Double track
- Maximum speed: 1 metre per second (197 ft/min)
- Journey time: 62 seconds
- Track gauge: 1,850 mm (6 ft 27/32 in)
- Traction: Electricity

== See also ==
- Incline railways at Niagara Falls
- List of funicular railways
