= Devil's Hole State Park =

State park in New York, United States

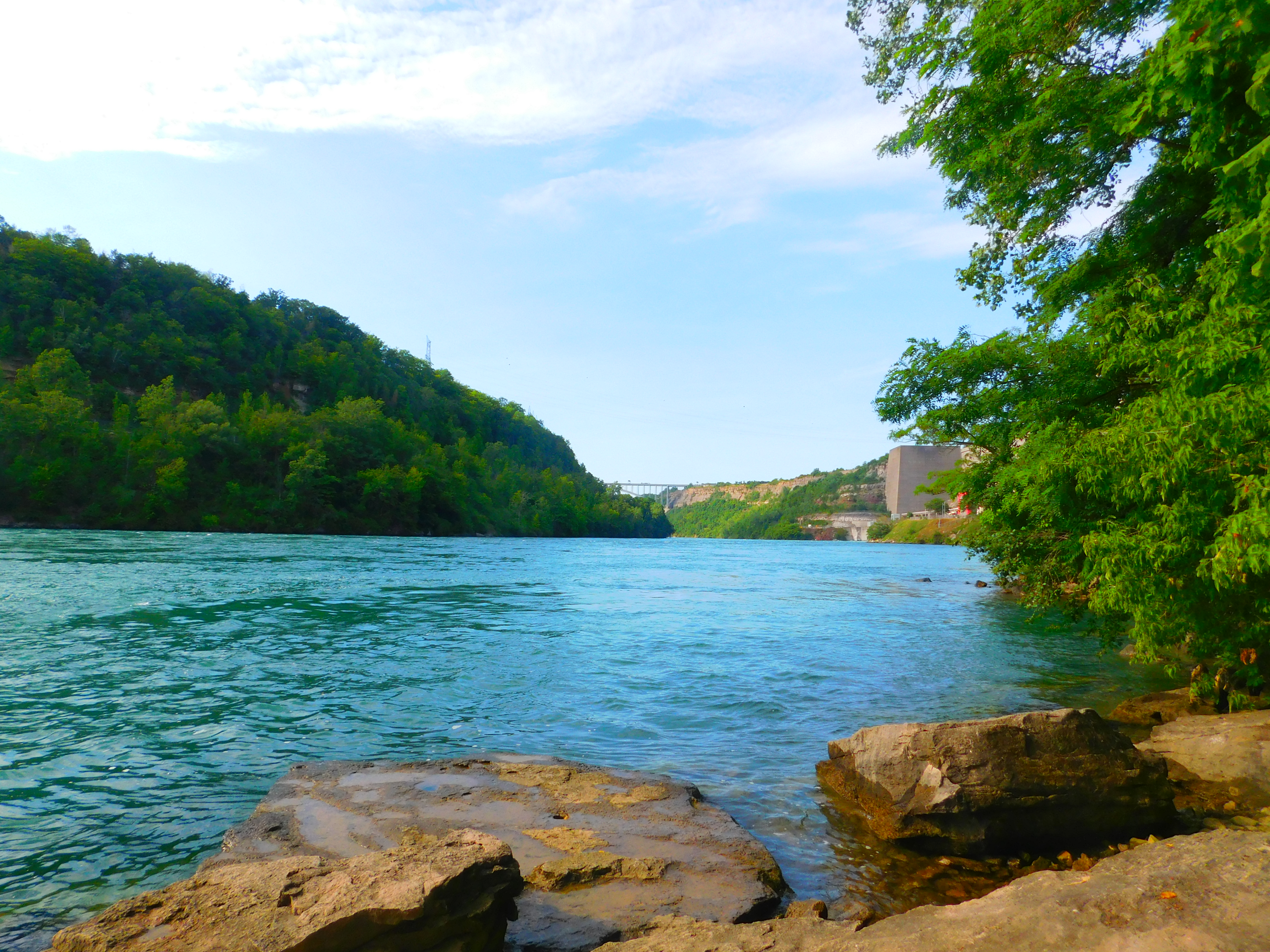
- Devil's Hole State Park, July 2016

- Location within New York
- Type: State park
- Location: Robert Moses Parkway; Niagara Falls, New York
- Nearest city: Niagara Falls, New York
- Coordinates: 43°08′06″N 79°02′46″W
- Area: 42 acres (17 ha)
- Created: 1924
- Operator: New York State Office of Parks, Recreation and Historic Preservation
- Visitors: 158,816 (in 2016)
- Open: All year
- Website: Devil's Hole State Park

Devil's Hole State Park is a 42-acre (17 ha) state park located in Niagara County, New York, north of the City of Niagara Falls. The day-use park overlooks the lower Niagara River Gorge.

== History ==
Devil's Hole State Park is located along a segment of the Niagara Portage, a historically important route used by Native Americans to transport canoes around Niagara Falls and the rapids on the Niagara River. It was the location of an early battle between European settlers and Native Americans over control of the portage route.

The park was opened in 1924, and is one of the oldest state parks in the region, although it was preceded by Niagara Falls State Park.

== Description ==
Devil's Hole State Park is a 42-acre (17 ha) day-use park that allows fishing, hiking, picnic tables, snowshoeing, and cross-country skiing. A popular trail descends into the Niagara River Gorge to allow close access to the rapids below, however off-trail hiking is prohibited due to dangerous conditions.

The park is connected with nearby Whirlpool State Park via the Devil's Hole Trail at the gorge's bottom, as well as a trail along the gorge's rim, which together form a complete loop.

== See also ==
- List of New York state parks
