= Hornblower Niagara Funicular =

Coordinates: 43.0888°N 79.0725°W

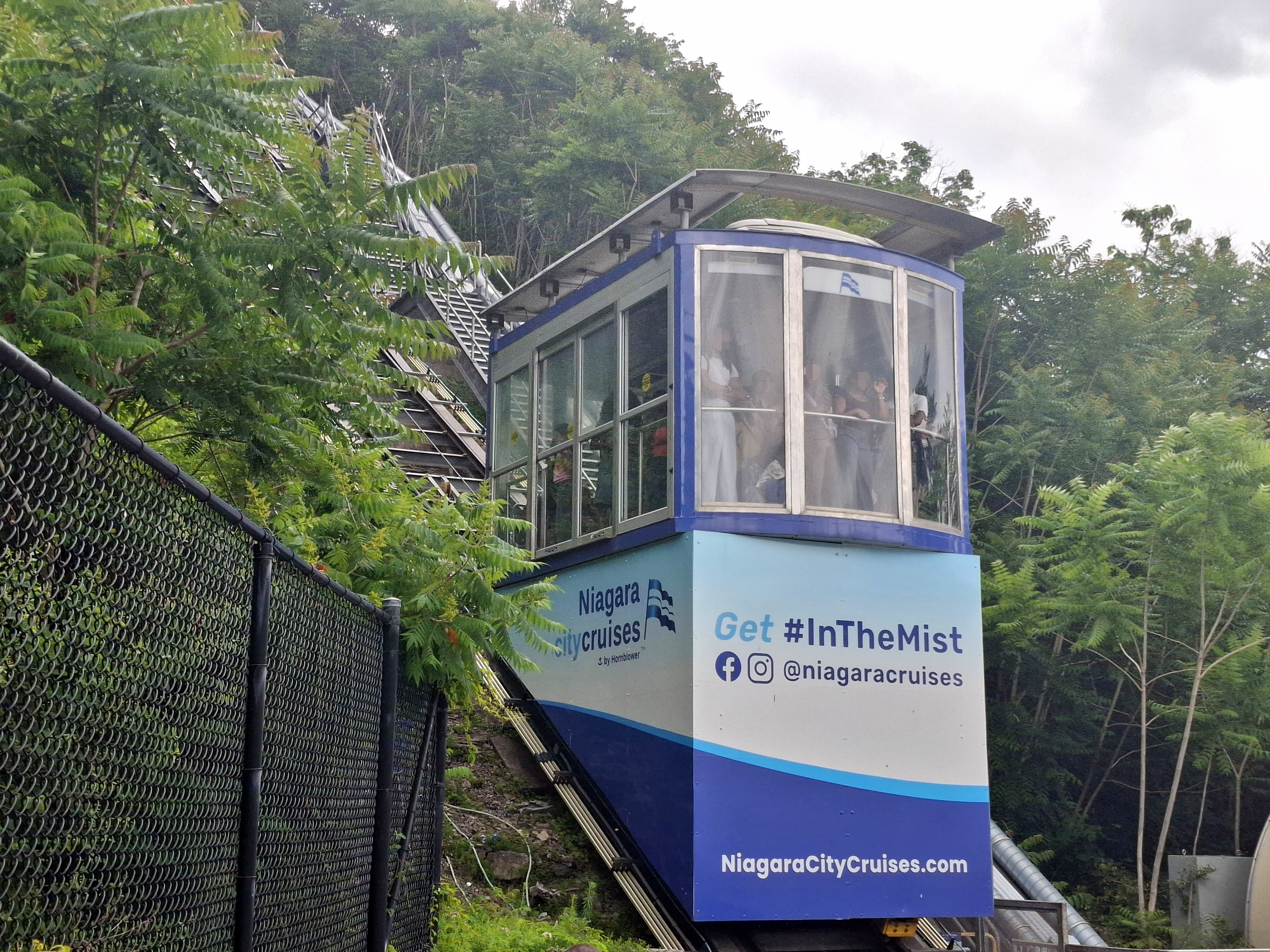
The modern Hornblower Niagara Funicular in June 2026.

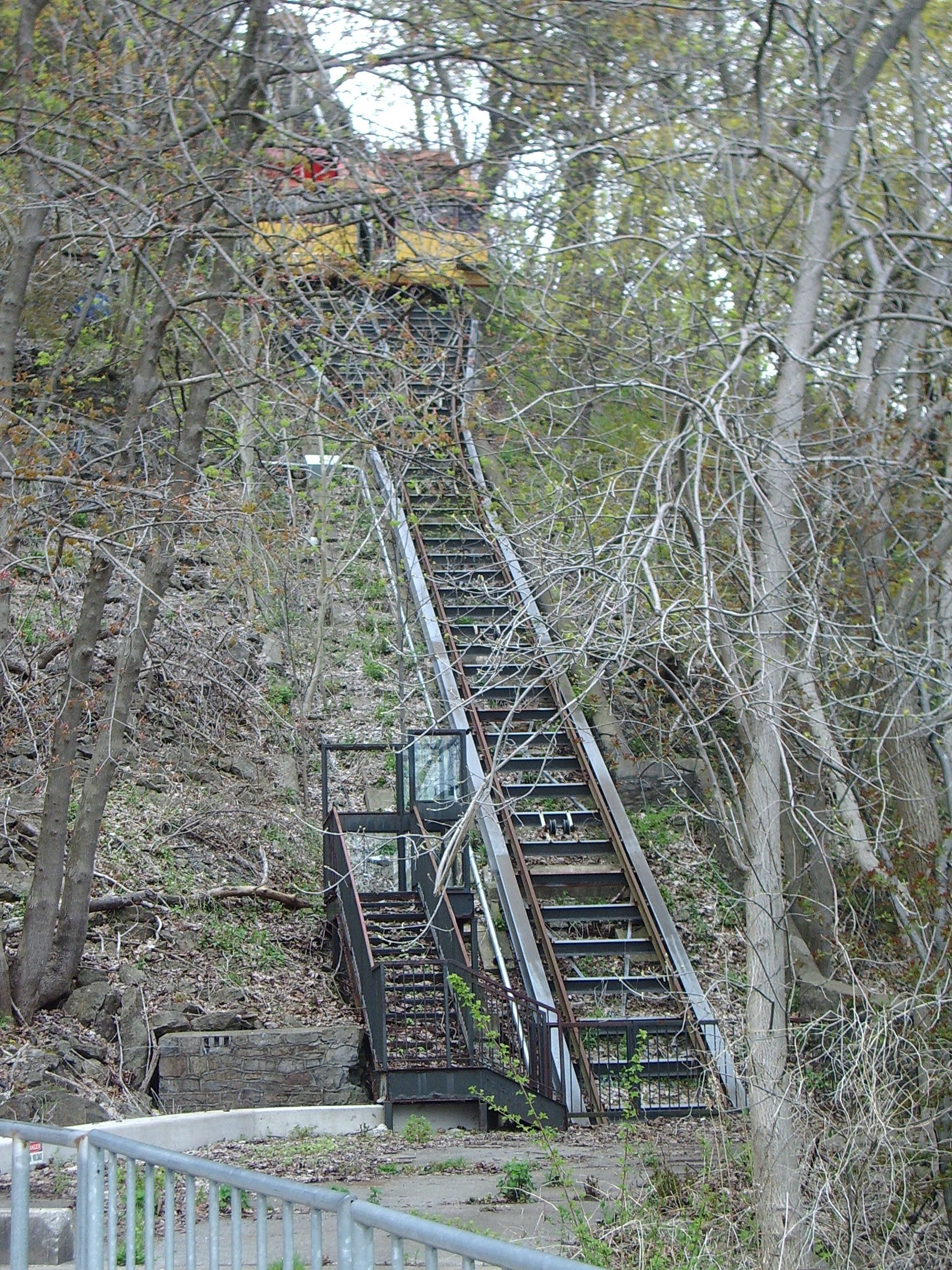
The then-abandoned Maid of the Mist Incline, photographed in spring 2005. The overgrown track has since been cleared and the 1977 cars replaced

The Hornblower Niagara Funicular, previously called the Maid of the Mist Incline and originally known as the Clifton Incline, is a funicular railway in the city of Niagara Falls, Ontario, Canada. The line was built to convey patrons of the Maid of the Mist boat tour, and linked the foot of Clifton Hill to the boat dock below.

The line was built as the Clifton Incline in 1894. It was 50 metres (164 feet) long, was electrically hauled, and passengers were carried in two small 12-seater cars. The track splits near the bottom to allow for cars to pass. A station is located near the top of the incline. The line was renamed as the Maid of the Mist Incline in 1973, without any change to the method of operation or capacity.

The increasing size of the vessels used on the Maid of the Mist tour meant that more capacity was required, and the line was rebuilt between 1976 and 1977. When it reopened, it was served by new 24-seater cars which made the journey in 45 seconds. However even these proved inadequate for traffic, and the line finally closed in 1990 when it was replaced by a set of four elevators. Although the line closed in 1990 (replaced by elevators from the main entrance above) and became somewhat overgrown, both the track and the 1977 cars remained for decades afterwards.

After several years of construction, Hornblower Niagara Cruises reopened the incline for the 2019 season as the Hornblower Niagara Funicular to enable more traffic to the boat tour. The new system was built by AnCam Solutions Company Limited of Oakville, Ontario and Heller Manus of San Francisco. The new incline uses the same foundation and substructure of the original incline but with new, climate-controlled cars, and operates alongside the elevators.

== See also ==
- Incline railways at Niagara Falls
- List of funicular railways
