= Whirlpool State Park =

State park in Niagara County, New York

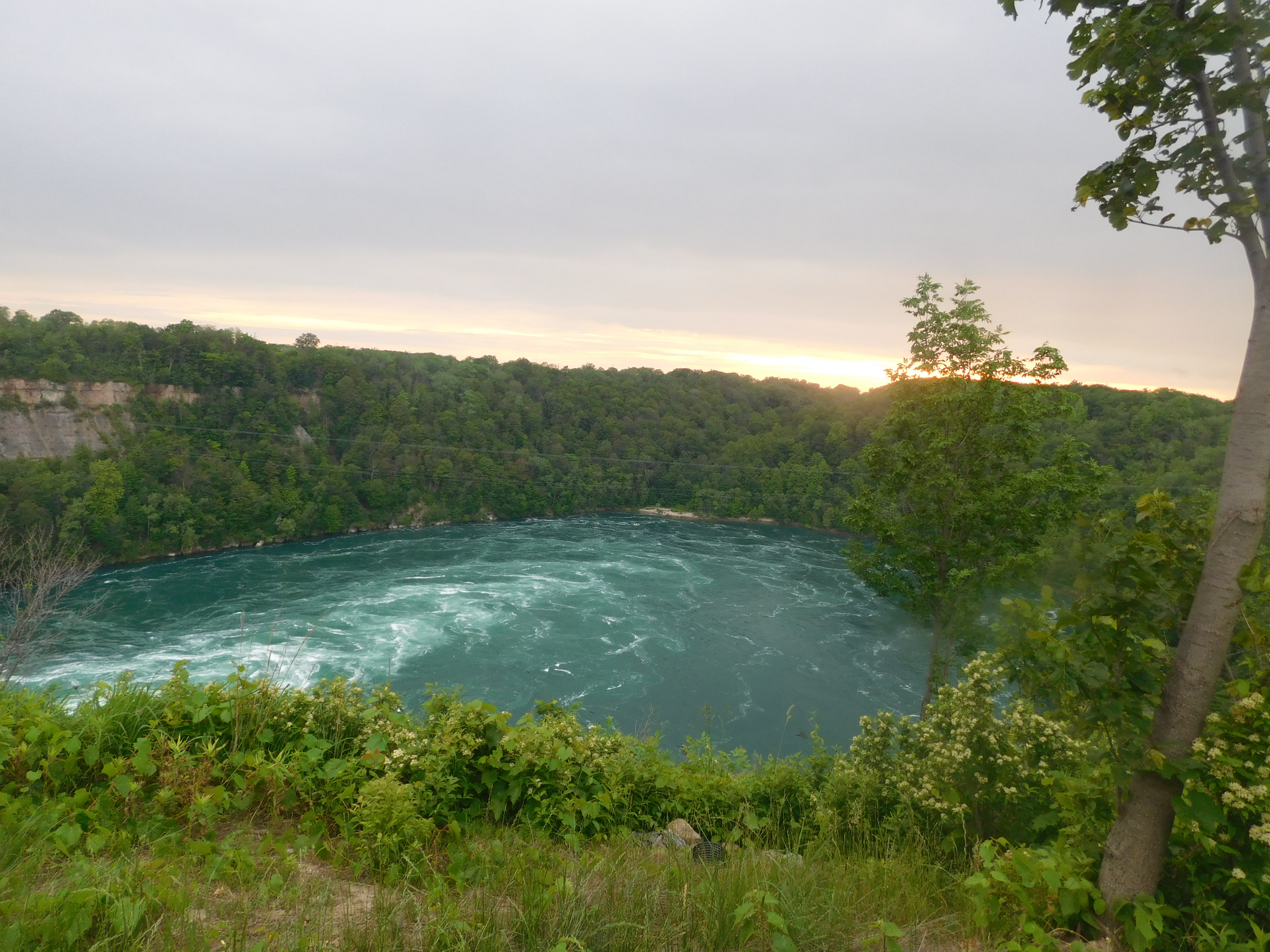
- Whirlpool State Park, June 2017

- Location within New York
- Type: State park
- Location: Robert Moses Parkway; Niagara Falls, New York
- Nearest city: Niagara Falls, New York
- Coordinates: 43°07′01″N 79°03′40″W
- Area: 109 acres (0.44 km^{2})
- Created: 1928
- Operator: New York State Office of Parks, Recreation and Historic Preservation
- Visitors: 364,528 (in 2016)
- Open: All year
- Website: Whirlpool State Park

Whirlpool State Park is a 109-acre (0.44 km^{2}) state park located in Niagara County, New York, north of the city of Niagara Falls. The park overlooks the Niagara Whirlpool on the Niagara River and the lower Niagara Gorge.

== Description ==
Whirlpool State Park is a day-use park offering a playground, picnic tables and pavilions, hiking and biking, a nature trail, fishing, and cross-country skiing. A visitor center is open during the summer months from 9 a.m. to 4:30 p.m., Wednesday through Sunday.

A stone staircase within the park descends into the Niagara Gorge; a 300-foot (91 m) section of the staircase was reconstructed in 2016. The park is connected with nearby Devil's Hole State Park via the Devil's Hole Trail at the gorge's bottom, as well as a trail along the gorge's rim, which together form a complete loop.

== See also ==
- List of New York state parks
