= Whirlpool Aero Car =

Cable car in Niagara, Ontario

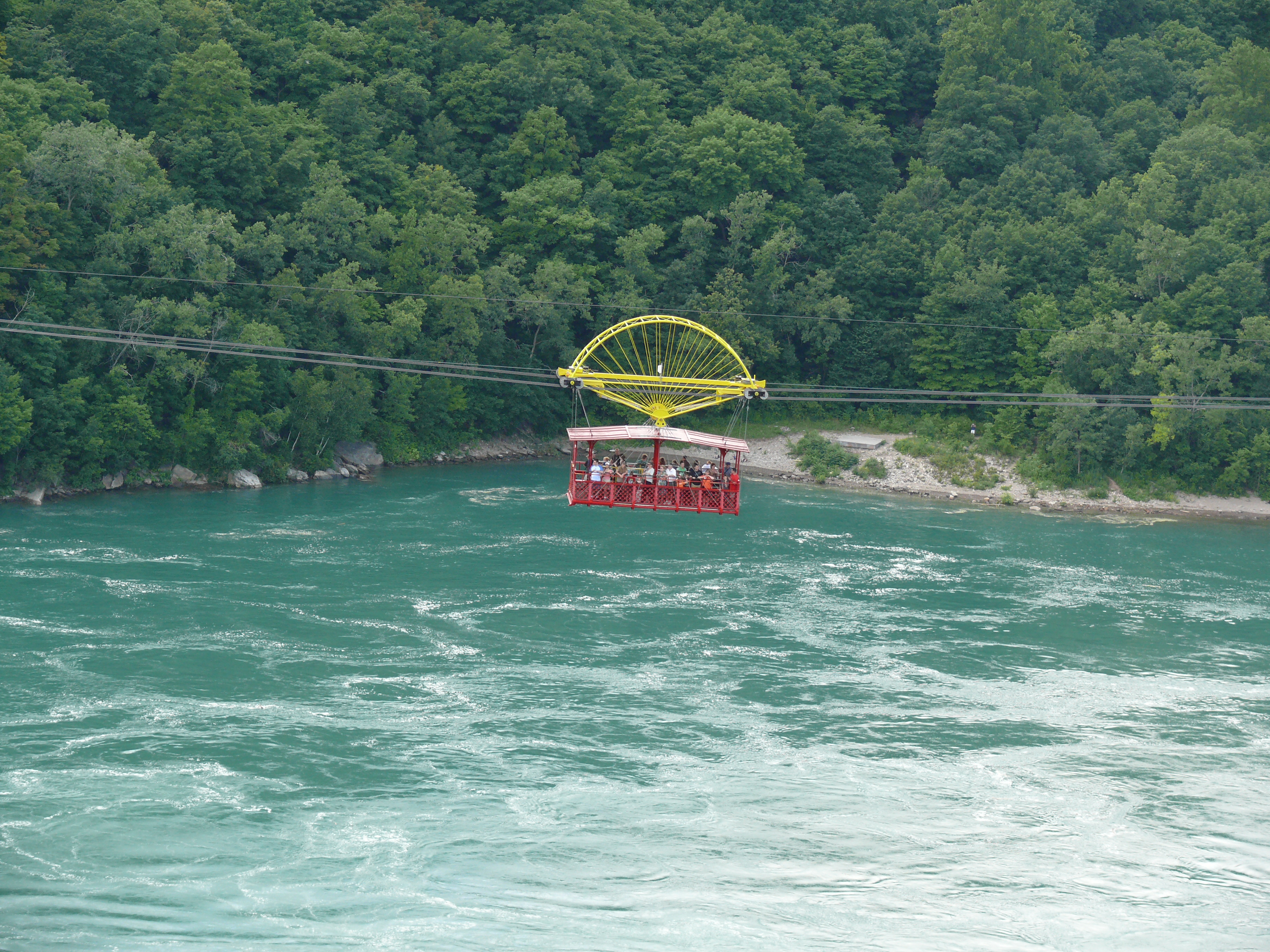
- Interactive map of Whirlpool Aero Car

Overview
- Location: Niagara Falls, Ontario
- Country: Canada
- Coordinates: 43.11798°N 79.06877°W
- Open: August 8, 1916
- Website: www.niagaraparks.com/nfgg/aerocar.php

Operation
- Operator: Niagara Parks Commission
- No. of carriers: 1
- Carrier capacity: 35
- Operating times: 10am-5pm
- Trips daily: 21
- Trip duration: 10 minutes

Technical features
- Aerial lift type: Aerial tramway
- Manufactured by: Niagara Spanish Aero Car Company Limited / Leonardo Torres Quevedo
- Line length: 1,770 feet (540 m)
- Vertical Interval: 220 feet (67 m)

The Whirlpool Aero Car or Spanish Aero Car is a cable car located in Niagara Falls, Ontario that transports passengers over a section of the Niagara River referred to as the Niagara Whirlpool. The system was designed by Spanish engineer Leonardo Torres Quevedo and has been upgraded several times since 1916 (in 1961, 1967, 1984 and 2023). The system uses one car that carries 35 standing passengers over a one-kilometre trip.

== Technical specifications ==
The Aero Car is suspended on six interlocking steel cables, each of which is 25 mm (0.98 in) in diameter. The car is powered by an electric 50 horsepower (37 kW) motor and travels at approximately 7 km/h (4.3 mph). In the event of a power failure, a diesel engine drives a hydraulic pump to pull the carrier back to the loading/unloading terminal. It also has a rescue car which holds four passengers and one operator. The rescue car has so far only been used for training purposes.

The Aero Car is suspended between two Canadian points, though it crosses the Canadian and American borders four times on a full trip. The car crosses the border about 500 feet (150 m) from the starting point and runs through United States territory for about 200 feet (61 m), but riders need no immigration clearance. At each end of the crossing, it is 220 feet (67 m) high, and in the centre, it averages 200 feet (61 m) above the river depending on the level of the water below. Its span is 1,770 feet (540 m). The rapids entering the whirlpool below the Aero Car move at an estimated 35 to 37 km/h (22 to 23 mph), and the flow of the water coming through the river is about 2,800 cubic metres per second (2.3 acre⋅ft/s; 740,000 US gal/s; 620,000 impgal/s) in the summer months, and 1,400 cubic metres per second (1.1 acre⋅ft/s; 370,000 US gal/s; 310,000 impgal/s) in the winter months. From the Aero Car, sightseers can see Whirlpool State Park in Niagara Falls, New York, as well as the Robert Moses Niagara Hydroelectric Power Station in Lewiston, New York. From the side or centre of the car, one can view the violent motion of the 60 acres (0.24 km^{2}) whirlpool below. Riders may also see hikers on nature trails and anglers on both sides of the river.

The car was originally open, but a roof has been added to all later designs. A four-person rescue car is available (a smaller silver car stored at the opposite end in an indoor area), but not used in regular service.

The car operates from 10am to 5pm from the second week of March to the first week of November. Despite the similarities between the Aero Car and ski lifts, it has not been operated in winter since 2004.

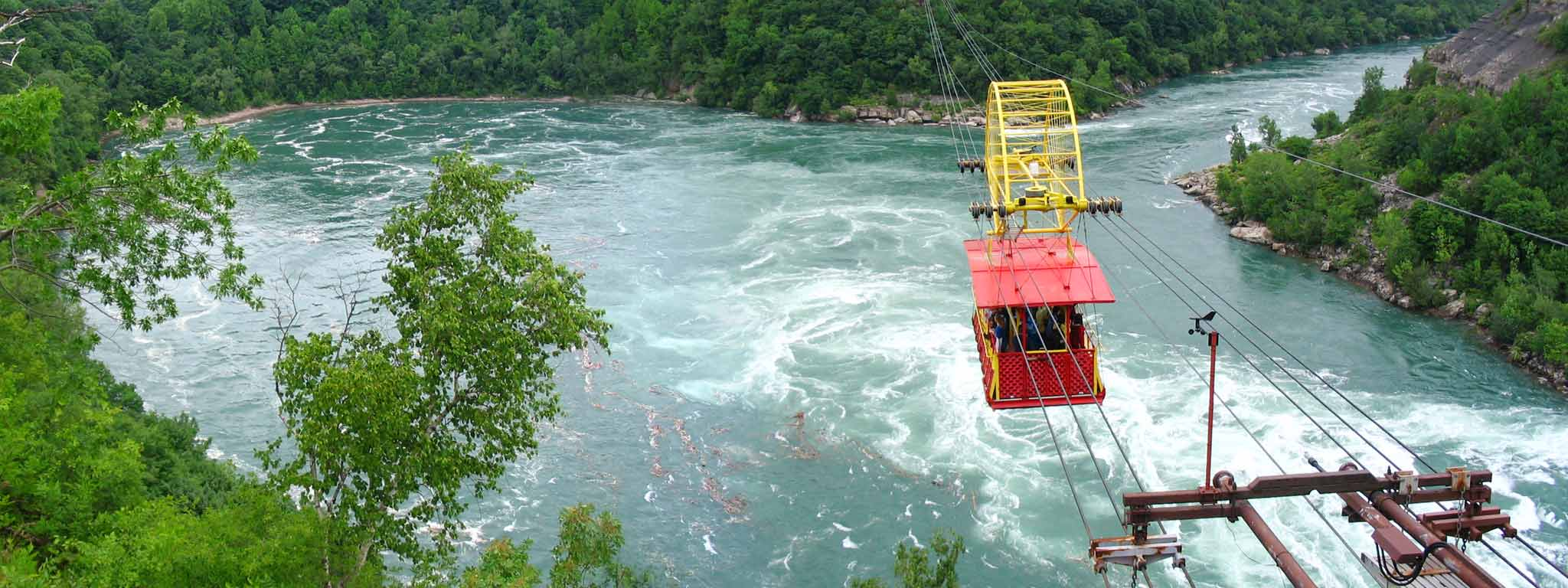
The Niagara Whirlpool with an approaching Spanish Aero Car viewed from the south station.

== History ==
On May 30, 1989, the cable was hit by a sightseeing helicopter flying too close. The landing gear of the helicopter was damaged, but the pilot managed to land on a golf course. Nobody was hurt but the ride was closed for three days to check the cable.

== Gallery ==
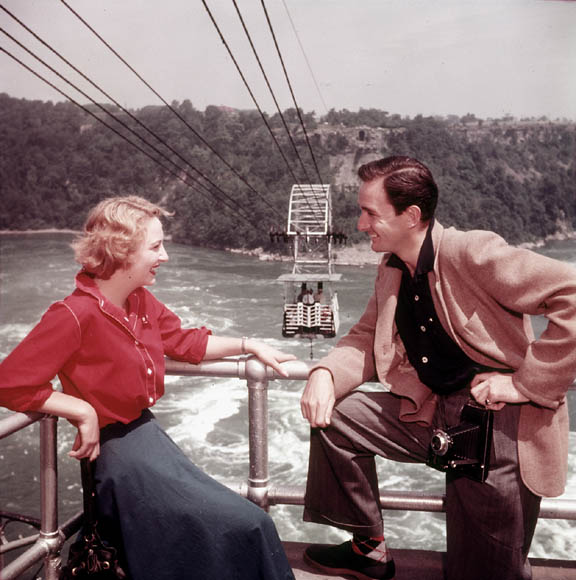
Sightseers at Niagara Gorge, with Aero Car in distance, c. 1960

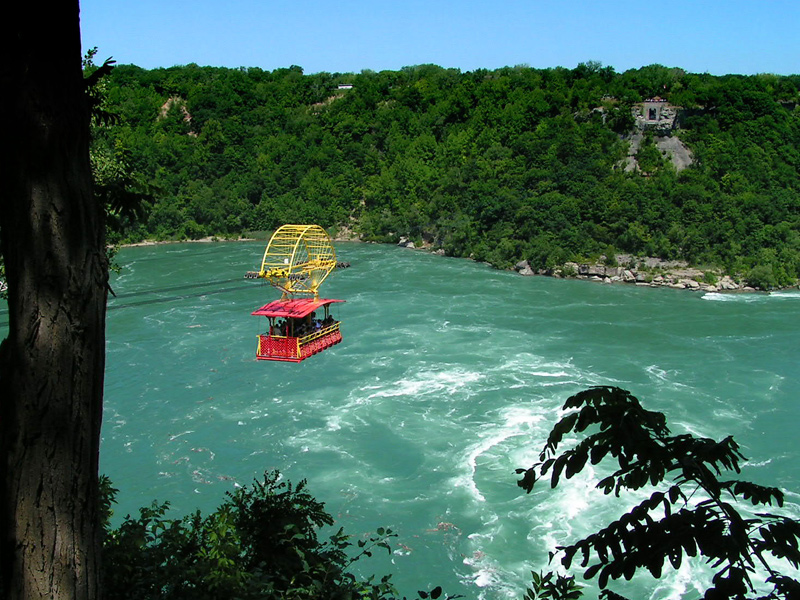
Whirlpool and Aero Car

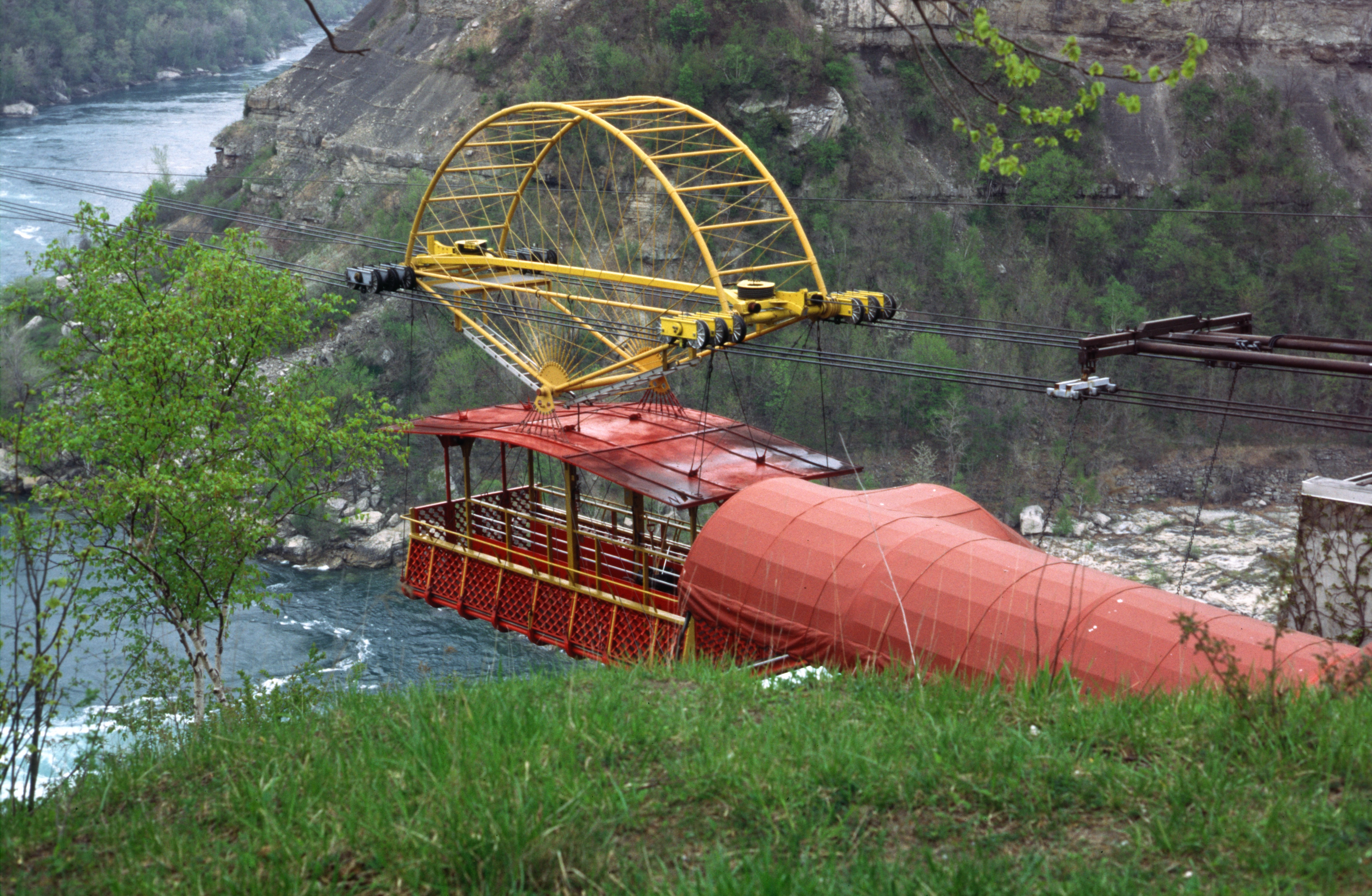
View of New York State behind Aero Car

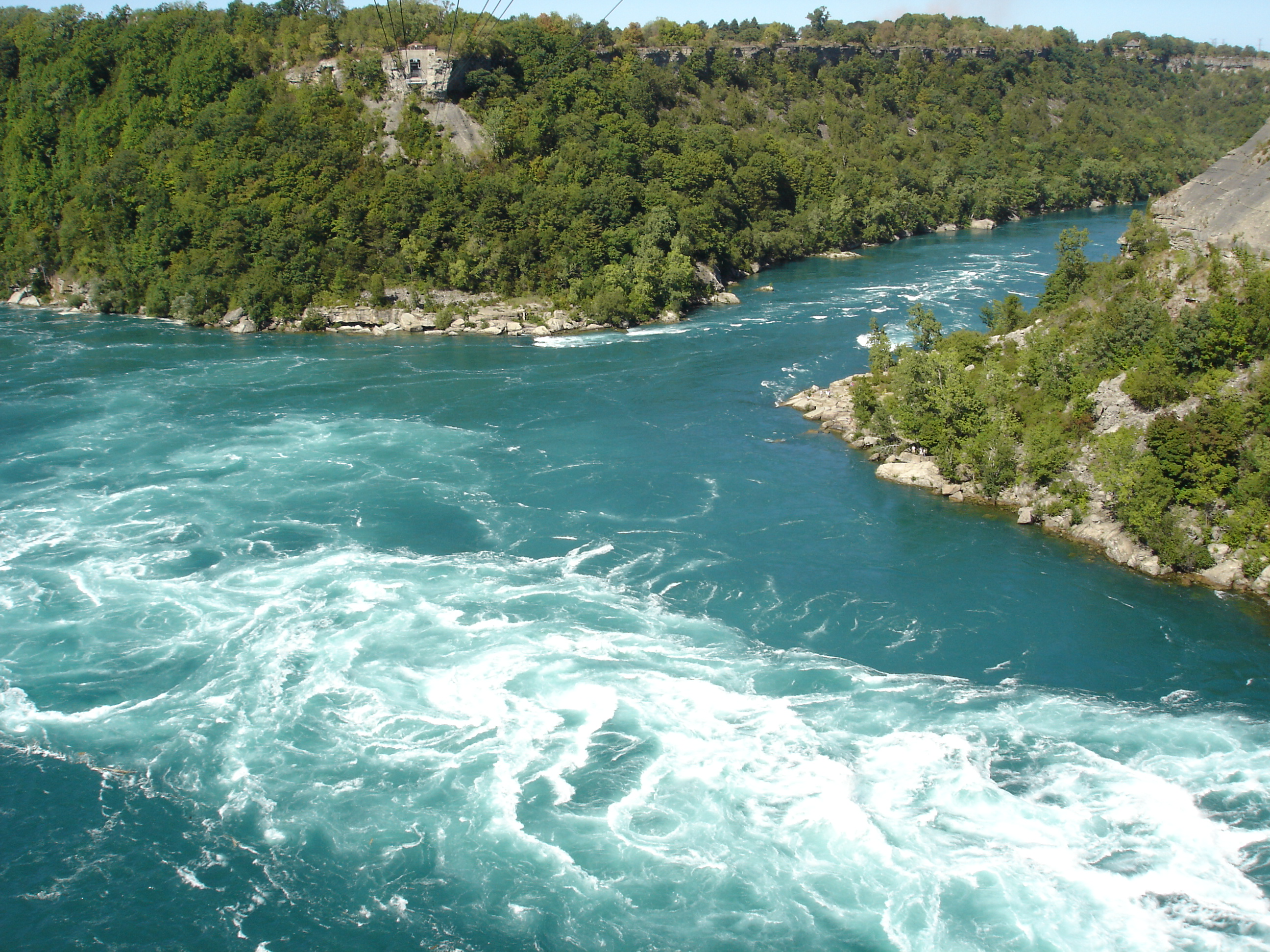
Whirlpool Rapids viewed from the Aero Car

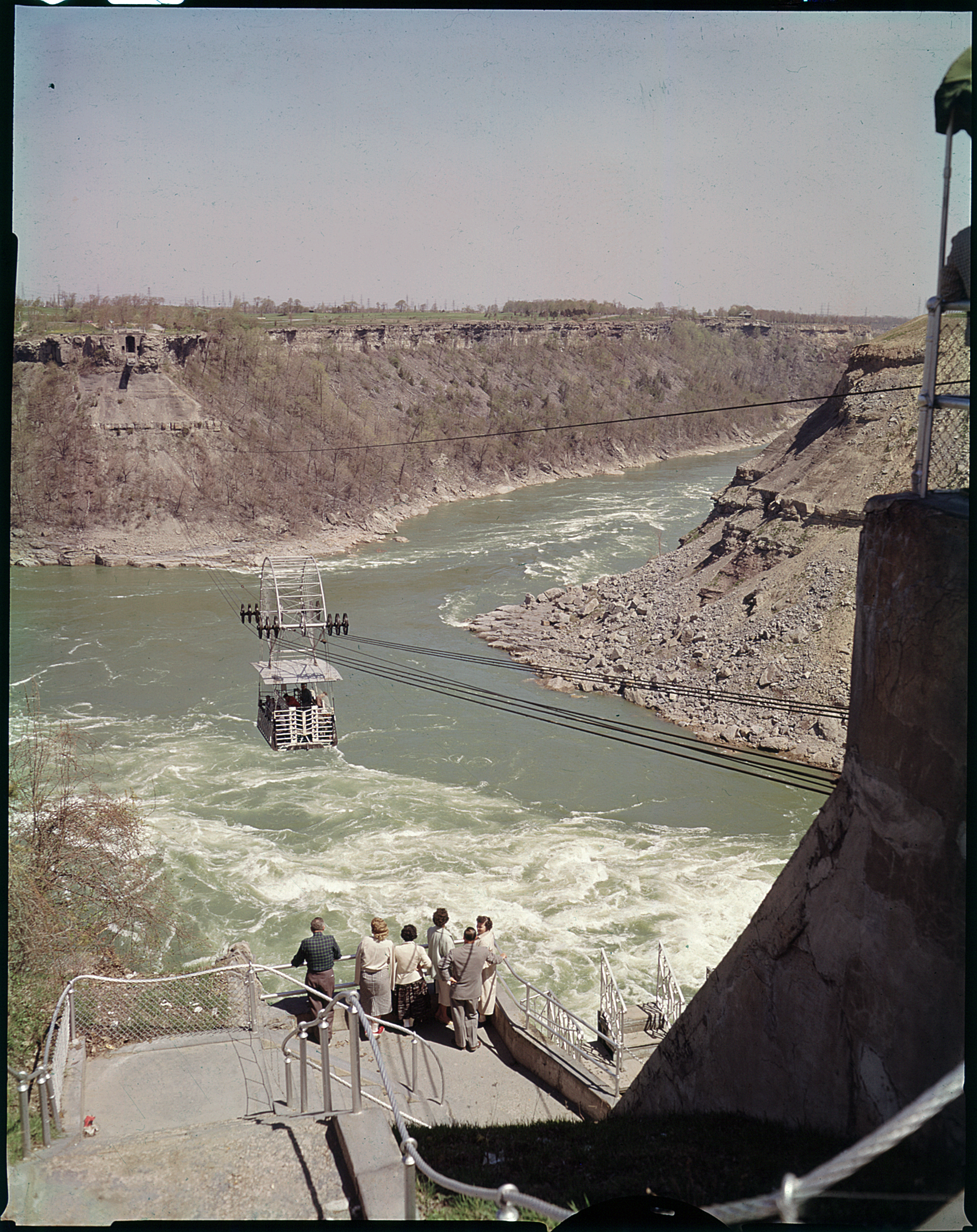
Cable car crossing the Niagara Whirlpool, 1959

== See also ==
- Incline railways at Niagara Falls
- Niagara Parks Commission People Mover
- Niagara Whirlpool
