= Ontario Alliance of Climbers =

Organization in Ontario, Canada

Ontario Alliance of Climbers (OAC)
- Type: Local Climbing Organization
- Founded: 2009
- Headquarters: Ontario, Canada
- Members: ~2600
- Website: https://www.ontarioallianceofclimbers.ca/

The Ontario Alliance of Climbers (OAC, formally known as Ontario Access Coalition) is an independent, provincial, volunteer, non-profit organization that works to keep climbing and bouldering areas open in Ontario, Canada. The organization's stated purpose is to help conserve access to climbing by advocating protection for the climbing environment, by resolving access issues as they arise, and by proactively engaging with and educating the climbing community.

== Organization ==
The OAC represents approximately 2,600 members and maintains deep relationships with climbing gyms, outdoor retailers, land managers and government bodies across Ontario.

In 2009, the OAC (then known as the Ontario Access Coalition) incorporated as a non-profit organization as a result of a grant from Mountain Equipment Co-op. Building from work completed by the Alpine Club of Canada's Toronto Chapter Access Committee in the 2000s, the OAC sought to further the goals of preserving access for Ontario climbers, stewarding wild spaces in Ontario whilst allowing for rock climbing to continue in a sustainable way.

In 2018, the Ontario Access Coalition rebranded as the Ontario Alliance of Climbers to better reflect its mission and members.

== Major Projects ==
The OAC worked jointly with the Niagara Parks Commission to secure climbing access in the Niagara Glen Nature Reserve in 2011. With significant demands on the region for recreation, the OAC and the commissioners developed a formal bouldering policy requiring climbing permits. The OAC continues to be an ambassador for the Niagara Glen, advocating for the preservation of sensitive vegetation and participating in research in pursuit of a greater understanding of the biodiversity of the region. Key to this research is exploring how rock climbing can coexist with conservation.

The OAC was integral in the purchase of land at the base of Old Baldy in Beaver Valley (Ontario) in 2014, working with the Mountain Equipment Coop, the Alpine Club of Canada, Ontario Climbing, Bruce Trail Conservancy and the Nature League

The OAC has spent considerable time securing and maintaining access to climbing areas on Niagara Escarpment and Bruce Peninsula. With a high concentration of limestone cliffs, the area offers significant recreational potential for climbers and hikers which must be balanced with the preservation of the natural environment. In 2010, the OAC secured continued access to Halfway Log Dump, a bouldering area on the shores of Georgian Bay. In 2017, the OAC negotiated continued access to rock climbing areas along the Niagara Escarpment via an amendment to the Niagara Escarpment Plan. In 2020, access issues resurfaced with the removal of fixed anchors and bolts at Lion's Head Provincial Park, which has highlighted the need to balance land management with climbing access

Recognizing the significant growth in outdoor climbers graduating from indoor climbing gyms, the OAC launched Gym-to-Crag and mentorship programs to mitigate the impact from new climbers on local climbing areas. Efforts to balance recreation with preservation have been recognized by land managers, with the OAC seeking to limit climbers' impact on the environment

The OAC, with the support of Conservation Halton, launched the Rattlesnake Bolting Project in 2018 to develop new routes and retrobolt existing unsafe traditional routes.

The OAC has been a regular sponsor of the Southern Ontario Ice Climbing Festival (SOIceFest), an annual event in Maynooth, Ontario. The event brings together ice climbers across the province for educational courses, climbing and community in support of local charities. The festival has also been supported by the Alpine Club of Canada, Mountain Equipment Coop, Arc’teryx, the Association of Canadian Mountain Guides, and Yamnuska Mountain Adventures, as well as local businesses in Maynooth.
