= Niagara Whirlpool =

Natural whirlpool in the Niagara Gorge, downstream from Niagara Falls

The Niagara Whirlpool
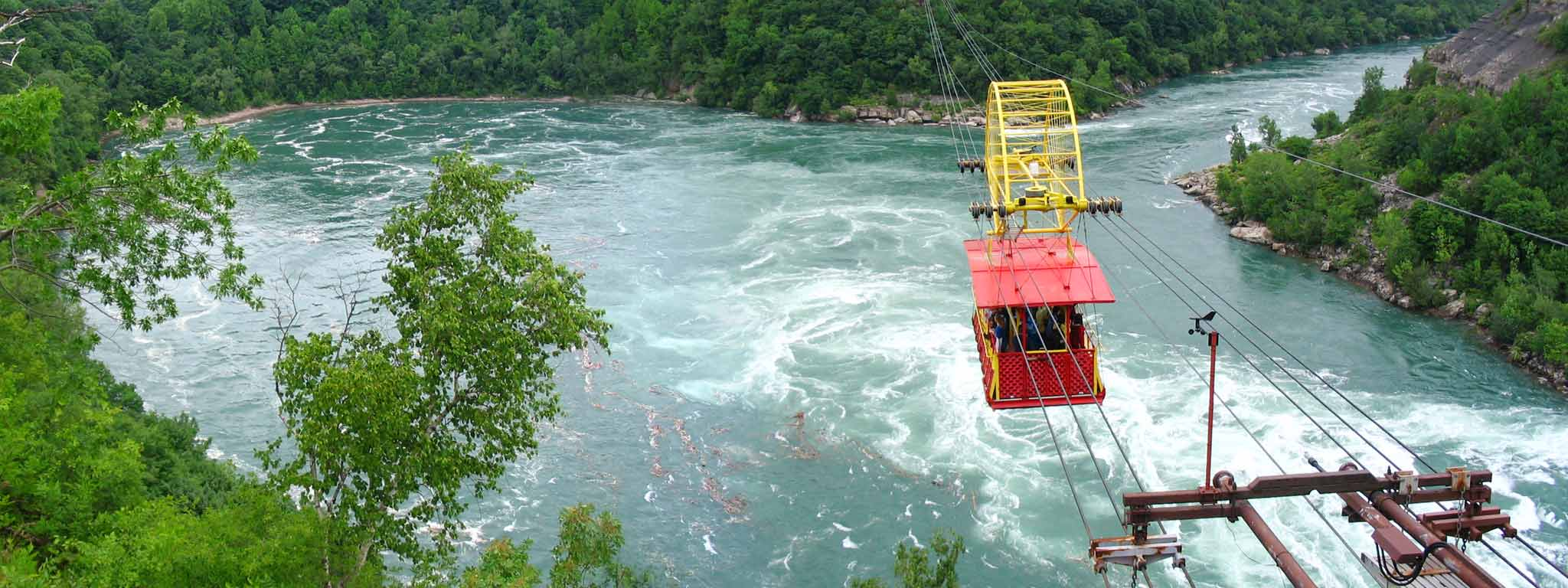
- Niagara Whirlpool with approaching Whirlpool Aero Car viewed from the south station

- Location within Ontario
- Location: North of the cities of Niagara Falls, ON and Niagara Falls, NY
- Coordinates: 43°07′15″N 79°04′12″W
- Average depth: 125 feet (38 m)

The Niagara Whirlpool is a natural whirlpool within the Niagara River located along the Canada–U.S. border between New York and Ontario. The whirlpool is in the Niagara Gorge, downstream from Niagara Falls. The whirlpool's greatest depth is 125 feet (38 m).

Whirlpool State Park is located on the United States side of the whirlpool, and Niagara Glen Nature Reserve is located on the Canadian side.

== Formation ==
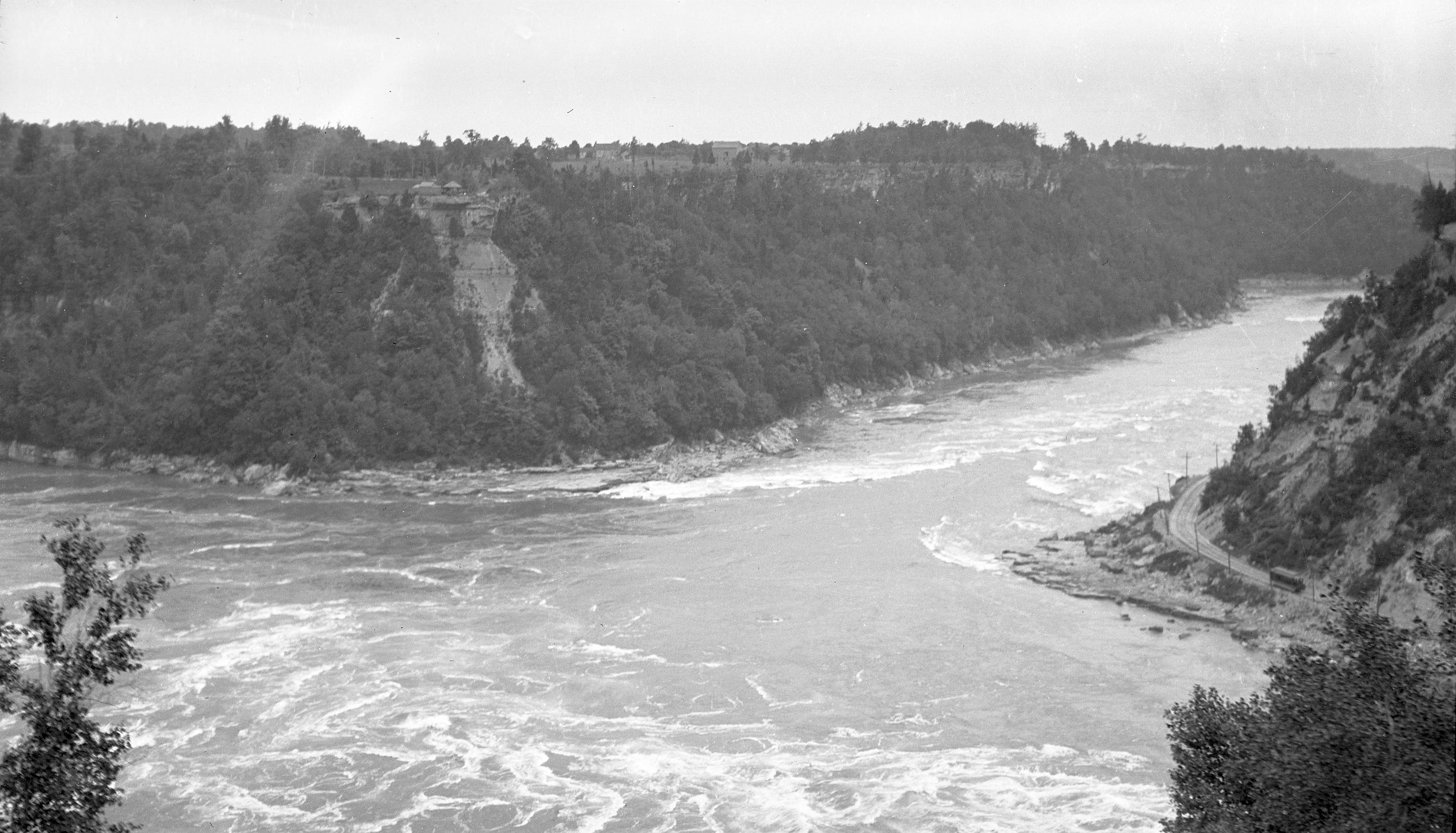
Whirlpool viewed from Canadian side, with Niagara Gorge Railroad visible in bottom right, 1911

It is estimated that the whirlpool formed approximately 4,200 years ago by the upstream erosion of the Niagara Escarpment by the Niagara River. Niagara Falls is located along the boundary of the Niagara Escarpment and has been retreating upstream since its formation. During this normally slow process, the retreating falls intersected with an ancient pre-glacial river bed inside Saint David's Buried Gorge. During the retreat of ice from the Wisconsin glaciation of the Last Glacial Period, the gorge was filled with loose sediment and rock. When the falls intersected with this buried gorge, the river quickly washed away the filled-in silt and rocks. The ancient buried gorge was nearly perpendicular to the Niagara River. This sharp and sudden change in direction of water flow, coupled with the rapid flow of water exiting the Niagara Gorge (speeds as high as 30 feet per second (9.1 m/s)), resulted in turbulent swirling of the river. Further erosion of the harder rock has resulted in a rounded basin that extends just to the side of the actual river's course.

The whirlpool naturally spins in a counterclockwise motion during normal flow. When more water from the river is diverted to the surrounding hydroelectric power plants, however, the whirlpool direction often reverses.

== Nearby attractions ==
On the United States side of the whirlpool is Whirlpool State Park; on the Canadian side is Niagara Glen Nature Reserve. The Whirlpool Aero Car, which traverses the river above the whirlpool, travels between two points on the Canadian side, and briefly enters U.S. territory four times during the trip.

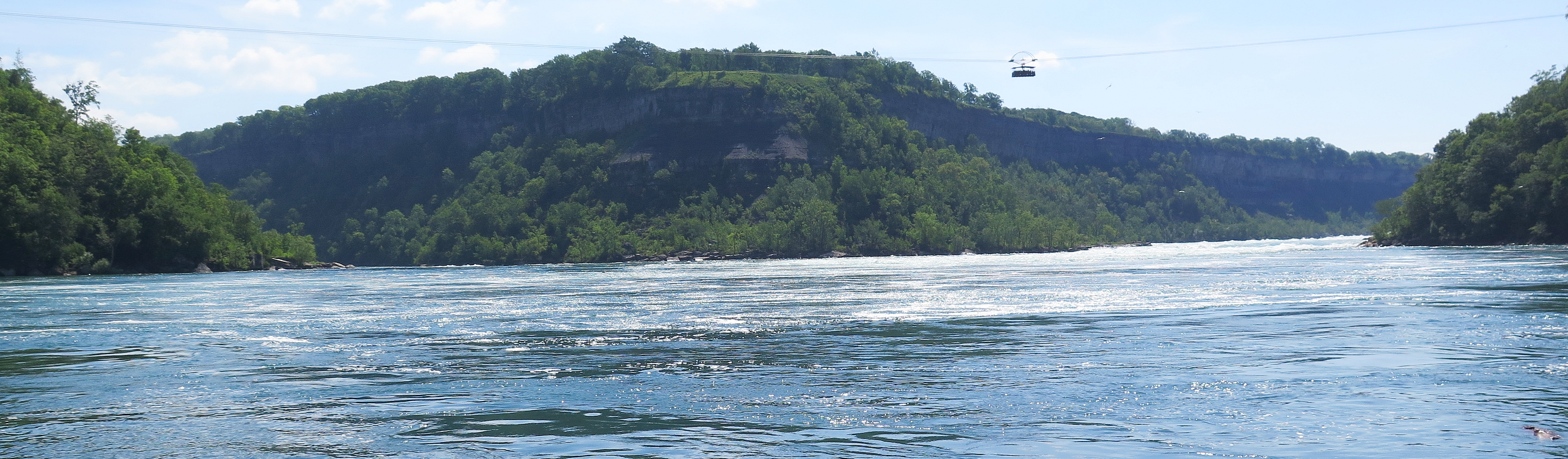
Niagara Whirlpool
