= Saint David's Buried Gorge =

Ancient pre-glacial river bed

Coordinates: 43.150°N 79.098°W

Saint David's Buried Gorge is an ancient pre-glacial river bed that existed 22,800 years ago on the present-day Niagara Peninsula. The ancient Saint David's River once flowed through this area prior to the advance of the Wisconsin glaciation during the Last Glacial Period. When the glacier retreated 12,000 years ago, the gorge and river valley were filled in with glacial silt and rocks. Approximately 4,200 years ago, the Niagara River intersected the buried gorge in the course of Niagara Falls receding toward Lake Erie. When the river encountered the glacial silt that filled the gorge, the river rapidly changed course to fill the ancient gorge and wash out most of the silt. This led to the formation of the Niagara Whirlpool. The Niagara River reclaimed the gorge and currently flows through part of the ancient gorge. The other part of the ancient gorge extends into Lake Ontario at a different point than the Niagara River. The gorge is estimated to be 4,000 ft (1,200 m) long, 1,000 ft (300 m) wide, and 300 ft (91 m) deep.

In the 1950s, Ontario Hydro dug two tunnels from the upper Niagara River to supply water to the Sir Adam Beck Hydroelectric Plant. These tunnels had to surface when they encountered the St. David's Gorge, as the loose silt in it was unsuitable for tunneling. In 2013, an additional tunnel, the Niagara Tunnel Project, was completed. This tunnel was bored beneath the old gorge to avoid the unsuitable geology.
