= Incline railways at Niagara Falls =

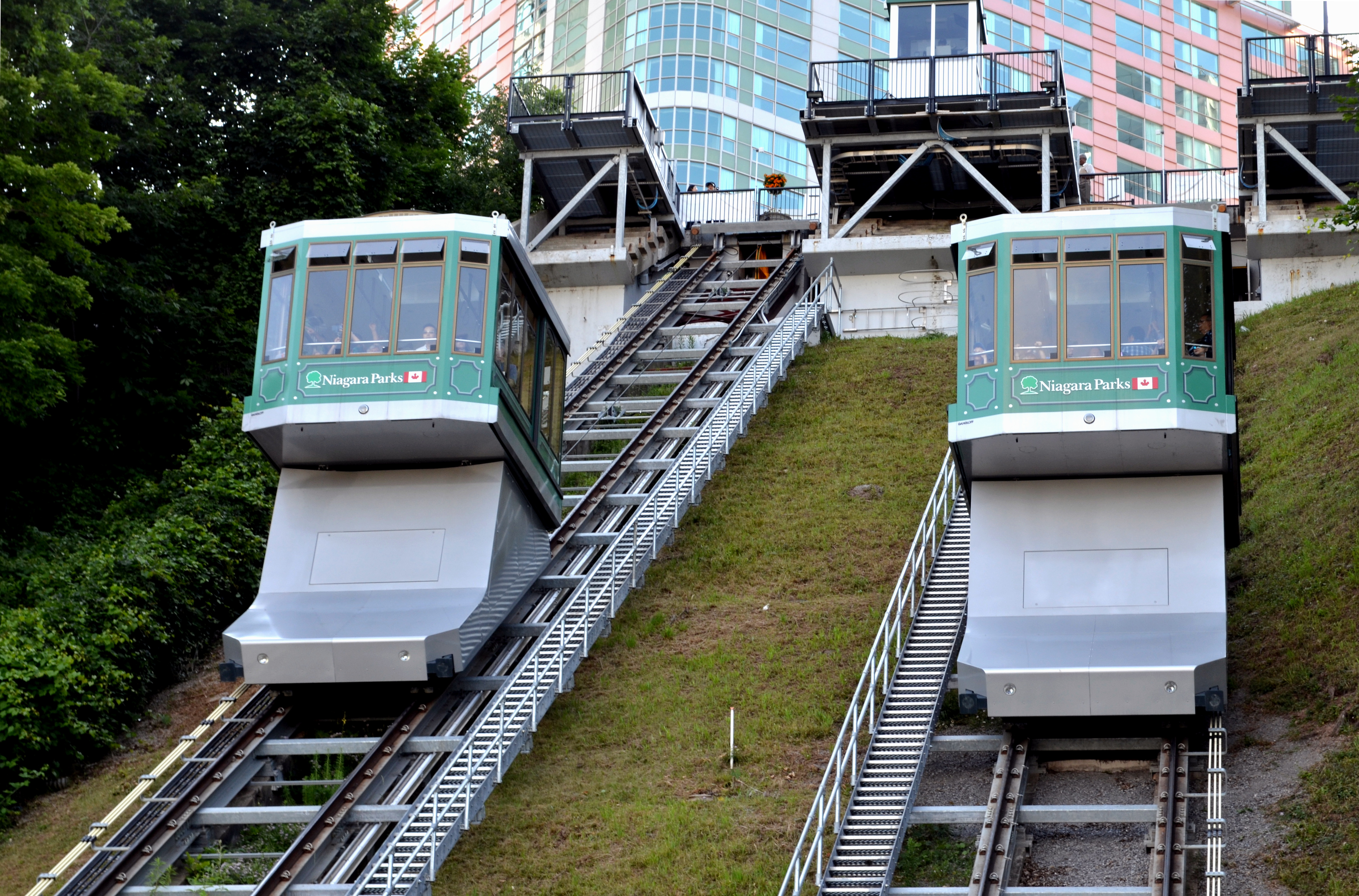
The Falls Incline Railway

There have been several different incline railways built near Niagara Falls, on opposite sides of the river between Canada and the United States.

These lines include:

- The Prospect Park Incline Railway was built in 1845 on the United States side of the falls at Prospect Point. An accident in 1907 claimed a single life and led to the closure of this ride. The entire ride was removed in 1908 and replaced with an elevator in 1910. In 1960 the elevator was closed and replaced with the current Prospect Point Observation Tower in 1961.
- The Leander Colt Incline was built on the Canadian side of the falls in 1869 near the Whirlpool Rapids Bridge. The incline railway was damaged in 1889 and abandoned.
- The Whirlpool Rapids Incline appeared in 1876 near the Leander Colt site. It was damaged by a fire in 1934 and replaced with an elevator ride called Great Gorge Trip, which was in turn renamed the Great Gorge Adventure in 1989 and later the White Water Walk.
- The Clifton Incline was built to serve the Canadian boat dock of the Maid of the Mist in 1894. It was closed in 1976 and resumed operations as the Maid of the Mist Incline in 1977. It ceased operations in 1990, but reopened as the Hornblower Niagara Funicular in 2019.
- The Falls Incline Railway, originally known as the Horseshoe Falls Incline, was built on the Canadian side of the Horseshoe Falls in 1966. It was in operation until 2012 and replaced with a new railway commencing operation in August 2013.

== See also ==
- List of funicular railways
- Niagara Parks Commission People Mover
- Spanish Aerocar
