= Prospect Point Observation Tower =

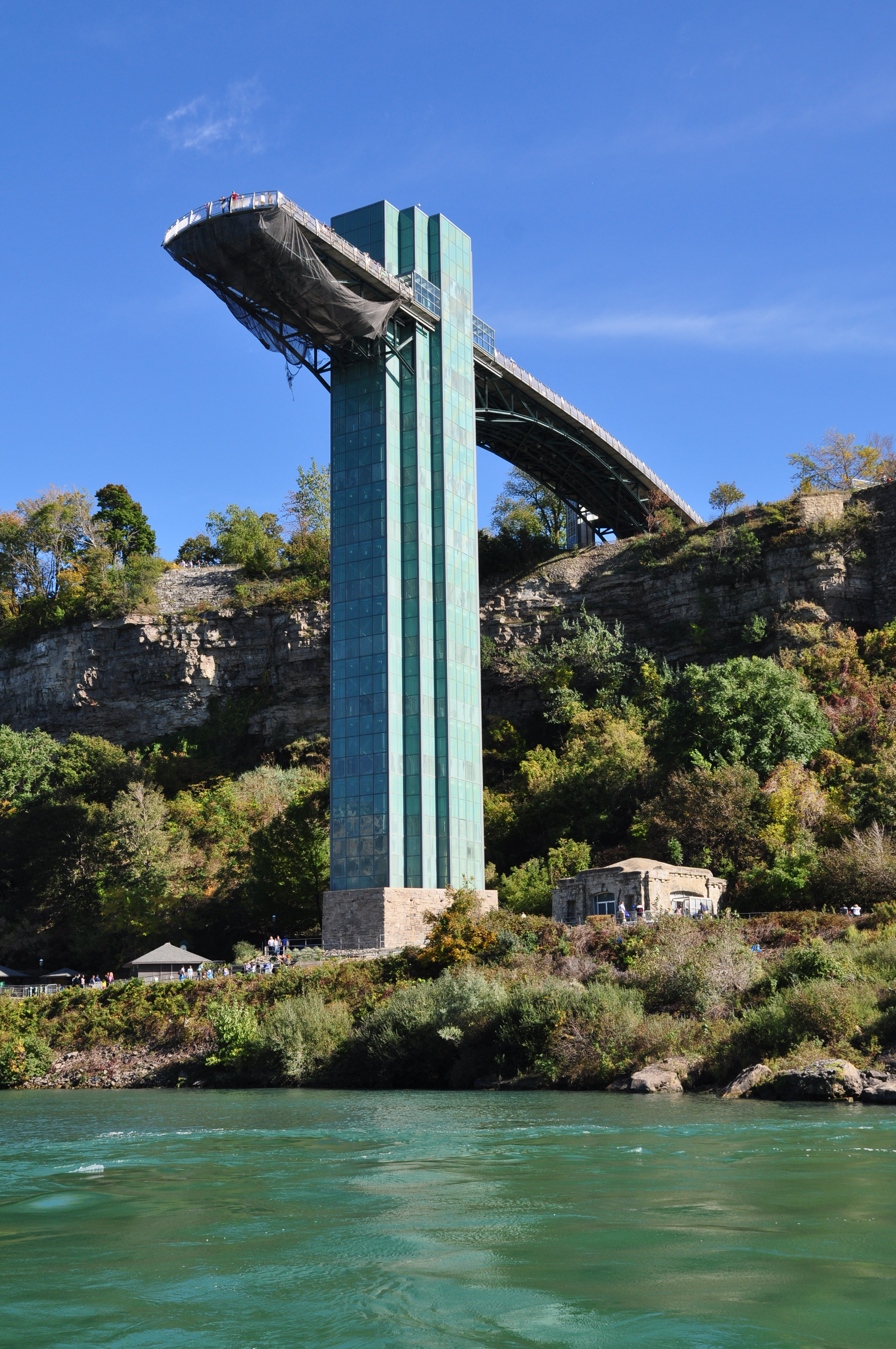
- The observation tower in 2013
- Interactive map of the Prospect Point Observation Tower area

General information
- Architectural style: Modernist
- Location: Niagara Falls, New York, United States of America
- Coordinates: 43.086442°N 79.068389°W
- Construction started: 1958
- Completed: 1961
- Renovated: 2001
- Cost: US$1,250,000

Height
- Height: 282 feet (86 m)

Technical details
- Lifts/elevators: 4

Website
- http://www.niagarafallsstatepark.com/observation-tower.aspx

The Prospect Point Observation Tower (also known as the Niagara Falls Observation Tower) is a tower in Niagara Falls, New York, United States just east of the American Falls.

== History ==
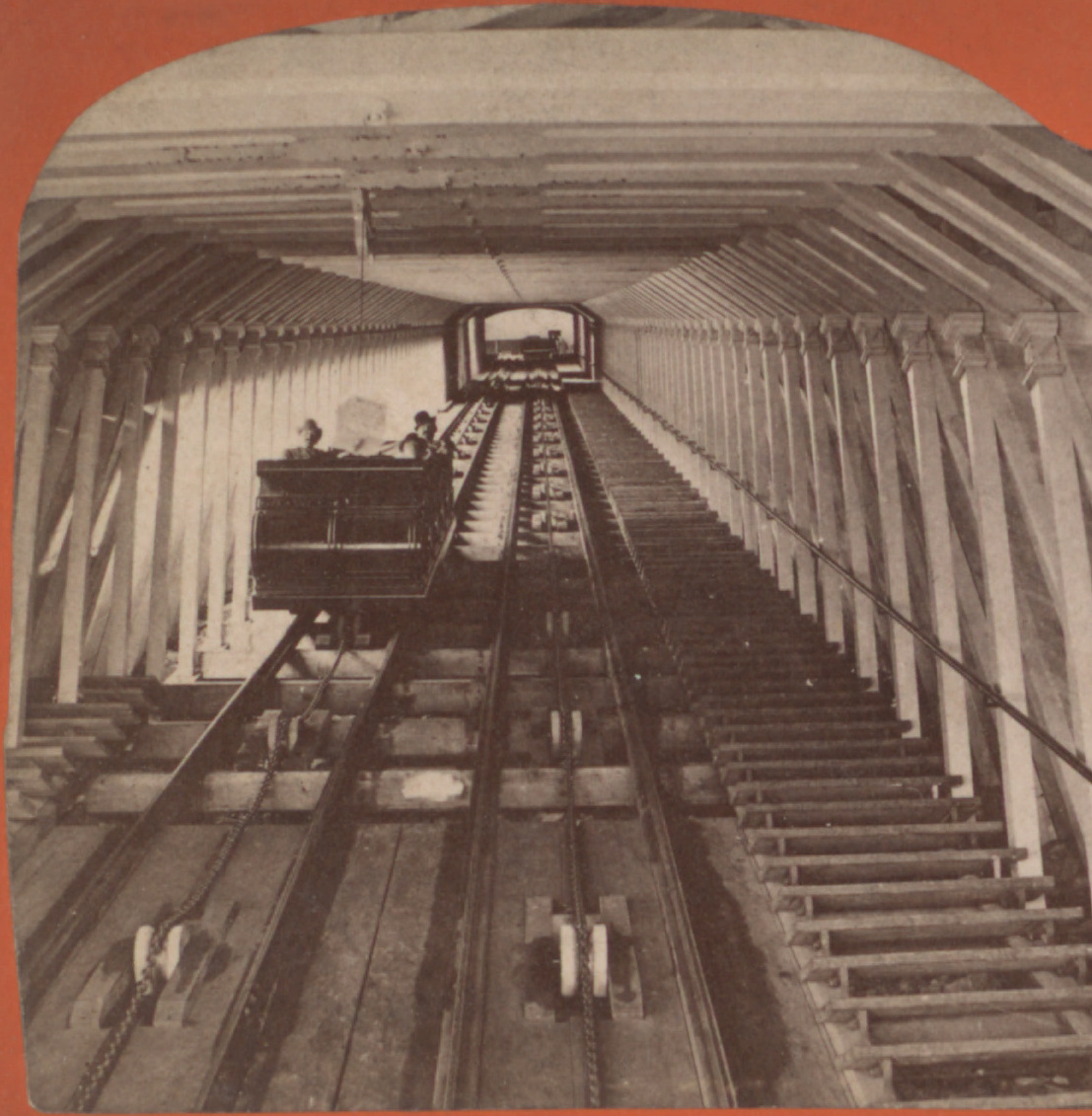
The Prospect Point Incline Railway

The area of the tower and Prospect Point was once known as the High Bank Industrial/Mill District, and hosted industrial use of the area from the 1870s to 1940s.

The tower was originally built in 1961 and extensively refurbished between 2001 and 2003. Improvements included a pre-cast concrete plank observation deck, an ornamental stainless steel deck railing system, improved high-speed elevators, new rest rooms, and a gift shop.

== Description ==
The tower, constructed of aluminum, glass, and steel, stands at 282 feet (86 m) with the base at the bottom of the gorge. Visitors enter the tower at the ground level from Niagara Falls State Park. It sees eight million visitors annually.

The Maid of the Mist loads at the base of the tower.
