= Niagara Gorge =

Canyon on the border between New York, USA and Ontario, Canada

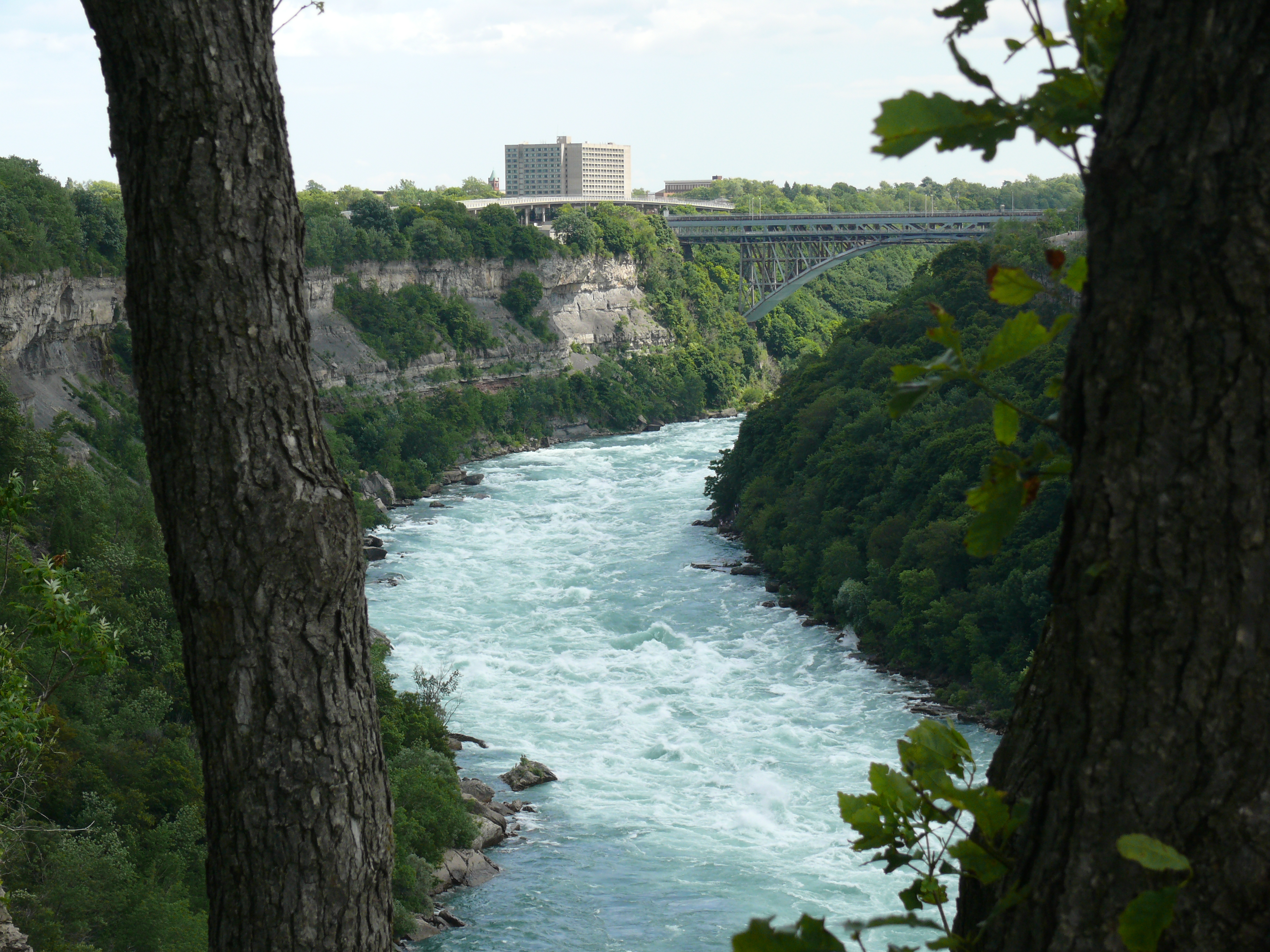
- Niagara River flowing through Niagara Gorge (from eastern brink north of Niagara Whirlpool). The Whirlpool Rapids Bridge is visible in the background.

Geography
- Location: New York, USA and Ontario, Canada
- Coordinates: 43°07′15″N 79°04′14″W
- Interactive map of Niagara Gorge

Niagara Gorge is an 11-kilometre-long (6.8-mile) canyon carved by the Niagara River along the Canada–United States border, between the U.S. state of New York and the Canadian province of Ontario. It begins at the base of Niagara Falls and ends downriver at the edge of the geological formation known as the Niagara Escarpment near Queenston, Ontario, where the falls originated about 12,500 years ago. The position of the falls has receded upstream toward Lake Erie because of the falling waters' slow erosion of the riverbed's hard Lockport dolomite (a form of limestone that is the surface rock of the escarpment), combined with rapid erosion of the relatively soft layers beneath it. This erosion has created the gorge.

The force of the river current in the gorge is one of the most powerful in the world; because of the dangers this presents, kayaking the gorge has generally been prohibited. On multiple occasions, the rapids of the gorge have claimed the lives of people attempting to run them. However, on isolated occasions, world-class experts have been permitted to navigate the stretch. Tourists can traverse the rapids of the Niagara Gorge on commercial tours in rugged jetboats, which are based at Niagara-on-the-Lake, Ontario, at Lewiston, New York, at Youngstown, New York, and in midsummer at Niagara Glen Nature Centre on the Niagara Parkway in Ontario.

Matthew Webb, the first person to swim the English Channel, drowned trying to swim the rapids of the gorge as part of a publicity stunt in 1883.

== Image gallery ==
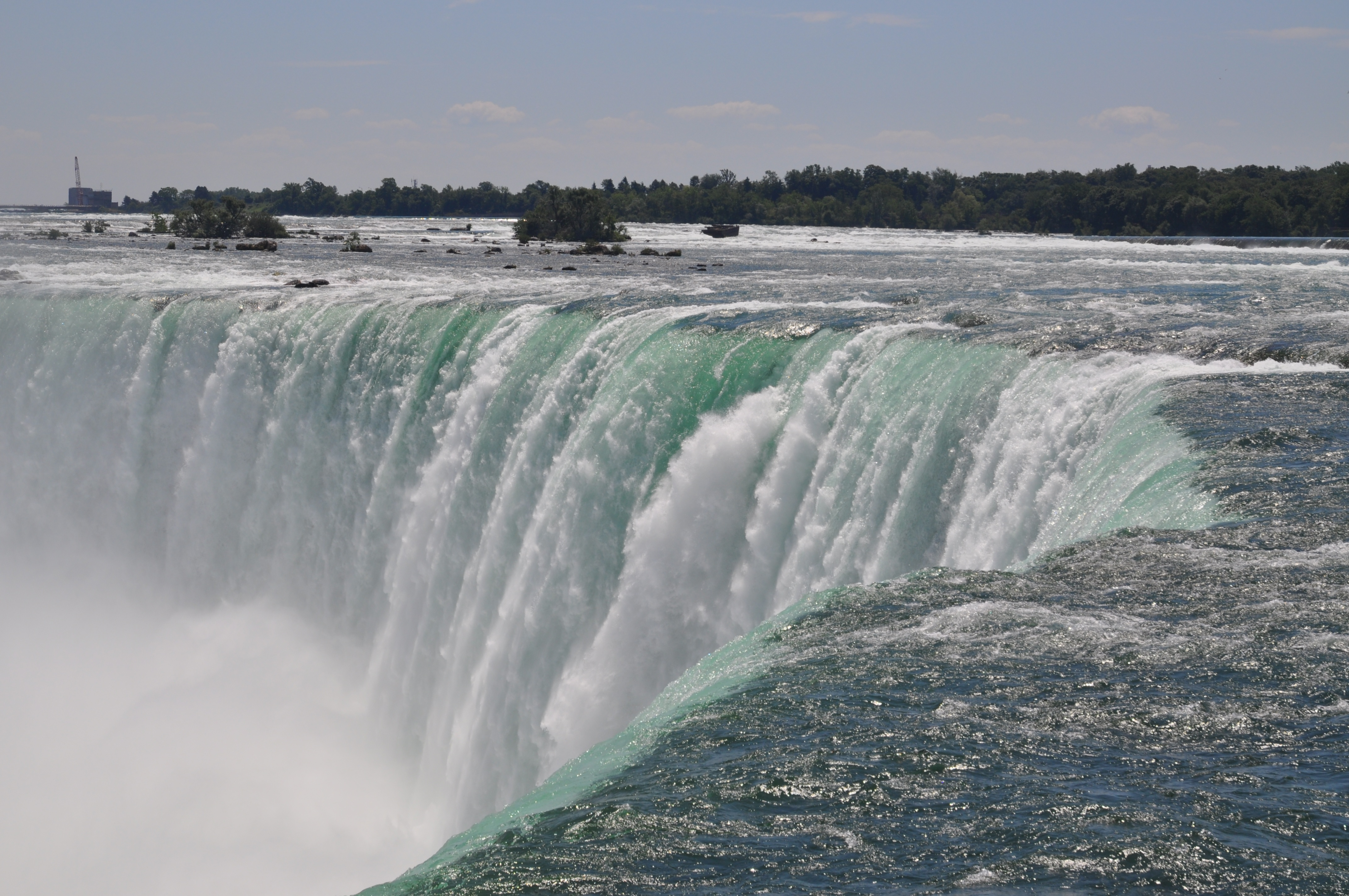
The Niagara River flows into the gorge at the falls and over thousands of years carves the gorge through the Niagara Escarpment

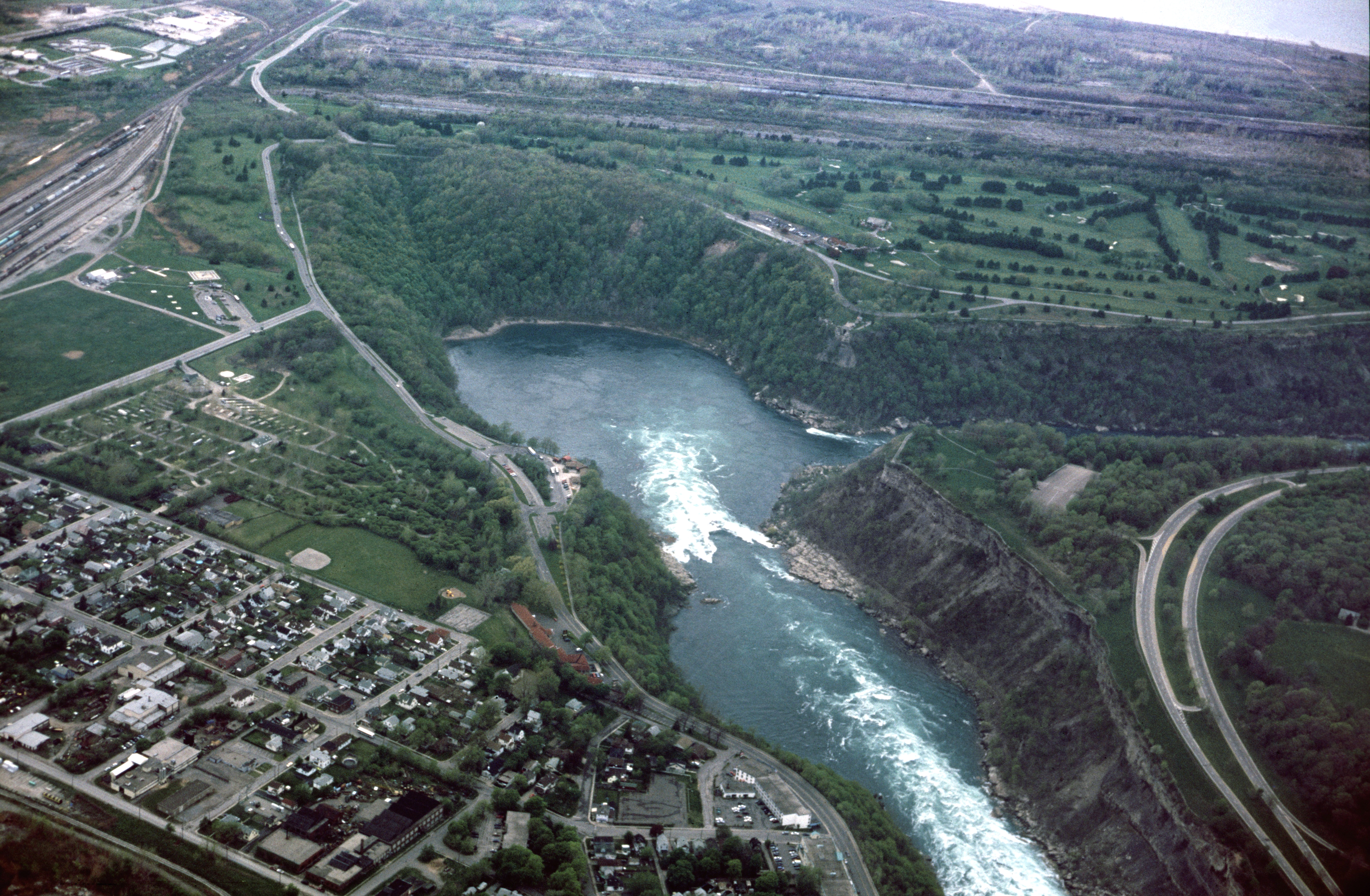
The Niagara River whirlpool basin in Niagara Gorge.

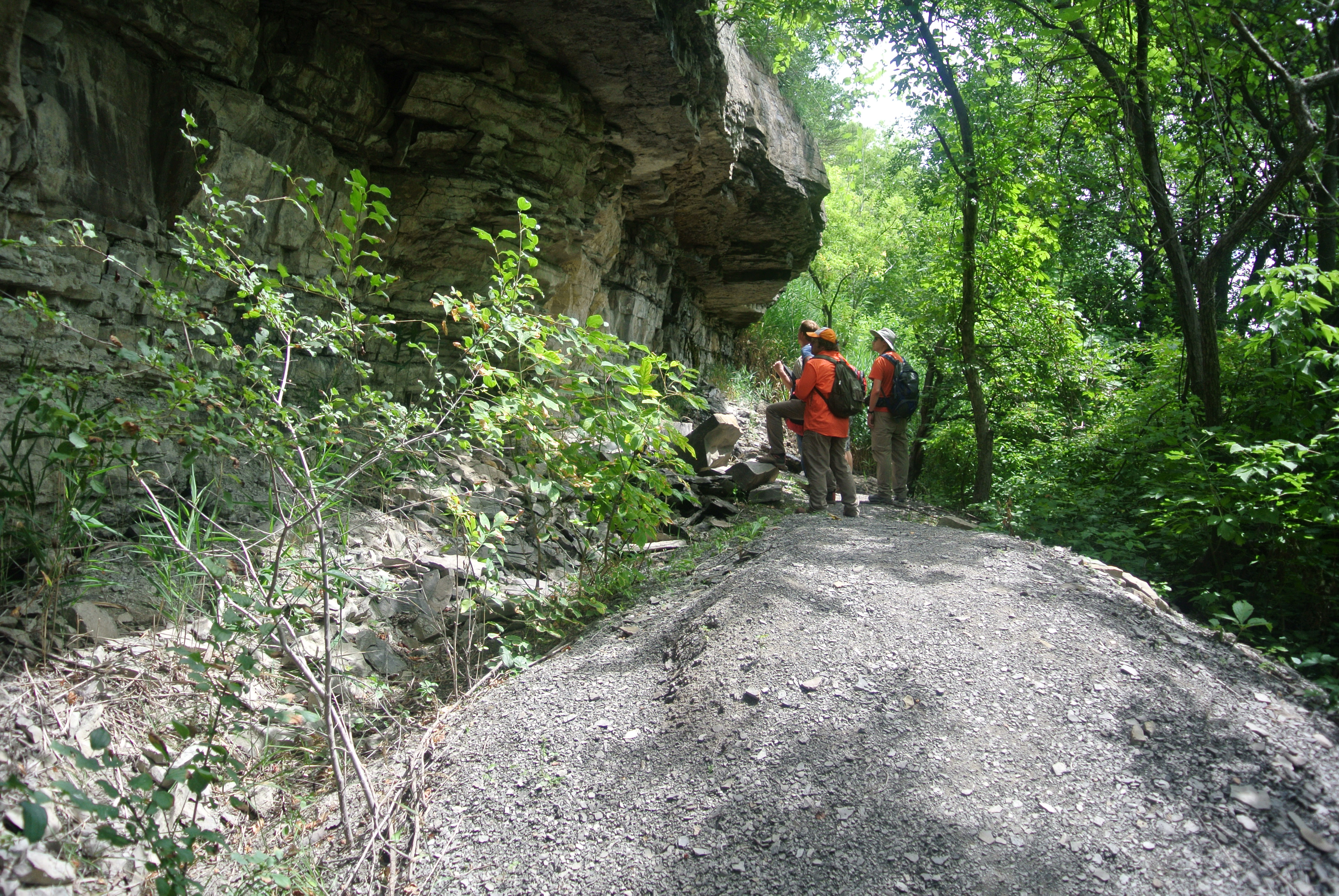
Niagara Gorge trail near the Lewiston-Queenston Bridge.

== See also ==
- Niagara Whirlpool
- Whirlpool Rapids Incline
