= Times Square Hotel =

Apartment building in Manhattan, New York

- U.S. National Register of Historic Places
- New York State Register of Historic Places
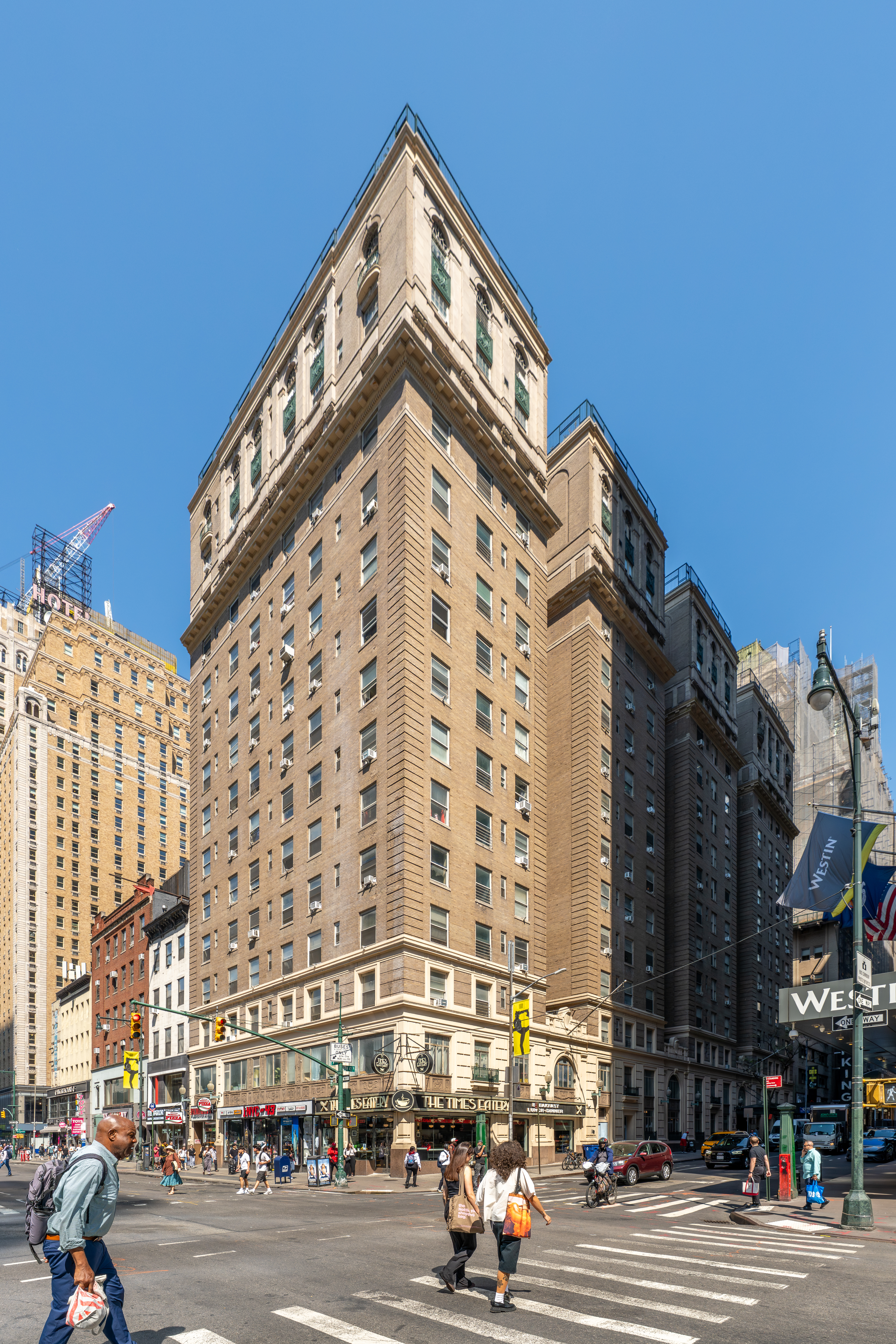
- Seen in 2026

- Location within New York City Location within New York Location within the United States
- Location: 255 West 43rd Street, New York City, U.S.
- Coordinates: 40°45′28″N 73°59′19″W
- Area: 17,574 ft^{2} (1,632.7 m^{2})
- Built: 1922
- Architects: Gronenberg & Leuchtag
- Architectural style: Renaissance
- NRHP reference No.: 95000530
- NYSRHP No.: 06101.006973

Significant dates
- Added to NRHP: May 4, 1995
- Designated NYSRHP: March 9, 1995

The Times Square Hotel is an apartment building and former hotel at 255 West 43rd Street, near Times Square, in the Midtown Manhattan neighborhood of New York City, New York, U.S. Completed in 1923, the 15-story building was designed in the Renaissance Revival style by the firm of Gronenberg & Leuchtag; it is the firm's only hotel design. Since 1991, it has served as a supportive housing shelter operated by the nonprofit organization Breaking Ground (formerly Common Ground). The hotel is listed on the National Register of Historic Places.

The facade is divided vertically into multiple bays facing Eighth Avenue to the west and 43rd Street to the south. The first two stories of the facade are clad in white limestone, while the other stories are clad in tan brick with terracotta decorations. Above the first two stories, three light courts on the southern facade divide the hotel into four wings. Originally, the hotel had a dozen storefronts in addition to offices, lounging rooms, and reading rooms. Rooms in the wings extended southward from a "spine" near the north side of the building. The lobby was the only major public room that remained intact by the 1990s. When the hotel was built, it contained 875 bedrooms, but since the 1990s, it has contained 652 units of supportive housing.

The structure was developed by Henry Claman, who had planned to build a movie theater there before deciding to construct a hotel for single men. The hotel was completed in April 1923 as the Claman Hotel and was sold less than a year later to Manger Hotels, who changed the name to the Times Square Hotel. The Manger family sold the Times Square Hotel in 1931, and the grill room became a popular venue for musical performances in the 1940s. The hotel was sold again in 1956, and a partnership headed by Arthur Schwebel leased it in 1962, renovating it into the Times Square Motor Hotel. The hotel was rundown by the 1980s, and nonprofit organization Covenant House bought the hotel in 1984, converting three stories into corporate offices and operating the other stories as a single room occupancy facility. The hotel was sold again in 1987, but the owners soon went into bankruptcy protection, and Tran Dinh Truong took over in 1988. The building was used to shelter homeless families while continuing to deteriorate. Common Ground acquired the hotel in 1991 and renovated it over the next three years.

== Site ==
The Times Square Hotel is at 255 West 43rd Street, on the northeast corner with Eighth Avenue, near Times Square in the Theater District of Midtown Manhattan in New York City. The land lot is nearly rectangular and covers 17,574 square feet (1,632.7 m^{2}), with a frontage of 75.25 feet (22.94 m) on Eighth Avenue and 200 ft (61 m) on 43rd Street. The block of 43rd Street outside the building is co-named in honor of Adolph Ochs, a former publisher of The New York Times, the longtime occupant of the neighboring 229 West 43rd Street.

The surrounding area is part of Manhattan's Theater District and contains many Broadway theatres. 255 West 43rd Street shares the city block with St. James Theatre, the Hayes Theater, and Sardi's restaurant to the northeast on 44th Street, as well as 1501 Broadway and 229 West 43rd Street to the east on 43rd Street. Across 44th Street are the Majestic, Broadhurst, and Shubert theaters to the northeast, as well as the Row NYC Hotel to the north. The Todd Haimes Theatre, Lyric Theatre, Times Square Theatre, and New Victory Theater are across 43rd Street to the southeast, while the Hotel Carter and the E-Walk are immediately to the south. The hotel is also surrounded by various other apartment, office, industrial, and commercial buildings. Prior to the Times Square Hotel's development, the abutting block of 43rd Street had contained wood-frame houses, many of which were occupied by physicians; as such, the street was nicknamed "Doctor's Row".

== Architecture ==
The Times Square Hotel was designed in a Renaissance-inspired style. The firm of Gronenberg & Leuchtag, headed by Herman Gronenberg and Albert Leuchtag, drew up plans for the hotel, which was built by developer Henry Claman. The Times Square Hotel is the only hotel building that Gronenberg & Leuchtag are known to have designed. The structure is 15 stories high.

=== Facade ===
The first two stories are clad in rusticated blocks of white limestone, above a small granite water table, while the other stories are clad in tan brick with terracotta decorations. Above the first two stories, three light courts on the southern facade divide the hotel into four wings. On 43rd Street, each of the wings is further divided vertically into three bays, except the easternmost wing, which is divided into four bays.

==== 43rd Street ====
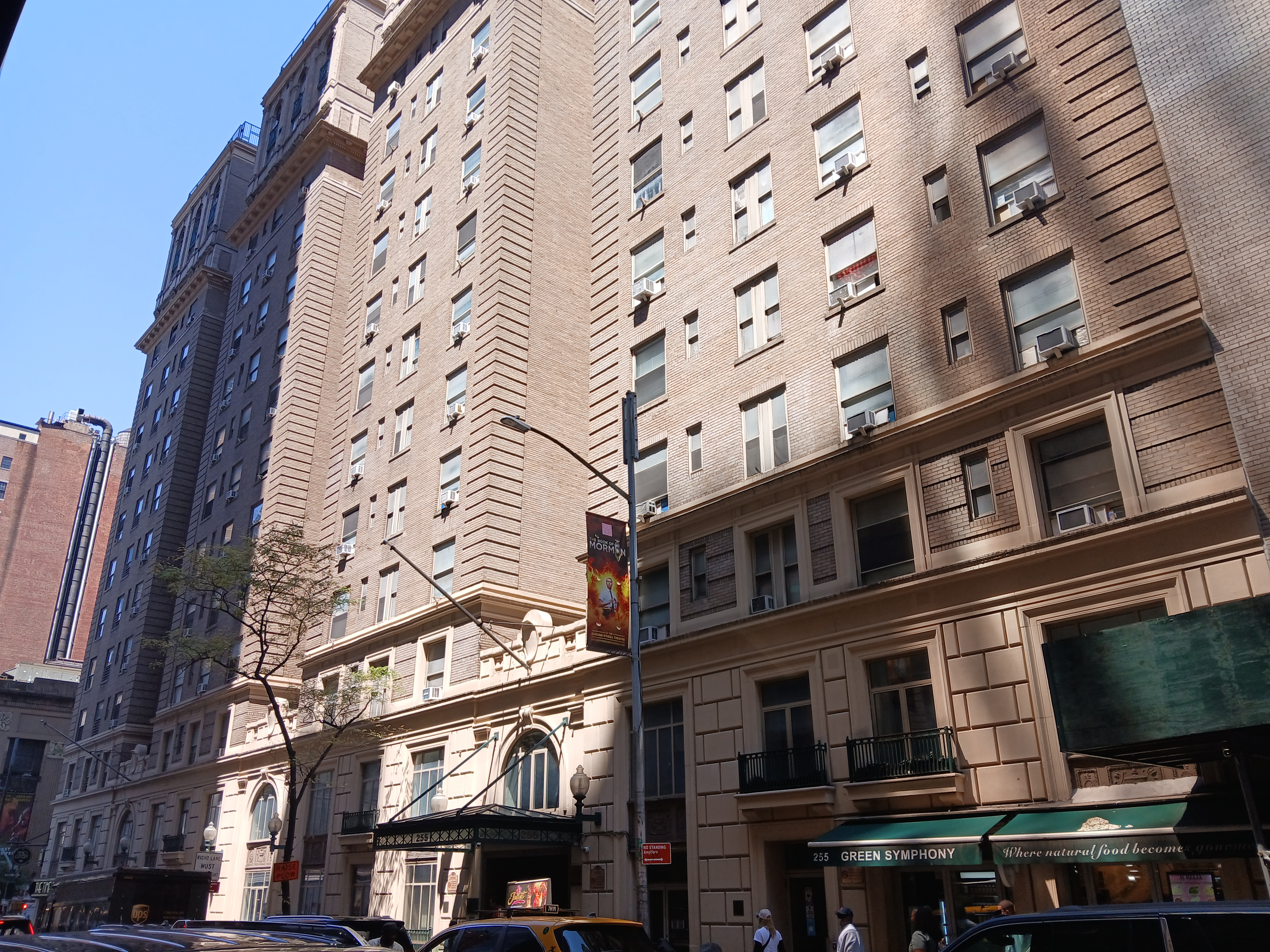
View from 43rd Street

On the first two stories, there is a round-arched window beneath each light court. All of these windows contain iron railings at the first story and are flanked by Doric-style pilasters, which support a balustrade with a central shield above the second story. The easternmost wing contains the main entrance, which leads to a recessed vestibule with a set of bronze entrance doors. The vestibule has terrazzo floors, a plaster ceiling, and granite walls; there is a bronze service door and a plaque to the left. East of the entrance was a service gate, as well as a granite storefront leading to the Headline Room, which was added in the early 1950s and removed in 1994. In each bay, there are Renaissance-style spandrel panels made of cast iron above the ground level, while the second floor contains metal casement windows. The other three wings contain similar ornamentation, although there are additional doors and storefronts at ground level. Additionally, at the second floor, the central bay of each wing contains a small balcony.

The 3rd story is designed as a transitional story and is clad in brick; some of the bricks are recessed, creating a pattern that resembles rustication. This story contains large windows that illuminate the residential units, interspersed with small windows that illuminate the bathrooms. There is a horizontal frieze just above the 3rd floor, as well as embossed geometric patterns above each of the larger windows. The window arrangement on the 4th through 15th stories is the same as on the 3rd story. The 4th through 11th floors constitute the hotel's midsection. On these stories, each window has sills and lintels made of terracotta, and each wing is flanked by embossed brick panels. A horizontal belt course, made of terracotta, runs above the 11th floor. There are terracotta panels at each corner of each large window, as well as a terracotta cornice running above the entire 12th story.

The 13rd through 15th stories comprise the top section of the facade and contain windows with terracotta frames. The window frames on the 13th story are flat, and the windows on that story are flanked by terracotta-framed brick panels. On the 14th and 15th stories, each bay has a Renaissance-style frame, which consists of console brackets that support Doric pilasters on either side of each bay. The rectangular windows on the 14th story and the arched windows on the 15th story are separated by metal spandrels with cartouches, and the 14th-story windows are topped by terracotta lintels with shields. In the two outer bays of the easternmost wing, the 15th-story windows contain terracotta balconies instead of spandrel panels. Above the 15th story is a terracotta cornice and a brick parapet.

==== Other elevations ====
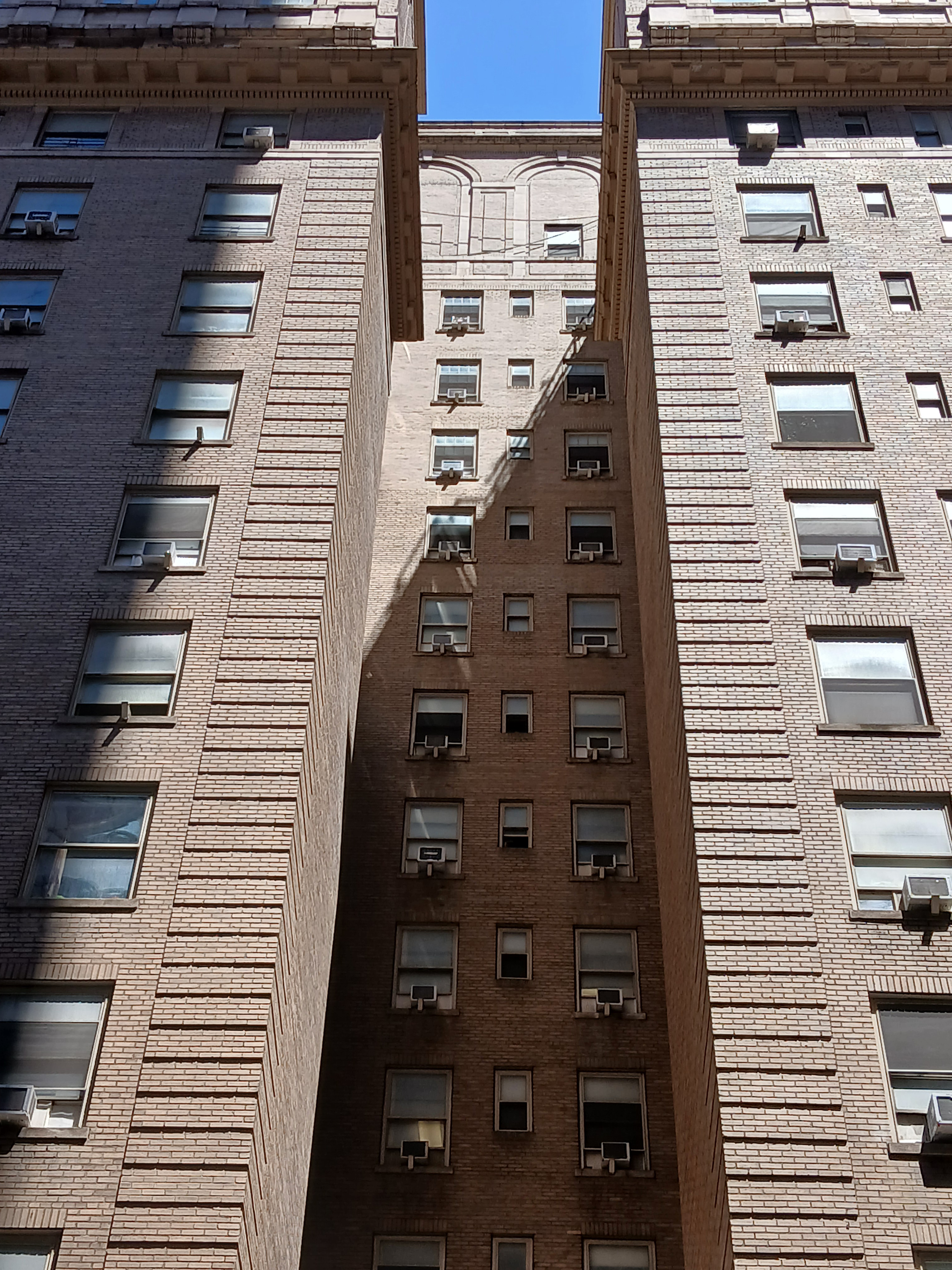
Light court detail

In each of the light courts on 43rd Street, the walls are clad with tan brick. The side walls generally do not contain windows, except at the far end of each light court, away from the street. Each light court's side wall is topped by a terracotta coping. The central light court also has a mechanical penthouse with terracotta blind arches. Additional light courts face east and north but are not visible from the street. The eastern and northern light courts are clad in plain brick without any other ornamentation.

The Eighth Avenue elevation is also divided horizontally into three sections. The base is flanked by rusticated limestone piers; there are stores on the first story and plate-glass windows on the second story. The center of the second floor contains a double window flanked by a single and a triple window. There are Renaissance-inspired spandrel panels beneath the second-story windows, similar to those on 43rd Street. On the remaining stories, there are six large windows and several smaller windows on each story; the facade is otherwise similar in arrangement to the 43rd Street elevation. On the 13th to 15th floors, the four center bays are placed within a projecting terracotta loggia and are designed similarly to the 43rd Street elevation, while the two outer bays include terracotta balconies on the 14th story.

=== Interior ===
The Times Square Hotel was constructed with twelve storefronts and four electric elevators. There were also offices, lounging rooms, and reading rooms. Service functions, such as elevators and stairs, were clustered along a "spine" near the north side of the building. The wings on 43rd Street, in turn, extend southward from the spine.

==== Public rooms ====
The lobby, covering 7,200 square feet (670 m^{2}), was the only major public room that remained intact by the 1990s. The lobby is a double-height, "L"-shaped space that extends to the north and west. The room contains a terrazzo floor with red-and-black decorations on a brown background, as well as pink marble walls with black-marble baseboards. On the eastern wall, two curved staircases with bronze railings lead up to a balcony with cast-iron railing, which in turn is supported by square piers with marble sheathing. The lobby also contains six octagonal piers, which are also sheathed in marble and support the main ceiling. Plasterwork decorations, such as rosettes and moldings, divide the ceiling into panels. There is a marble desk that wraps around the north and west corners of the lobby, as well as a partition to the northwest of the desk, which led to an office space. The west and south walls of the lobby contain windows, which lead respectively to a marble counter and another office. There are three elevators on the northern wall of the lobby's western section, as well as an emergency staircase to the west of these elevators.

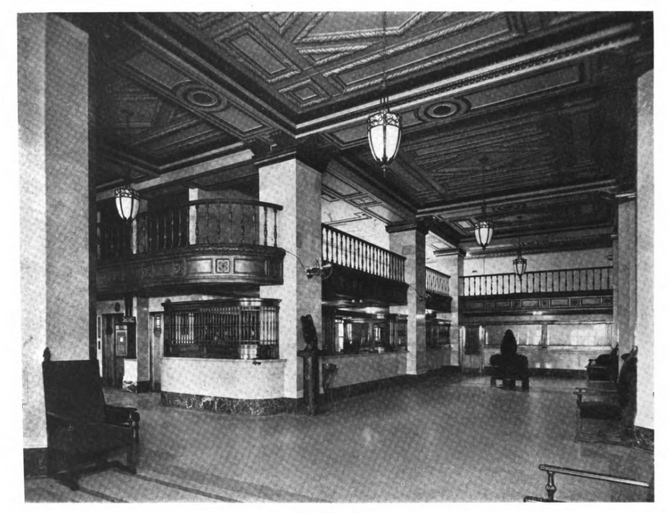
Original lobby

By the 1990s, the hotel's ground level was divided into four storefronts. The ground level also includes 10,000 square feet (930 m^{2}) of mezzanine space for social-services programs. There are activities rooms on each of the upper stories, including computer rooms, fitness rooms, art studios, and music-rehearsal rooms. The spaces also include a library, television room, and game room, as well as a rooftop terrace covering 7,000 square feet (650 m^{2}). The plans originally called for a kitchen and dining room on the 15th floor, but after city officials refused to fund the dining room and kitchen, Common Ground began looking for private financing to pay for these spaces.

==== Residential units ====
When the hotel was built, it contained 875 bedrooms, 460 of which had bathrooms. In addition, there were 68 baths with showers. By the 1980s, the hotel had been downsized to 735 rooms. The upper floors contained hallways with simple plaster walls.

In the early 1990s, the Times Square Hotel was converted to 652 units of supportive housing. The rooms were divided among existing residents, single people with extremely low incomes, and formerly homeless and mentally ill people. About half of the units were designated for low-income adults; these included 96 units of subsidized housing and 130 units of unsubsidized housing for people who earned less than the median income for the New York metropolitan area. The remaining units were allocated to people who formerly lived in homeless shelters. Of these, 50 units were set aside for people with HIV/AIDS, while 200 additional units were set aside for people who had undergone mental-illness treatment. When the renovation was complete, 80 percent of the units had kitchens, and all units had private bathrooms. Units typically covered 110 square feet (10 m^{2}), excluding bathrooms.

== History ==
=== Development ===
During the late 1910s, developer Henry Claman acquired a site on 43rd Street between Seventh and Eighth Avenues, measuring 100 by 100 square feet (9.3 by 9.3 m^{2}), where he planned to build a movie theater. The site had been partially excavated during World War I, but construction was paused during the war. High demand for hotels near Times Square after the war prompted Claman to instead develop a hotel on the site. Claman wished to cater to single men, including soldiers who had been demobilized after the war, and he believed a site in the center of the Theater District was ideal for such a hotel. Architecture firm Gronenberg and Leuchtag was hired to design the hotel, and they filed plans with the New York City Department of Buildings in 1919.

Claman acquired an adjacent site measuring 75 feet (23 m) on Eighth Avenue and 100 feet (30 m) on 43rd Street from the Charles A. Christmas estate in March 1920. The parcels had been occupied by small stores and houses, as well as a church. Gronenberg and Leuchtag submitted revised plans for a 14-story hotel on the site in February 1921. The project was to cost $1.5 million, while the site was appraised at $1 million. The American Bond and Mortgage Company placed a $1.5 million mortgage loan on the site in early 1922. By that November, the exterior was nearly complete, and the developers were preparing model rooms for public inspection. The hotel was completed in April 1923 as the Claman Hotel. The New York Times called it "the finest structure on Eighth Avenue north of the Pennsylvania station".

=== Bachelor and tourist hotel ===
==== 1920s to 1940s ====
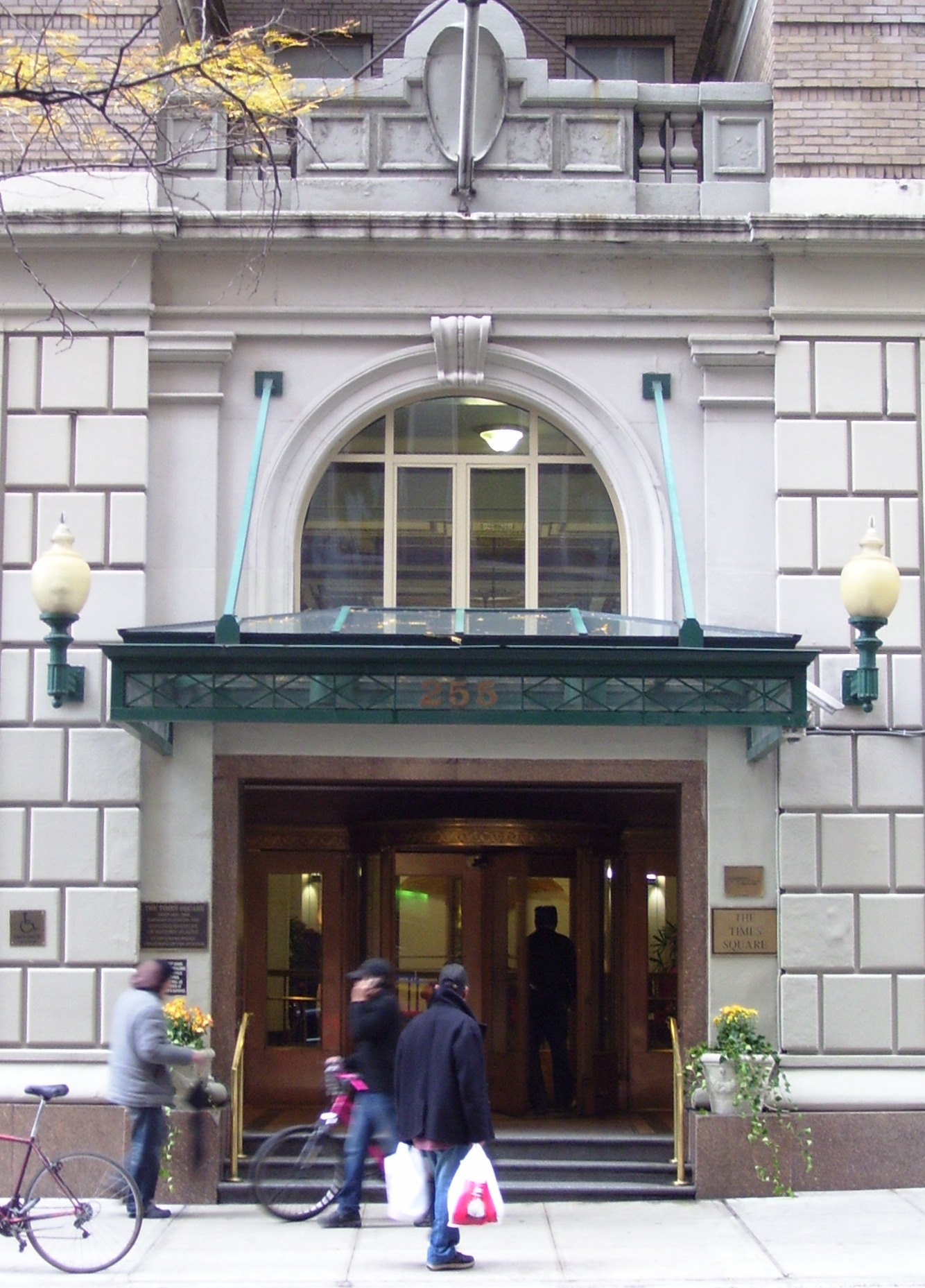
Hotel entrance

The hostelry was originally a bachelor hotel, catering to single men. One source called the Claman Hotel a "pioneer among the many big hotels and apartment hotels that are to follow in the reaches below Central Park". In January 1924, Claman agreed to sell the hotel to Manger Hotels; at the time, the hotel was valued at $4 million. The new owners changed the name to the Times Square Hotel that March, and they set aside one floor for women to attract a wider range of guests. By the mid-1920s, the hotel was profitable; the Times said the hotel "shows, in its success, the wisdom of its projector". In 1929, architect L. Scacchetti is recorded as having filed plans with the Manhattan Bureau of Buildings for alterations to the hotel, although these changes were not immediately carried out. According to the Claman family, which remained involved with the hotel, the Times Square was one of four hotels in New York City that did not record a loss between 1930 and 1935, despite the onset of the Great Depression.

The Manger family sold the Times Square Hotel in March 1931 to a syndicate headed by William S. Brown for an estimated $3.5 million. At the time, the hotel was valued at $2.555 million. Brown served as the hotel's general manager until his death in 1934. During his tenure as manager, Brown set aside 10 percent of the rooms for unemployed white-collar workers, who could stay at the hotel free for up to six months. The rooms were spread across the hotel; although nearly all of the tenants offered to pay their back rent once they had been hired, Brown declined their offers. When stand-up alcoholic bars were legalized in New York state in 1934, a stand-up bar was installed in the hotel's American Bar. Henry Claman's son Sidney Claman, (Note: Claman's name has also been spelled "Sydney".) who succeeded Brown as the hotel's president, announced in September 1935 that he had added 24 rooms there. Claman announced the next year that the hotel had completed $100,000 worth of renovations, including an air-conditioning system in the restaurant, as well as the merger of several small rooms.

By 1940, the hotel's grill room had become a popular venue for musical performances. The hotel remained popular in part because of its proximity to transit, as well as tourist attractions such as nearby Broadway theaters, the Empire State Building, Rockefeller Center, and St. Patrick's Cathedral. The Claman family completed a seven-story parking lot on an adjacent site in 1950, leasing the parking lot to Theodore Sylvan for about $1.5 million a year. Interior design firm Lippincott and Margulies renovated the ground story in 1952, converting an unused portion of the lobby into a bar and restaurant called the Headline Room. The hotel remained popular among tourists, as well as people working at the nearby New York Times headquarters.

Claman and Abne Freeman announced in November 1955 that they had sold the hotel for an undisclosed amount to a group led by Albert Harris. Harris's group planned to extensively renovate the hotel, which at the time contained 600 rooms. Harris's group, the 680 Corporation (named after the hotel's alternate street address at 680 Eighth Avenue), took title to the building in February 1956.

==== 1960s to early 1980s ====
Arthur Schwebel indicated in February 1962 that he planned to lease the Times Square Hotel for 90 years at a cost of $30 million. At the time, the hotel had 900 rooms, two restaurants, a lounge, a bar, and several retail stores. Schwebel planned to renovate the entire hotel. Hotel Times Square Associates, a partnership headed by Schwebel, agreed to lease the hotel from Harris for 30 years that August, with options for two 30-year renewals. The next year, Schwebel changed the name of the hotel to the Times Square Motor Hotel. Schwebel said he had added the word "Motor" because of high demand for mid-priced hotels that offered their guests free parking. To attract tourists and deter long-term residents, the hotel's operators renovated the rooms, then raised rents by between 12 and 15 percent. Schwebel's partnership ran the building until 1981.

The Times Square Hotel experienced several fires in the late 1960s, including a 1967 blaze that killed two guests and another incident in 1969 that injured three guests. The hotel gained a reputation for prostitution and drug use during the 1970s. On a sidewalk just outside the hotel, a vent for the New York City steam system attracted encampments of drunk people. In addition, a guest was killed in an explosion in 1980. During that decade, The New York Times described the hotel as a "hell for the homeless", citing its high crime rate and poor physical condition.

=== Welfare hotel ===
==== Covenant House ====
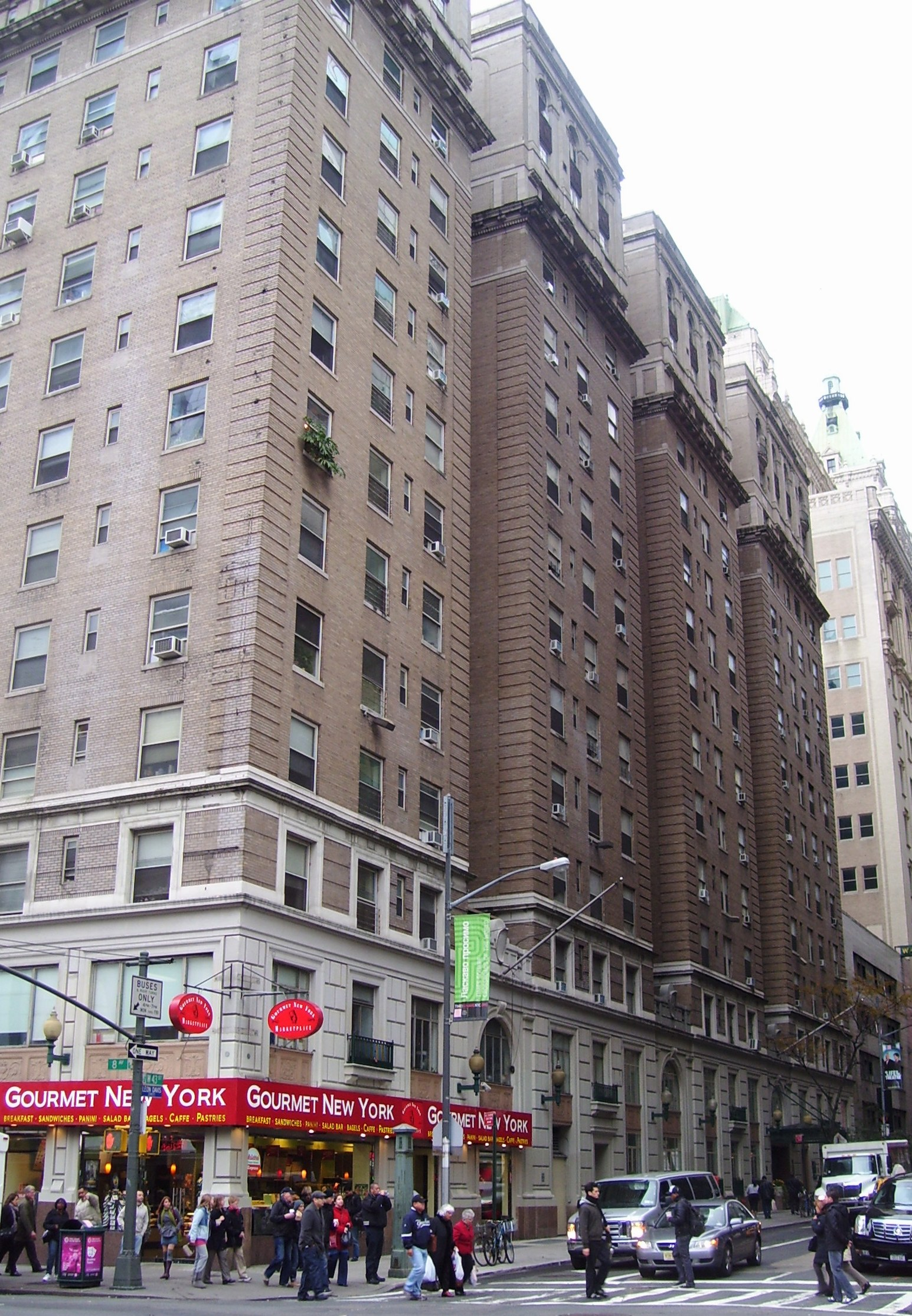
View from Eighth Avenue

The nonprofit organization Covenant House agreed in September 1984 to pay $15 million for the hotel. The organization converted three floors into corporate offices and operating the remainder of the building as a hotel. At the time, Covenant House had outgrown its existing building nearby, The New York City government used the hotel as a shelter for homeless families, but Covenant House officials said the hotel would continue to serve existing residents. Covenant House borrowed $16.5 million from Lincoln Savings and Loan. Bruce Ritter, the priest who had founded Covenant House, planned to use the hotel as a youth shelter. The plan was contingent on the expiration of a moratorium preventing the demolition or conversion of single room occupancy (SRO) apartments across the city, including those in the Times Square Hotel. Ritter wanted to remove some of the Times Square's SRO units to make way for an elevator, and he wished to merge several units and rent them to tourists.

Covenant House operated the 735-room hotel at a loss for three years. By 1987, the hotel was incurring a net deficit of $3 million every year. The SRO moratorium was extended by five years in January 1987, preventing Ritter from combining or eliminating any of the Times Square's SRO units. As a result, Covenant House filed a lawsuit against the city the same year, asking that the SRO moratorium be overturned. The hotel also tried to discourage long-term residents by asking guests to show their passports if they wanted to rent a room.

To cover the hotel's financial deficits, Covenant House began operating some rooms as a youth hostel. Starting in April 1987, the American Independent Hostel operated 200 rooms, renting them to students for $14 per night. The hostel's officials offered free rooms to students who helped promote the hostel, and the rooms soon became popular among students. In addition, the hotel's operators spent $3.5 million on renovations. Several dozen full-time residents also refused to pay rent in 1987, claiming that hotel officials were harassing them. The full-time residents alleged that hotel officials had built a poor door and a separate reception area in the basement, and that officials had reactivated an unused elevator but programmed it to serve only the hotel's top five stories, where most tenants did not live. In addition, residents claimed they no longer reliably received telephone messages.

==== Sale and bankruptcy ====
Ritter placed the hotel for sale in 1987, and Covenant House had identified two potential buyers by November 1987. The same month, mayor Ed Koch announced that he was planning to acquire the Times Square Hotel, either by purchasing the building or by condemning it. Covenant House had outbid the city government for the former National Maritime Union Building in Chelsea, Manhattan, that September, and the Koch administration wanted to buy the Times Square Hotel as a result. The city planned to accommodate the hotel's 330 existing residents, many of whom were disabled or elderly. Another 300 rooms would be renovated and rented to homeless people with jobs, and about 100 rooms would be reserved for newly released inmates. Although the city offered $20 million for the hotel, Covenant House refused this offer. At the end of December 1987, the New York International Hostel Corporation bought the hotel from Covenant House. As a result, the city canceled its plans for housing recently released inmates at the hotel. Shortly afterward, city officials tried to acquire the hotel through condemnation.

The new owners filed for Chapter 11 bankruptcy protection in 1988. A federal court appointed hotelier Tran Dinh Truong, who also operated the neighboring Hotel Carter. as an interim operator. The city government and the Legal Aid Society unsuccessfully attempted to prevent Tran from operating the Times Square, claiming in a federal lawsuit that Tran had exhibited "prior misconduct, gross mismanagement and/or incompetence" in managing the Carter. Tran's lawyer said that Tran had fixed more than 1,000 building-code violations at the Times Square, but city officials said Tran never fixed these violations. As part of the Chapter 11 proceeding, an investigator found that the hotel had several safety violations, including accumulations of garbage; missing window guards; and fire extinguishers that were stored in the basement instead of being mounted properly. Residents complained that the elevators were not working and that they had to sweep lead paint from the floor twice a day. The hotel's security was extremely lax; the Chapter 11 investigator found that people frequently traded firearms and started fires within the hotel.

Meanwhile, city officials moved homeless families to the Times Square Hotel in the late 1980s, paying as much as $2,640 per month for each family. After officials found peeling lead paint in 18 rooms, the city withheld rent payments for these rooms in December 1988; a city inspector subsequently discovered that nearly a hundred rooms had peeling paint. The Times Square housed 12 homeless families in August 1989, but the rate of relocations increased significantly during the following three months, in part because of an increase in the city's homeless population. By November 1989, the hotel had 250 homeless families, the second-highest number of any hotel in the city. A judge for the New York City Civil Court appointed the New York City Department of Housing Preservation and Development as the hotel's operator in January 1990. City officials immediately began fixing over 1,000 building-code violations and cleaning up the hotel. At that point, the Times Square housed 182 homeless families and 250 single residents.

Daniel Gerwin, the director of nonprofit organization Columbia University Community Services, launched a program at the hotel in the early 1990s, showing residents' artwork. The administration of mayor David Dinkins began soliciting proposals for the hotel's future use in 1990. The city originally planned to operate most of the Times Square as a tourist hotel, relocating existing SRO residents to a separate wing. Rosanne Haggerty, director of nonprofit organization Common Ground, subsequently convinced the city to convert the hotel into supportive housing instead. Haggerty called the hotel "a scene of complete social chaos", saying there were 1,700 building code violations. Haggerty and architect Bruce Becker created a joint proposal to acquire the hotel.

=== Supportive housing ===
==== Common Ground renovation ====
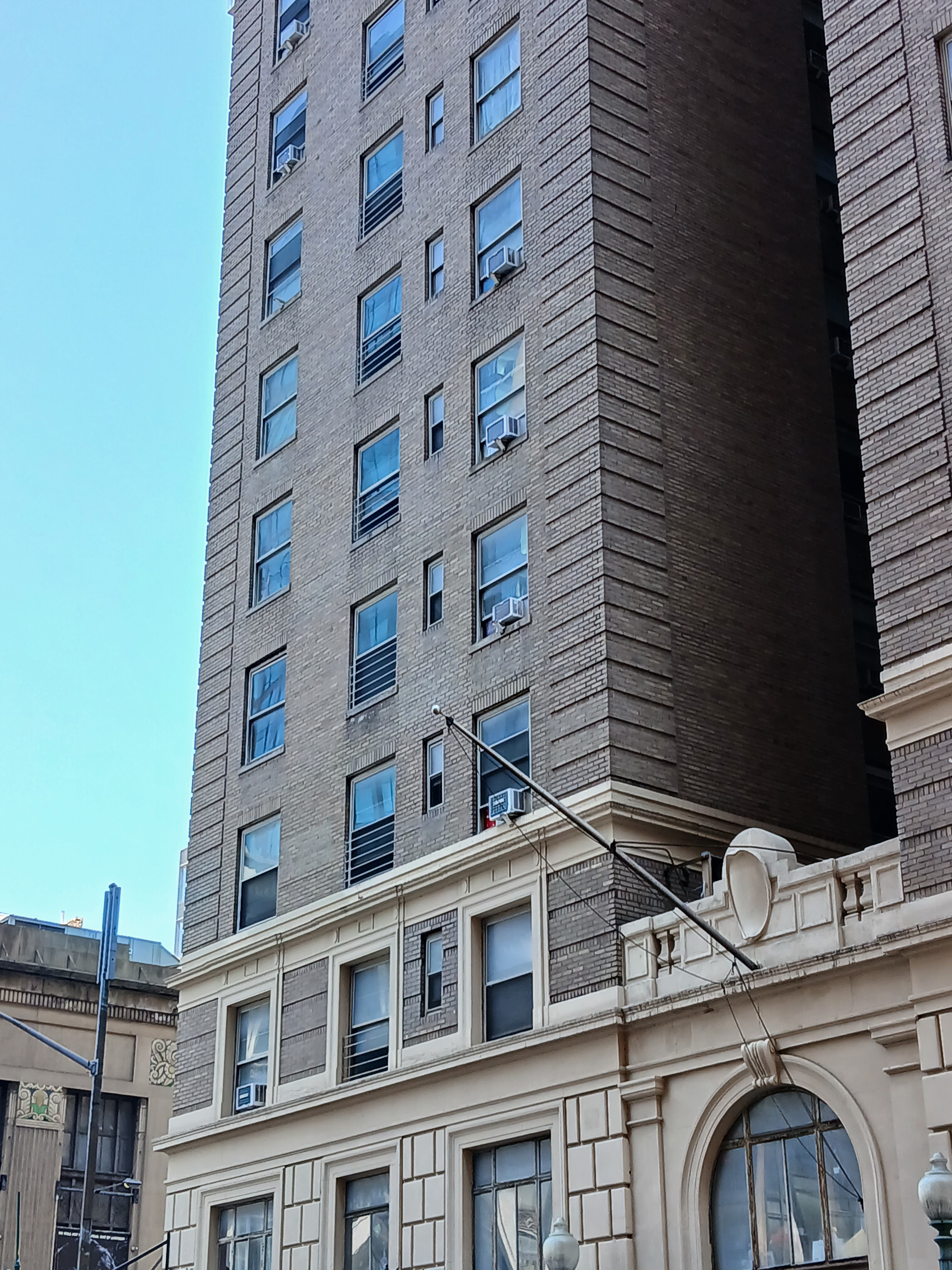
Westernmost wing

In January 1991, mayor David Dinkins announced that the city government would lend $27 million to Common Ground, which would purchase the hotel for $9.5 million and spend the remainder of the loan on renovations. Common Ground planned to convert the hotel to 652 supportive housing apartments. The units would be roughly evenly divided among existing SRO residents; single people with extremely low incomes; and New York City Human Resources Administration (HRA) clients, who included homeless people, as well as those with mental illnesses or AIDS. Additionally, Common Ground and Columbia University Community Services would operate mental-health and social programs at the hotel. Haggerty wanted formerly-homeless residents and low-income residents to live in the same parts of the building, rather than segregating them, to create what The Christian Science Monitor described as "a community that gives more permanence than the shelter environment". The organization only had to pay the one-percent interest rate on the city's interest-only loan; the principal on the loan amounted to about $14,000 for each room.

Despite objections from New York state officials involved with the nearby 42nd Street Redevelopment Project, who believed the hotel would delay plans for the redevelopment project. Dinkins approved Common Ground's acquisition of the hotel. The project was Common Ground's first supportive-housing development and, at the time, the largest such development in the United States. It was also the largest project to receive financing from the New York City government's SRO Loan Fund. The U.S. government gave Common Ground a tax credit to fund the restoration of the hotel's interior. In addition to reconfiguring the hotel rooms into apartments, the project entailed restoring the lobby, as well as adding new sprinklers, fire alarms, and electrical heating systems. During the renovation, several construction workers went on strike, alleging that Common Ground hired unqualified workers and undocumented immigrants and underpaid them. Common Ground officials responded that, since it was a nonprofit organization, Common Ground was not required to pay workers at a rate that had been negotiated by labor unions.

The first phase of the renovation, comprising 364 units with their own kitchens and bathrooms, was completed in February 1993. The units were rented to 175 SRO tenants and 189 new residents. There were delays in renting out the units that were designated for people with AIDS, as the HRA had failed to correctly advertise a request for proposal for the units for several months. The New York State Urban Development Corporation gave Common Ground a $234,050 grant to renovate the storefronts. Afterward, ice-cream company Ben & Jerry's agreed to give Common Ground a franchise for one of the storefronts in 1993; the company also agreed to hire 12 of the hotel's residents and waive Common Ground's $25,000 franchise fee. Common Ground also wanted to raise between $12 million and $15 million from private sources.

==== Operation ====
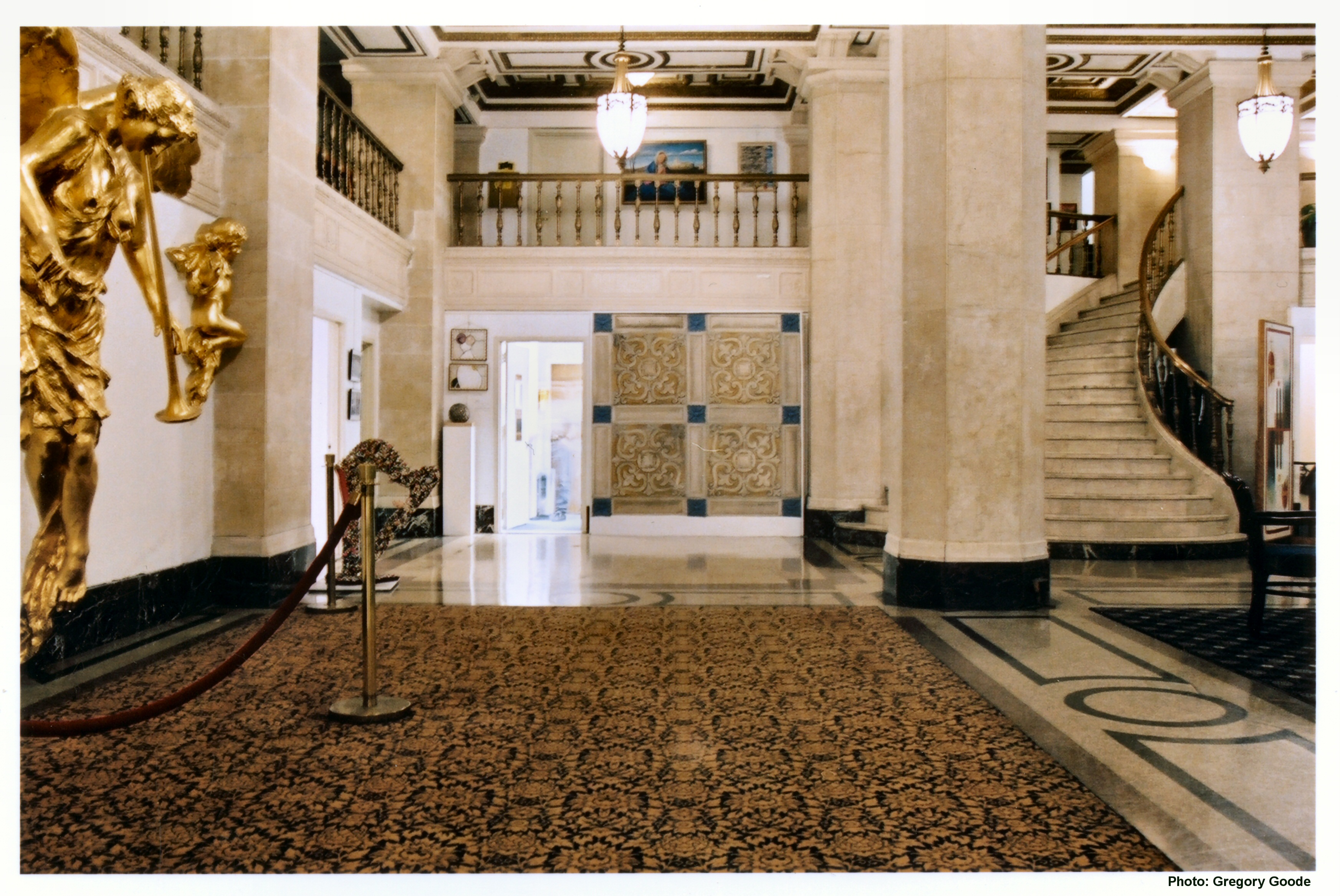
Lobby interior

Officials began renting out the remaining 288 units in April 1994. The rooms were rented out for no more than $500 per month, and Common Ground offered some of the units to actors who worked in the neighborhood. As the remaining SRO units were vacated, Common Ground officials divided these apartments evenly between low-income adults and HRA clients. The hotel operated social-services programs for formerly homeless residents, as well as people with AIDS and mental illnesses. Several dozen residents worked for the hotel itself and for the Ben & Jerry's store at the hotel's base, which by 1994 was one of Ben & Jerry's most profitable franchisees. The hotel also operated a welfare-to-work program for residents, and over a hundred residents had obtained full-time jobs by the late 1990s. In addition, the hotel had a 24-hour security patrol, and drug use was banned. The hotel did provide drug addiction recovery groups, but prospective tenants with a "recent history of drug abuse" were disqualified from living there.

The New York Times wrote in 1994 that "the experiment at 255 West 43d Street was intended to demonstrate that single-room-occupancy hotels can be salvaged", and Newsday said in 1998 that residents described it as "very safe and community oriented". By 2000, the Times Square Hotel housed many people with AIDS, as well as formerly homeless residents with drug issues or mental illnesses; many of the hotel's low-income residents were musicians or actors. Several newspapers said that, after Common Ground took over the Times Square Hotel, the neighborhood's rates of homelessness had decreased by 87 percent. British newspaper The Observer reported that very few residents became homeless again. Common Ground, which was renamed Breaking Ground in the 2010s, continues to operate the hotel as of 2025.

== See also ==
- National Register of Historic Places listings in Manhattan from 14th to 59th Streets
- List of hotels in New York City
