= Rosanne Haggerty =

- Born: 1961 (age 63–64)
- Education: Amherst College (BA); Columbia University (MArch); New York University

Rosanne Haggerty (born 1961) is an American housing and community development leader, and founder of Common Ground Community and later of Community Solutions. Haggerty redeveloped the Times Square Hotel, a building on the National Register of Historic Places, reducing homelessness by 87 percent in the 20-block neighborhood around it.

Haggerty attended Amherst College for a bachelor's in American studies, Columbia University's Graduate School of Architecture, Planning and Preservation for a Master of Architecture, and is a PhD student in sociology at New York University.

She was an Adelaide Thinker in Residence in Adelaide, Australia. South Australian Premier Mike Rann and Social Inclusion Commissioner David Cappo backed Haggerty's recommendations with a multimillion-dollar investment in inner-city apartment buildings tailor-made for homeless people, establishing Common Ground Adelaide and Street to Home.

== Awards and honors ==
- 1998 Peter Drucker Award
- 2001 MacArthur Fellows Program
- 2003 Honorary Doctorate from Amherst College
- 2007 Ashoka Fellowship
- 2008 Goto Shimpei Award
- 2012 Jane Jacobs Medal for New Ideas and Activism
- 2015 Schwab Foundation Social Entrepreneur
- 2015 Design Mind by the Cooper Hewitt, Smithsonian Design Museum’s National Design Award
- 2017 Honorary Doctor of Humane Letters from Emmanuel College (Massachusetts)
- 2017 John W. Gardner Leadership Award
