= Buffalo Meter Company Building =

- U.S. National Register of Historic Places
- Buffalo Meter Company Building, September 2019

- Location within New York Location within the United States
- Location: 2917 Main St., Buffalo, New York
- Coordinates: 42°56′39″N 78°49′51″W
- Area: 6.12 acres (2.48 ha)
- Built: 1915-1917
- Architect: Lockwood, Green & Co.; Bassett, George Barclay
- NRHP reference No.: 12000476
- Added to NRHP: August 7, 2012

Buffalo Meter Company Building is a historic daylight factory building located in Buffalo, Erie County, New York, United States. It was designed and built by the Lockwood, Green & Co. engineering firm in 1915-1917 and is a four-story, reinforced concrete building faced in red brick. It has a fifth floor penthouse, raised basement, a large three story addition built in 1945, and two story office addition built in 1949. The building measures 284 feet by 82 feet.

The building was built for and housed the Buffalo Meter Company until 1969–1970, after which it was acquired by the University of Buffalo. It was renamed Bethune Hall, after prominent local architect Louise Blanchard Bethune and housed the Department of Art. It is being redeveloped as the Bethune Lofts.

It was listed on the National Register of Historic Places in 2012.

== Gallery ==
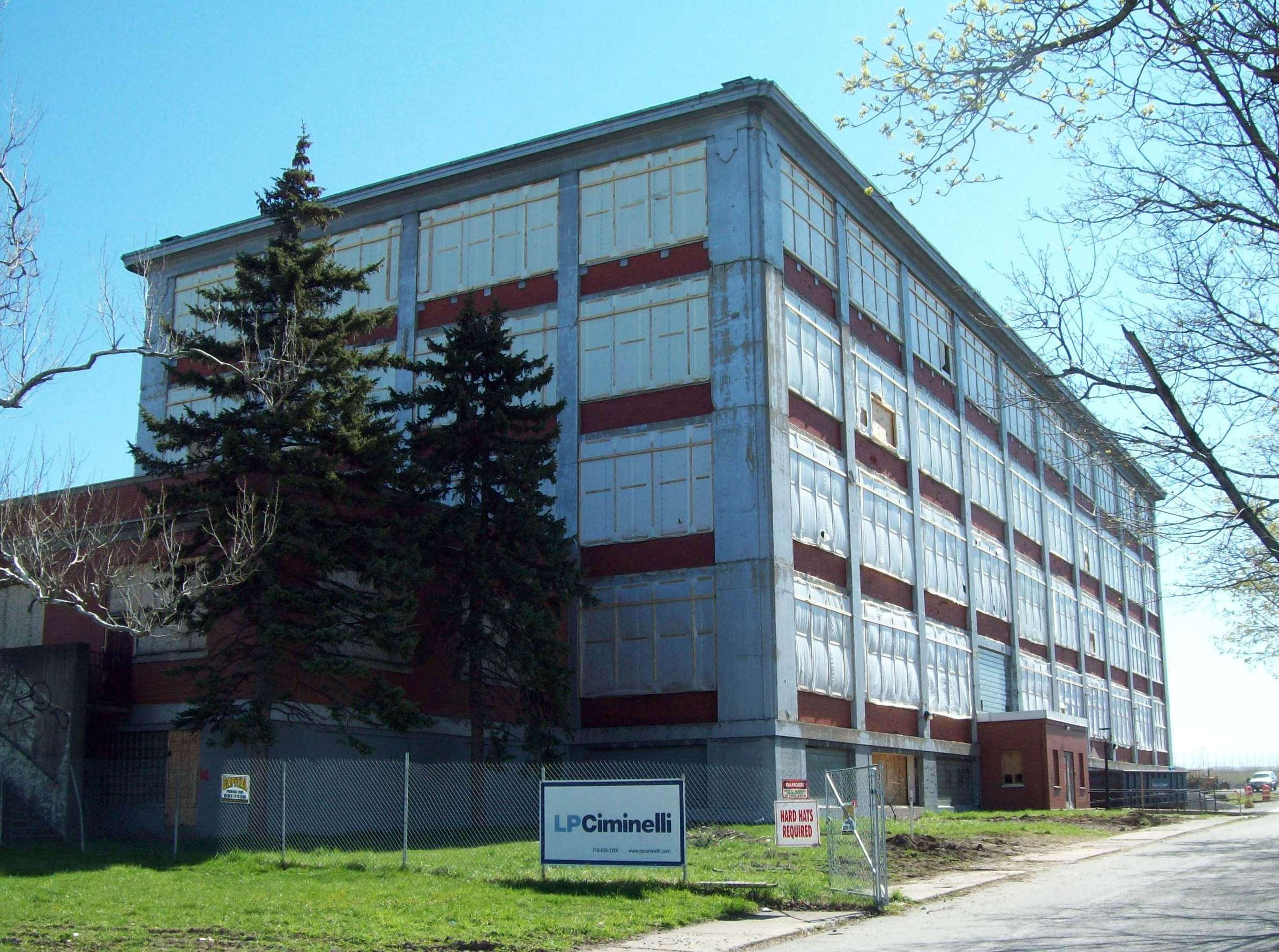
Buffalo Meter Company, April 2012
