= Hotel Lafayette =

- U.S. National Register of Historic Places
- New York State Register of Historic Places
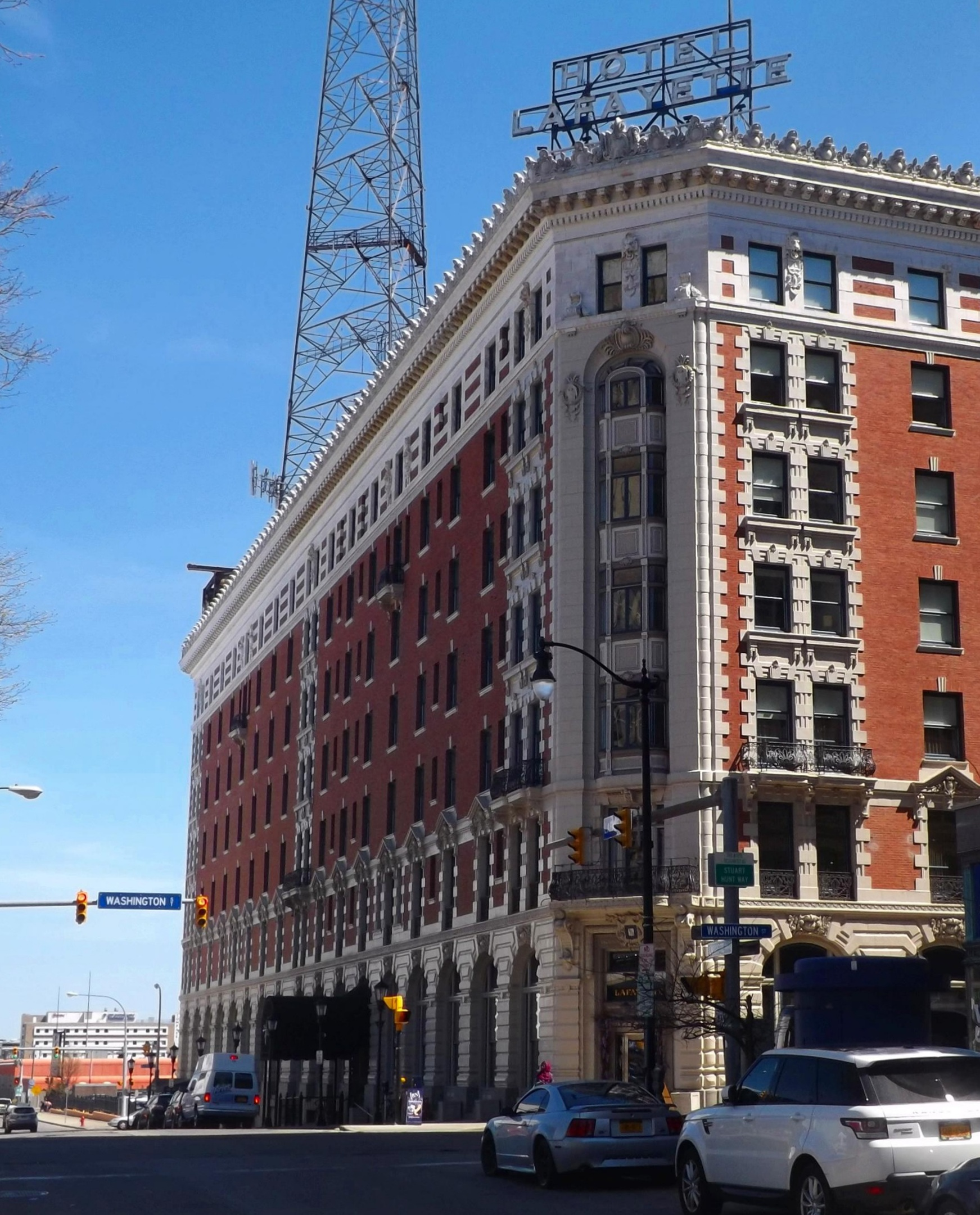
- Hotel Lafayette, May 2015
- Interactive map of Hotel Lafayette
- Location: 391 Washington St., Buffalo, New York
- Coordinates: 42°53′4″N 78°52′22″W
- Area: 0.86 acres (0.35 ha)
- Built: 1902
- Architects: Bethune, Bethune & Fuchs (1902–1912); Esenwein and Johnson (1913–1937); and Roswell E. Pfohl / Design Inc. (1942 lobby)
- Architectural style: French Renaissance
- NRHP reference No.: 10000555
- NYSRHP No.: 02940.002994

Significant dates
- Added to NRHP: August 19, 2010
- Designated NYSRHP: June 25, 2010

Hotel Lafayette, also known as the Lafayette Hotel, is a historic hotel building located in Buffalo in Erie County, New York.

== History and features ==
It is a seven-story steel frame and concrete building designed in the French Renaissance style. It is composed of several rectangular building units completed between 1902 and 1926. It features decorative vitreous red brick and white terra cotta trim. The hotel is the masterpiece of Louise Blanchard Bethune (1856–1913), the first professional woman architect in the United States.

The original building was designed by the firm of Bethune, Bethune & Fuchs and built between 1902 and 1911. Additions from 1916–1917 and 1924–1926 were completed by Esenwein and Johnson. The lobby was decorated in 1942 in the Art Moderne style. In its prime, the Lafayette Hotel was considered one of the 15 finest hotels in the country. Besides elevators, every room featured hot and cold water and a telephone. A 97 m (318 ft) antenna is attached to the building. From September 29 to December 19, 1953 it was home to the short-lived television station WBES-TV.

In the 1970s and 1980s, it was owned by Tran Dinh Truong, under whose tenure the hotel became a "quasi crack house".

It was listed on the National Register of Historic Places in 2010.

=== 2012 renovation ===
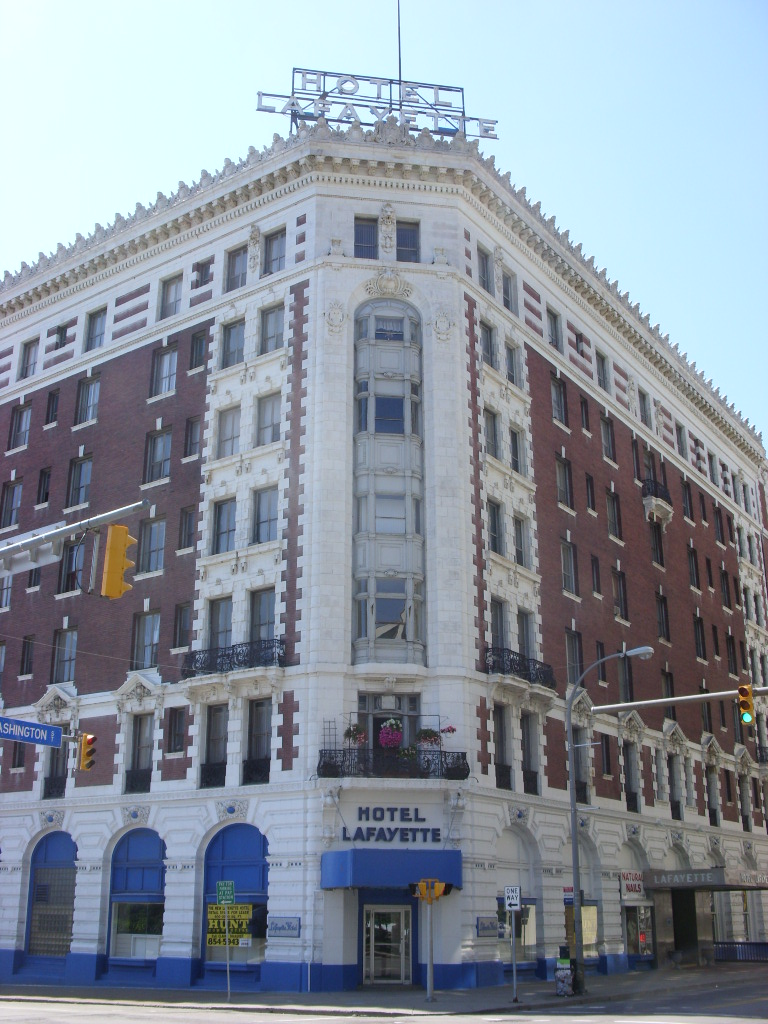
The building before renovation, 2009

In 2012, the completion of a $35 million rehabilitation project restored the hotel to its original beauty. The hotel now contains 92 one & two bedroom apartments, 57 hotel rooms, several bars, restaurants and banquet facilities. Following Buffalo ReUse stripping the building, its renovation was conducted by Buffalo property developer Rocco Termini, along with architect Jonathan Morris and his team at Carmina Wood Morris PC.
