= Breaking Ground =

Nonprofit organization in New York City

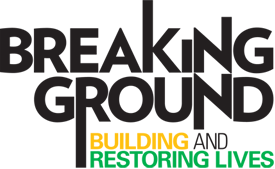
- Formation: 1990; 36 years ago
- Founder: Rosanne Haggerty
- Type: Nonprofit
- Headquarters: 505 Eighth Avenue, 5th Floor
- Location: New York City, New York, U.S.
- Region served: New York City, Connecticut, and upstate New York
- President & CEO: Brenda Rosen
- Chairman: Michael J. Franco
- Treasurer: Benjamin Stacks
- Secretary: Nicholas Tsang
- Website: breakingground.org
- Formerly called: Common Ground Community Housing Development Fund Corp. Inc.; Common Ground Community

Breaking Ground, formerly Common Ground, is a nonprofit social services organization in New York City whose goal is to create high-quality permanent and transitional housing for the homeless. Its philosophy holds that supportive housing costs substantially less than homeless shelters — and many times less than jail cells or hospital rooms, and that people with psychiatric and other problems can better manage them once they are permanently housed and provided with services. Since its founding in 1990 by Rosanne Haggerty, the organization has created more than 5,000 units of housing for the homeless. Haggerty left the organization in 2011 to found Community Solutions, Inc. Brenda Rosen was promoted from Director, Housing Operations and Programs to Executive Director, and has led the organization since.

Breaking Ground began by rehabilitating the Times Square Hotel (located at 8th Avenue and 43rd Street), which opened in 1991. It then restored other historic properties including the Prince George Hotel, opened in 1999. Since 2000, Breaking Ground has expanded to new construction, developing a total of 15 residences, with another 1,000 units in various stages of development.

In Australia, following a report by Haggerty to the South Australian Government, Premier Mike Rann and Social Inclusion Commissioner David Cappo backed Haggerty's recommendations with a multimillion-dollar investment in inner city apartment buildings. Common Ground Adelaide and Street to Home were established and have now been adopted in other Australian States.

== Programs ==
=== Street to Home ===
Among Breaking Ground's activities is conducting street outreach, which consists of documenting the homeless population and then trying to persuade those who spend the most time on the streets to seek permanent housing, even if they still have drug, alcohol or medical problems. Breaking Ground is contracted by the City of New York to conduct street outreach in all of Brooklyn and Queens and nearly one third of Manhattan.

Some of those involved in the issue of homelessness consider Breaking Ground a pioneer in this approach in the United States.

However, the count, which has been adopted by the city for use in other areas, is not an end to itself, but a first step. According to Becky Kanis, the former Director of Breaking Ground's "Innovations Department",

The important part is what we do with this information. We want to move from crisis management to lasting solutions. Other cities have done that successfully. We plan to do the same.... At the real end of the day the only thing that's going to matter is the people who have been thus far completely unwilling to accept the offers of shelter, etc. by outreach workers. Can we reach them and make a positive difference in their lives? What can we do compassionately to help these people who have, for all practical purposes, fallen through the cracks of society? That's where our focus is; that's what matters. ... We don't know exactly what's going to work here in New York, but we know what's worked in other cities. Therefore, we're going to spend our efforts doing those things, and as we find smarter and better ways to do things we will adopt them.

The Street to Home initiative is a partnership of Breaking Ground and the Times Square Alliance, and the strategy reduced homelessness by 87% over two years. It incorporates strategic targeting of individuals and intensive followup modeled on the successful approach used in the United Kingdom's Rough Sleepers Initiative. The Rough Sleepers Initiative achieved a 75% reduction in street homelessness across England and prompted deeper investment in homelessness from Parliament. In New York City, Street to Home has been adopted as a citywide strategy to reduce street homelessness by two-thirds within three years. Breaking Ground will direct all efforts on the streets of midtown Manhattan and throughout the boroughs of Brooklyn and Queens.

Breaking Ground's initial strategy was to deal with a 20-block neighborhood around Times Square with one of the highest levels of homelessness in the city, focusing on securing housing for those who have been living on the street the longest and need housing the most. They replaced the random "first come, first served" approach with a targeted, strategic process: identify and prioritize the most vulnerable individuals on the street, assess and negotiate housing options with those individuals, then house and retain.

==== Identify and Prioritize ====
Street to Home partners with Business Improvement District public safety officers or community outreach workers who – because they are on the front lines every day – have a thorough knowledge of the people continually living on their streets. They are trained by Breaking Ground in approaches to introduce clients to a housing team that will help them to secure housing. A simple tracking tool enables workers to differentiate between those who are consistently in the targeted area – called "anchors" – and those who are transients. The role of "anchor" individuals in street homelessness was identified in the Rough Sleepers Initiative, with subsequent targeting of those individuals yielding greater success – a tipping point – in engaging and moving individuals in the surrounding area. Breaking Ground developed a research-based Vulnerability Index to take the guesswork out of outreach and offer a rational system for prioritizing the most vulnerable homeless for housing.

==== Assess and Negotiate ====
Because most people who have lived on the streets for a long time are suffering from multiple disabilities and are usually eligible for some form of housing subsidy, Breaking Ground trains service providers in how to assess for eligibility for housing, services, and benefits, and provides tips on expediting this process. With the immediacy of the housing offer in hand for the individual, Street to Home uses techniques derived from Motivational Interviewing and Trauma Informed Care in working with clients to negotiate placement into housing. Street to Home assesses each individual's eligibility for subsidized housing and income benefits and walks each person through the process of obtaining permanent housing- registering for disability or income support benefits, completing medical and psychiatric tests, and finding an apartment that fits the person's needs.

==== House and Retain ====
Since the start of the Street to Home initiative, Breaking Ground has helped more than 175 adults – who had been homeless an average of 9.9 years – move from the streets directly into permanent housing, where more than 90% are able to maintain their housing. Most individuals who have lived on the streets for long periods do not wish to live in a shelter but want and are successful in their own homes, which begins their reintegration into society. Some clients of Street to Home have re-established relationships with family members. Many are working or have returned to school.

=== Foyer ===
While on vacation in Ireland, Breaking Ground founder Rosanne Haggerty learned about the Foyer Program in the city of Belfast, a model long used in France, Ireland, and England to help young people without family and at risk of homelessness make the transition to adulthood. Haggerty hoped the model might be useful in New York City, where about 20 percent of homeless adults have a history of foster care, and where, according to one city agency, some 3,700 young people will age out of foster care between 2002 and 2004.

Haggerty decided to replicate the Foyer Program in her next project – the renovation of an old YMCA residence in Manhattan's Chelsea neighborhood, which set aside 40 of its 207 units for young adults ages 18 to 24 who are aging out of foster and residential care or are homeless or at risk of homelessness. The Chelsea Residence (The Christopher) provides employment, educational mentoring and life-skills training programs; participants work over an 18-month to two-year period toward permanent housing and stable employment. The $32 million project, which includes $9 million for acquisition, has received state, city and private financing.

Foyers are a way "to help people who aren't ready to be on their own to develop the life skills, job skills and maturity to lead independent, successful lives," according to Sister Paulette LoMonaco, executive director of New York City's Good Shepherd Services.

== Current residences ==
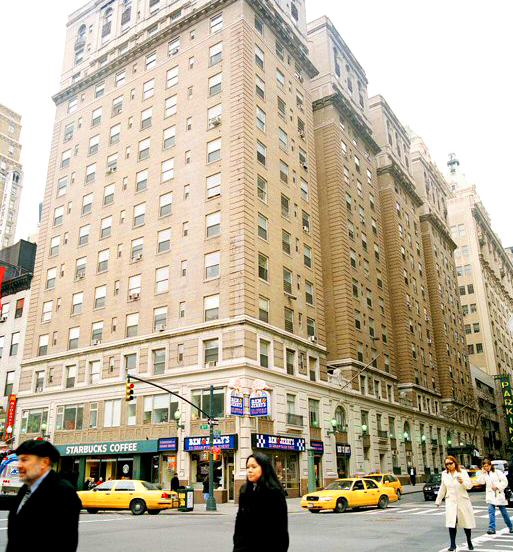
The Times Square Hotel

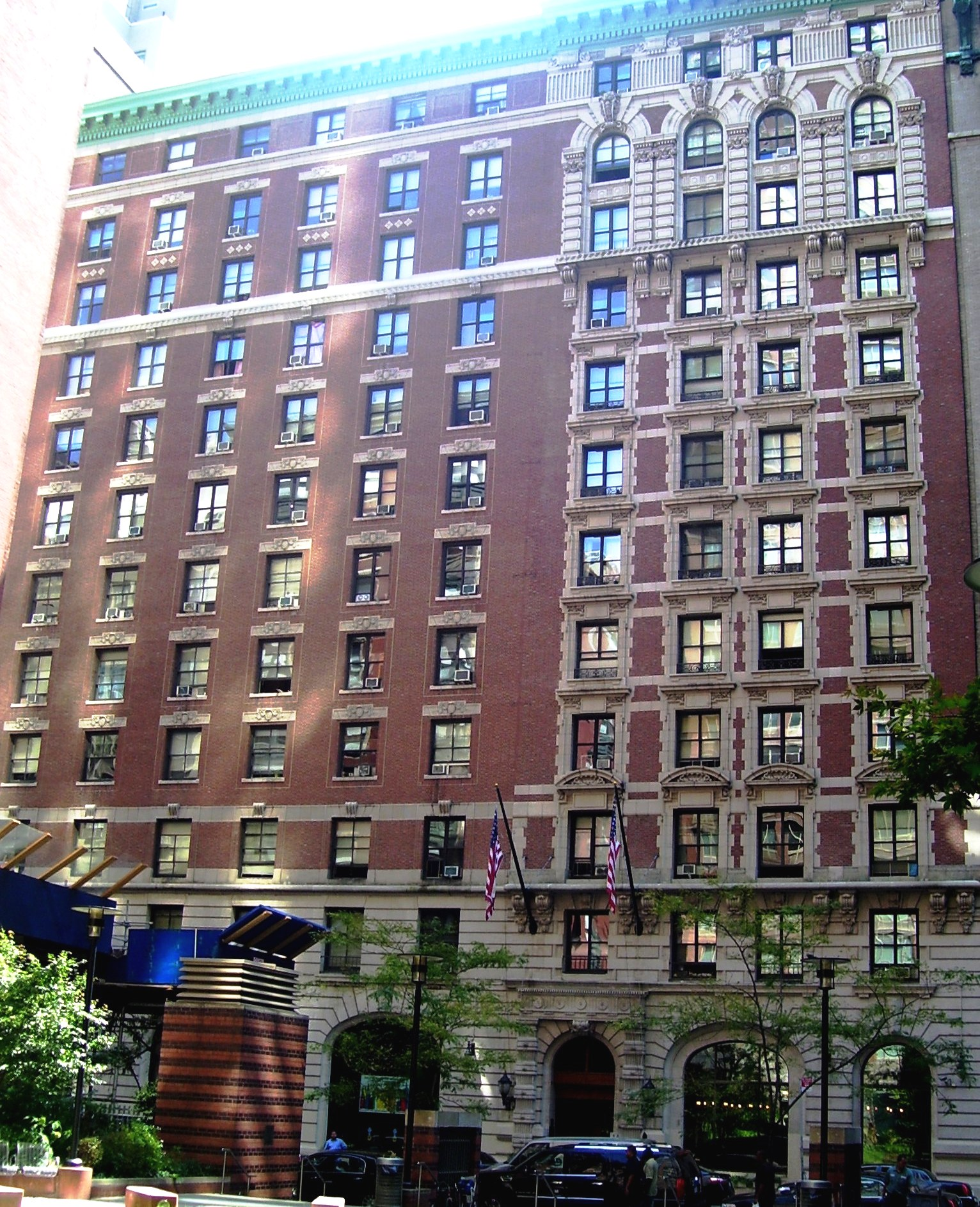
The Prince George

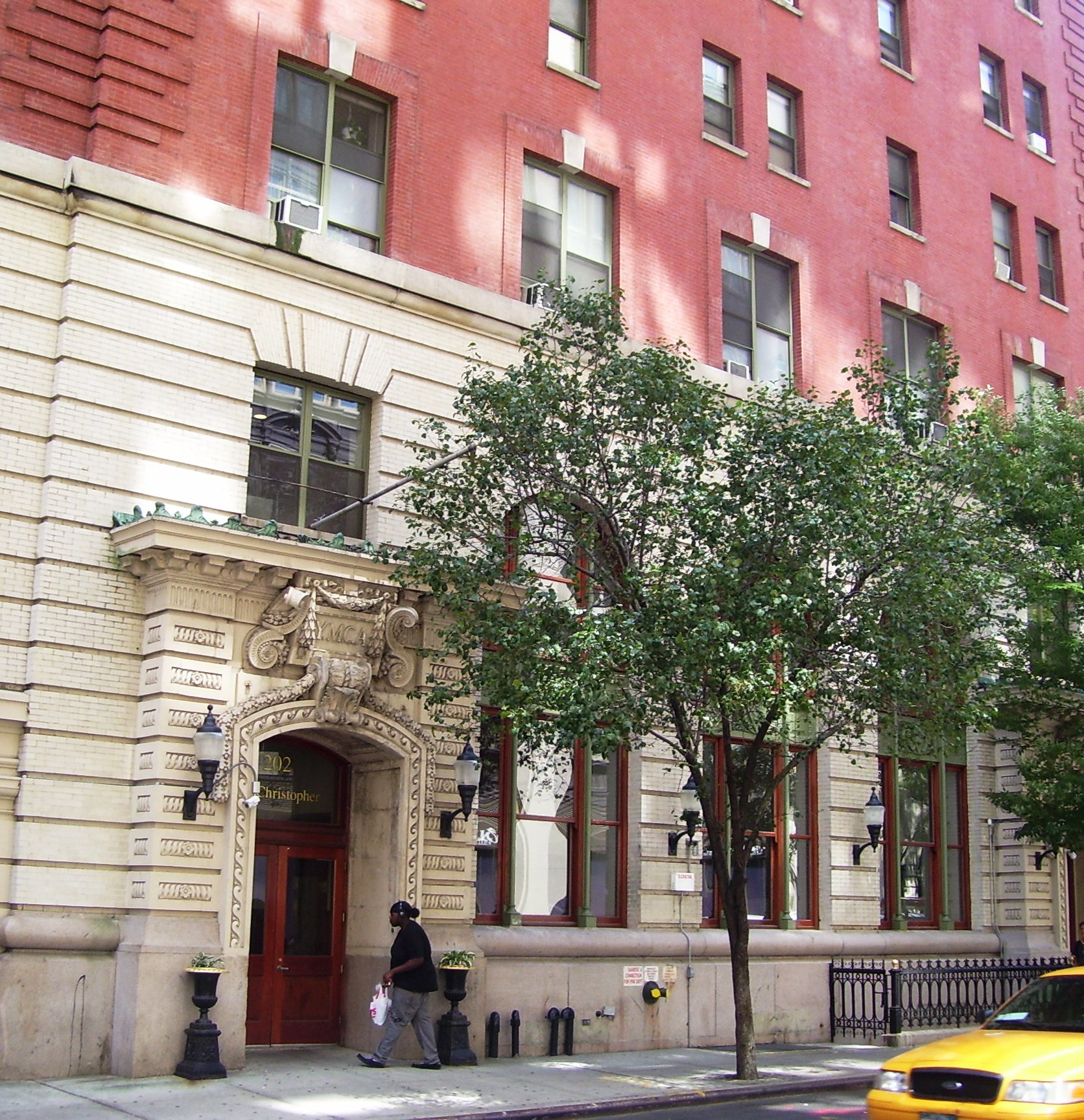
The Christopher

As of 2018 Breaking Ground has 24 buildings with 4,103 units.

Building	Location	Number of units
The Dorothy Ross Friedman (formerly The Aurora)	Midtown Manhattan	178
Cedarwoods	Willimantic, CT	56
The Christopher	Chelsea, Manhattan	207
The Domenech	Brownsville, Brooklyn	72
Eastman Commons	Rochester, NY	80
The Hegeman	Brownsville, Brooklyn	161
The Lee	Lower East Side, Manhattan	263
The Prince George	Midtown Manhattan	416
The Times Square	Times Square, Manhattan	652
The Schermerhorn	Downtown Brooklyn, New York	217
The Andrews	The Bowery, Manhattan	146
The Betty Ruth and Milton B. Hollander Foundation Center	Hartford, CT	70
The Brook	South Bronx	190
Boston Road	Morrisania	154
The Lenniger (owned by CUCS)	Tremont	92
40 Riverside	Upper West Side	55
The Sydelle (owned by CUCS)	Belmont	102
Redwood Senior Living (owned by EBC)	East New York	80
Park House	Tremont, Bronx	248
Webster Residence	Tremont, Bronx	171
La Central	Melrose, Bronx	161
East Flatbush Safe Haven	East Flatbush, Brooklyn	110
Midwood Safe Haven	Midwood, Brooklyn	51
Scattered Site Apartments	Various	171
Queens Drop In Center	Ozone Park, Queens	n/a

=== The Times Square ===
(Times Square, Manhattan; 652 units)

This 15-story art deco building has a lobby with vaulted ceilings and a marble staircase. By the 1980s, the Times Square Hotel was in a state of decay. Its ceilings were caving in, its halls were dark and dangerous, and its tenants were drug addicts, homeless families and elderly people with no place else to go.

Rosanne Haggerty became obsessed with saving the run-down hotel at the corner of Eighth Avenue and 43rd Street and converting it into a home for street people, low-income workers and psychiatric survivors. Haggerty and other housing activists applied for every grant, tax credit and low-interest loan available, won the support of corporate and community leaders and sold Mayor David Dinkins on their vision.

In 1994, the restored Times Square Hotel re-opened, and today houses 652 residents. Supportive social services are provided by the Center for Urban Community Services (CUCS).

=== The Prince George ===
(Midtown Manhattan; 416 units)

For decades the Prince George Hotel, with its burnished wood, lavishly detailed ceilings and classical columns welcomed visitors to Edith Wharton's New York. But then the hotel declined, becoming one of New York's notorious welfare hotels of the Bowery in the 1980s, when it housed about 1,600 people. The city closed it in 1989.

Today, the hotel on East 28th Street has reopened, combining aspects of both of its previous incarnations. It once again provides housing to the formerly homeless, but the number of residents is far less, and they are able to take advantage of supportive services within the building. At the same time, the Prince George has been restored to its former glory in what now has become one of Manhattan's official historic districts, Madison Square North, with particular attention to its once-again elegant ballroom, a grand gathering place. Supportive social services are provided by the Center for Urban Community Services (CUCS).

==== Prince George Ballroom ====
In 2004, Breaking Ground launched an ambitious project to restore the 5,000-square-foot (460 m^{2}) ballroom and adjacent former Hunt Room. The project presented an opportunity to offer needed training and jobs. Breaking Ground, working with four other non-profit groups, arranged for at-risk youth, high school students interested in restoration arts, architectural students, and individuals with HIV/AIDS to work on the renovation. Students at the Parsons School designed and built an entry foyer and gallery space in what had been the Hunt Room. Faced with an area that was beyond restoration, the students developed an airy, modern space that is now the World Monuments Fund Gallery, which serves as a special exhibition and events space.

=== The Christopher ===
(Chelsea, Manhattan; 207 units)

In 2000, the YMCA sold its second building for $9 million to Breaking Ground. The building, which is entered through 202 West 24th Street, once housed the Y's transient residences. In July 2000 the group began a $23 million transformation of the 24th Street building into 207 residences for homeless people and low-income single adults - those earning up to $32,640 a year - as well as teenagers at risk of becoming homeless. Supportive social services are provided by CUCS.

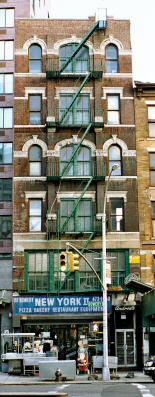
The Andrews

=== The Andrews ===
(The Bowery, Manhattan; 146 units)

Breaking Ground purchased The Andrews, a dingy century-old building, in 2002 for $2.5 million. The renovation added three floors to accommodate 136 residential units and allow for a medical team to be housed on the premises. A transitional housing program, residents do not pay rent and case managers assist them in attaining permanent housing.

=== The Betty Ruth and Milton B. Hollander Foundation Center ===
(Hartford, Connecticut; 70 units)

Breaking Ground renovated the property at 410 Asylum, known as The Capitol Building, and created 70 mixed-income apartments there, along with space for street-level retail businesses. The rehabilitation of the Hollander Foundation Center incorporates sustainable design elements that enhance energy efficiency and reduce the building's carbon footprint. Green elements include a high-efficiency heating system, low-flow fixtures, an energy-efficient lighting plan, EnergyStar appliances and plans for a green roof. Breaking Ground now incorporates green in all of its projects in Connecticut and New York.

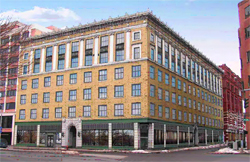
The Hollander Foundation Center

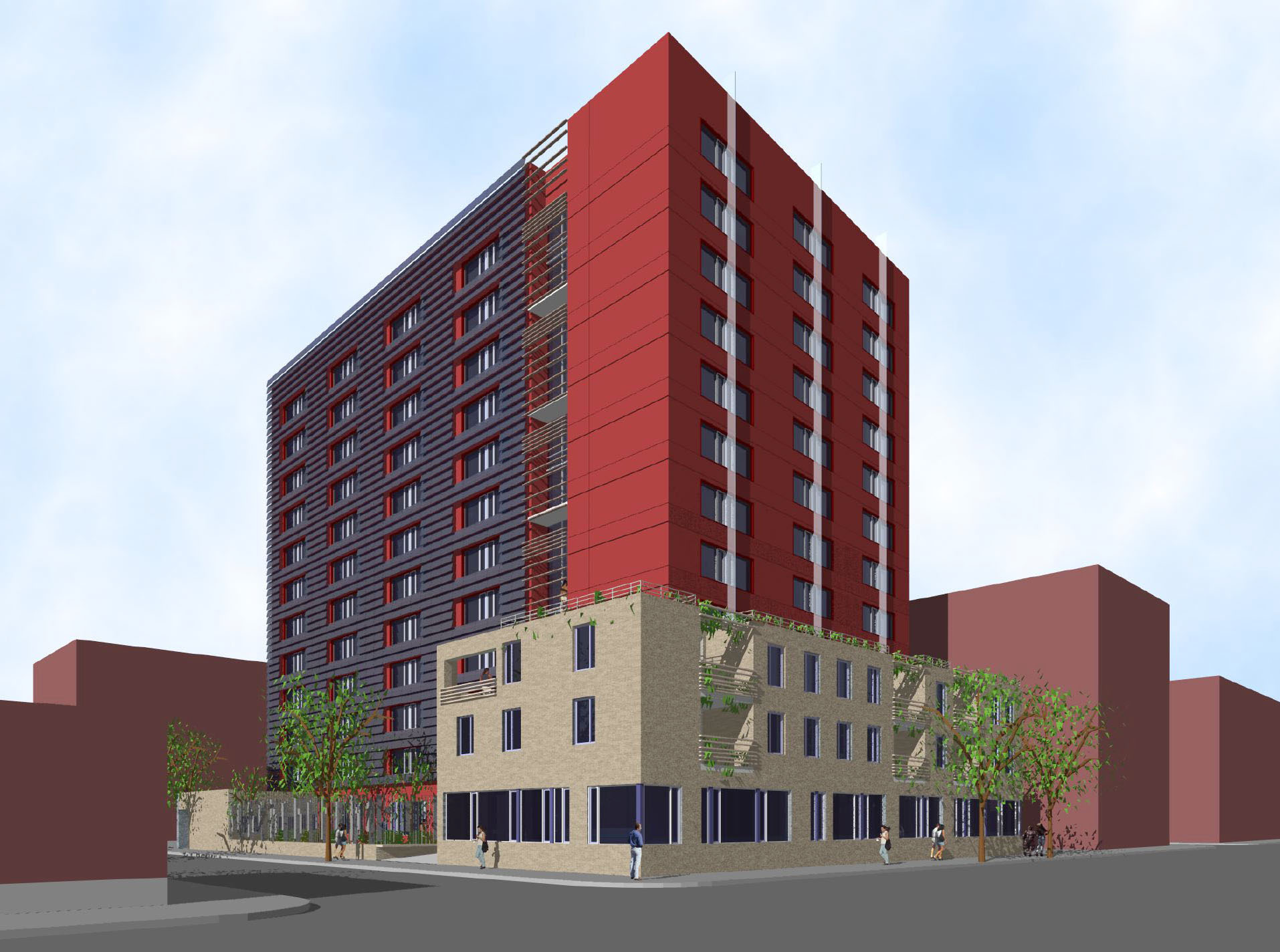
The Lee

NEF provided funding for the project through Breaking Ground's allocation of low-income housing tax credits and historic tax credits, both stemming from federal programs designed to encourage private-sector investment in affordable housing.

The upper floors of the former office building were converted into 70 affordable mixed-income apartments. The street level storefronts, comprising 13,000 square feet (1,200 m^{2}) were also restored. About 80 percent of the apartments at the center are rented to those with incomes below 60 percent of the area's median income. Rents start at $765 per month. The remaining two-bedroom units will be rented at market rate, $1,400 per month.

Construction was completed in the summer of 2009.

=== The Lee ===
(Lower East Side, Manhattan; 263 units)

In 2007, the New York City Department of Housing Preservation and Development (HPD), in cooperation with Breaking Ground, began construction on a $59 million, 99,000-square-foot (9,200 m^{2}) supportive housing complex at 133 Pitt Street on the Lower East Side that will be Manhattan's first such LEED Silver development. Designed by Kiss + Cathcart Architects (Brooklyn Health House, Stillwell Avenue Subway Terminal), The Lee, named after one of the project's major financiers, will offer affordable housing and on-site social services for 263 residents. All social services are provided on-site by CUCS. 104 units are reserved for the homeless, 105 are for low-income residents, and 54 units are for young adults that are at high risk for homelessness. Green design features include an efficient condensing boiler, a green roof, efficient water fixtures, high-performance lighting, and low-irrigation landscaping. HPD and Breaking Ground expect a minimum of twenty percent savings in utility expenses.

=== Montrose Veterans Residence ===
(Westchester County, New York; 96 units)

Renovation of a vacant hospital building on the Montrose campus began November 27, the result of a partnership between the VA and Breaking Ground. By Fall 2008, the first phase of the project was completed accommodating 96 veterans.

The $700,000 renovation included asbestos removal, electrical and plumbing upgrades, a new fire-alarm system and architectural changes to create individual rooms and common rooms in the post-World War II-era building. Most residents were referred by the Montrose VA's Domiciliary Care for Homeless Veterans Program after a four-month rehabilitation program there. Others came from shelters and streets in New York City and Westchester County as well as veterans returning from the wars in Iraq and Afghanistan who were facing imminent homelessness.

During their nine- to 12-month stays, veterans also received support to find employment, manage their physical and mental health conditions, reconnect with family, and later move into their own apartment.

As a member of the Patriot Housing Initiative, the program helped drastically reduce the number of chronically homeless veterans in Westchester County, to the point that the a program of its size and scope was no longer needed, and the program closed in September 2017.

=== The Schermerhorn ===
(Downtown, Brooklyn; 217 units)

This eleven-story, 217-unit apartment building in Brooklyn's Boerum Hill neighborhood was completed in 2008. Units are for households earning under 60% of the area's median income, and half are reserved for the homeless or people with special needs. Schermerhorn House is surrounded by luxury condominiums and townhouses, so developers Breaking Ground and The Actors Fund knew good design was vital to winning local support. The developers chose Polshek Partnership, a New York firm. Polshek's design — which has a glass façade and a rooftop garden — is meant to fit in with the surrounding buildings. Due to site restrictions, part of the project had to be built atop a subway tunnel, a complex engineering challenge. Instead of making the north wall out of heavy masonry, the architects used textured glass, which is lighter and allowed for less costly support trusses. Polshek, like many prominent firms working in this field, charged a reduced fee. Supportive social services are provided by CUCS and The Actors Fund. The Schermerhorn was participating site in the 2014 Open House New York Weekend.

=== Other current facilities ===
- The Aurora (Midtown Manhattan; 178 units)
- The Brook (South Bronx; 190 units)
- The Domenech (Brownsville, Brooklyn; 72 units; opened 2011)
- The Hegeman (Brownsville, Brooklyn; 161 units; opened 2012)
- Cedarwoods (Willimantic, CT; 60 units; opened 2012)
- Eastman Commons (Rochester, NY; 80 units; opened 2013)

== Facilities under construction ==
As of November 2019 Breaking Ground has 3 projects with 785 units in development.

Building	Location	Number of units
Edwin's Place	Brownsville, Brooklyn	125
Betances	Mott Haven, Bronx	152
90 Sands	Dumbo, Brooklyn	508

== See also ==
- HomeGround Services
- Homelessness in New York City
- Homelessness in the United States
