= Louise Blanchard Bethune =

American architect

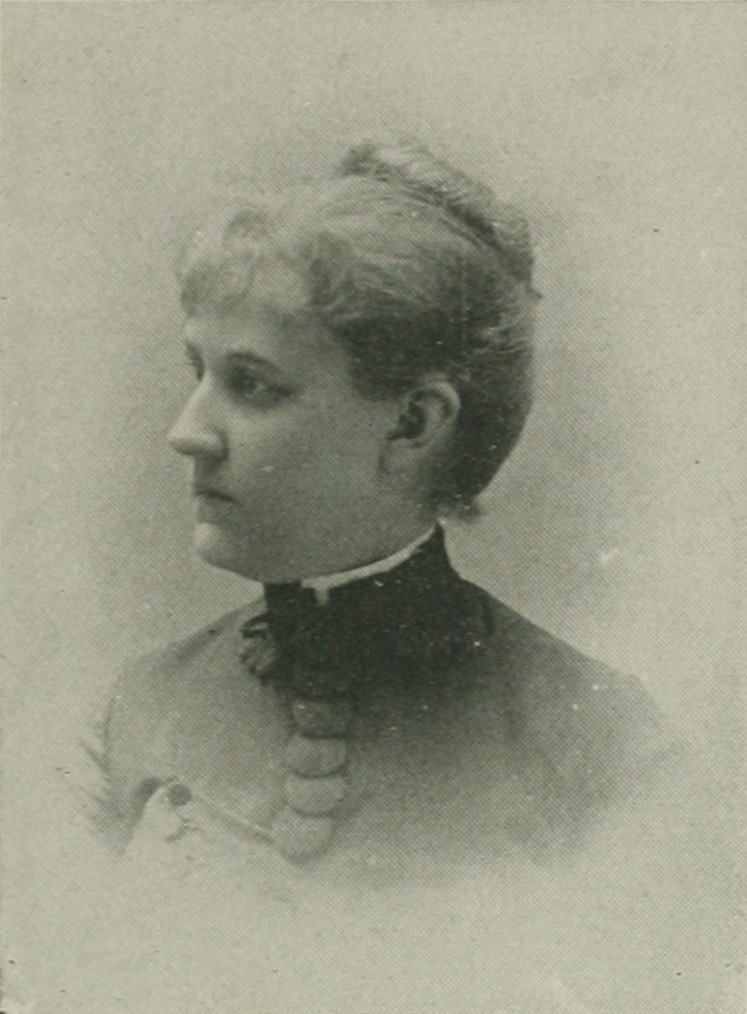
- Born: Jennie Louise Blanchard; July 21, 1856; Waterloo, New York, US
- Died: December 18, 1913 (aged 57); Buffalo, New York, US
- Occupation: Architect
- Spouse: Robert A. Bethune (m. 1881)
- Children: 1
- Practice: Buffalo, New York
- Buildings: Hotel Lafayette

Louise Blanchard Bethune (July 21, 1856 – December 18, 1913) was the first American woman known to have worked as a professional architect. She was born in Waterloo, New York. Blanchard worked primarily in Buffalo, New York with her husband at Bethune, Bethune & Fuchs.

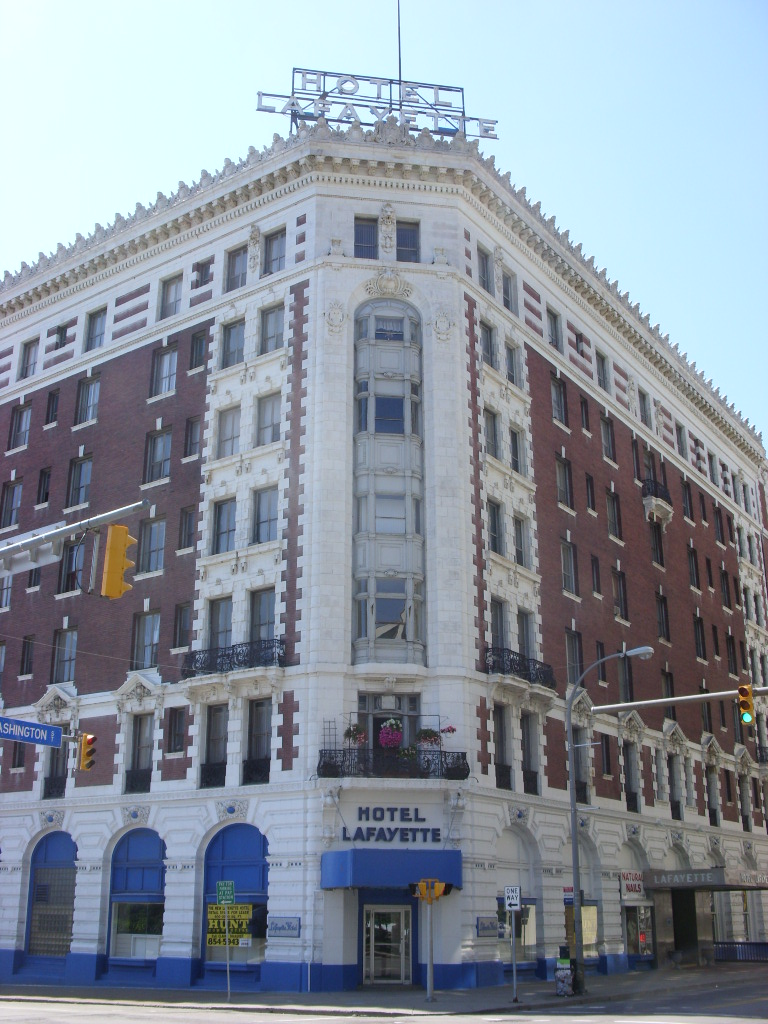
Hotel Lafayette

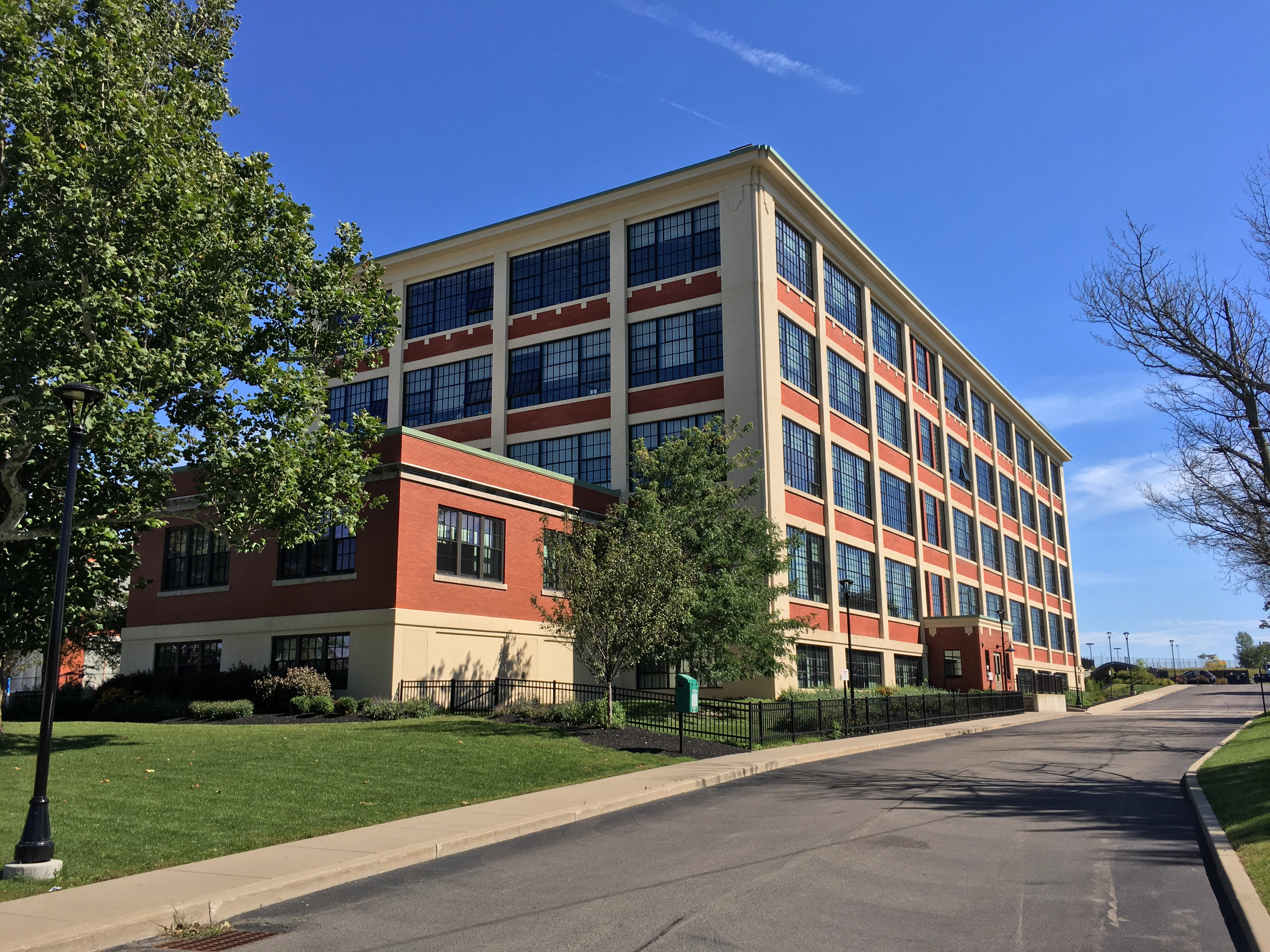
Buffalo Meter Company Building, renamed Bethune Hall to honor Bethune, although she was not the building's architect

Her largest project was the Hotel Lafayette, including its expansion project, but she also worked on many other residential and commercial projects, including many public school buildings. The Buffalo Meter Company Building was renamed Bethune Hall in her honor by the University at Buffalo.

== Personal life ==
Bethune was born Jennie Louise Blanchard in Waterloo, New York in 1856. The Blanchard family moved to Buffalo, New York when she was a child, which is 111 miles west of Seneca Falls, the birthplace of the women's suffrage movement in the United States. She graduated from Buffalo Central High School in 1874. She made a remark explaining how her interest in architecture was first playful but soon became an absorbing interest.

In 1881, she wed Canadian Robert A. Bethune (1855-1915), also an architect. Together they had one son, Charles William Bethune, in 1883.

Bethune reportedly purchased the first woman's bicycle to go on sale in Buffalo. She was an active member of the Women's Wheel and Athletic Club. According to the Buffalo Spree, Bethune had feminist leanings.

Bethune retired in 1908 and died on December 18, 1913, at the age of 57.

== Career ==
Bethune planned on going to architecture school at Cornell. Instead, in 1876, she took a job working as a draftsman at Richard A. Waite and F.W. Caulkins, well-known architects in Buffalo, New York.

In 1881, after five years in Waite's office, she opened an independent office with her husband, Robert Bethune, in Buffalo, earning herself the title of the nation's first professional woman architect, which she announced at the Ninth Congress of the Association for the Advancement of Women. In 1891, William Fuchs became their third firm partner, and the three of them did everything from small residential to larger institutional buildings.

Bethune was elected a member of the Western Association of Architects (WAA) in 1885. She later served a term as a vice president of the W.A.A. She was named the first female associate of the American Institute of Architects (A.I.A.) in 1888 and in 1889, she became its first female fellow.

In 1891, she refused to compete in a design competition for the Women's Building at the World's Columbian Exposition in Chicago because men were paid $10,000 to design buildings for the fair while the women got only $1,000. She believed that complete emancipation meant equal pay for equal work, and she didn't want to support endeavours that didn't support her views or values, but she also explained how she understands that as a businesswoman, she won't make money if she comes off as an antagonizing suffragette.

Bethune designed mostly industrial and public buildings. She disliked working on residential projects because they paid poorly. Her best-known design and masterpiece is the neoclassical Hotel Lafayette, which was commissioned for $1 million and completed in 1904. It has since undergone a $35 million restoration, completed in 2012 by developer Rocco Termini. The Bethune firm also designed the Denton, Cottier & Daniels music store, one of the first buildings in the United States to utilize a steel frame and poured concrete slabs. Three other Bethune buildings are still standing today: the Iroquois Door Plant Company warehouse; the large Chandler Street Complex for the Buffalo Weaving Company; and the Witkop and Holmes Headquarters (1901), which was listed on the National Register of Historic Places in 2014. She was involved of the design of one hundred fifty buildings in the Buffalo and New England areas during her career.

== Work ==
Bethune & Bethune designed 18 public schools in the term of the firm's lifetime, beginning in 1881 for the Buffalo Public School District. The firm paid special attention to segregating children by their ages, indoor plumbing, and including egress stairs for fire safety. These standards are still used today and the Bethunes pioneered these ideas. In 1893, Bethune commented that she does not specialize in educational design, because she felt as the first woman architect she should demonstrate her understanding of all types of architectural design.

Many of the buildings her firm worked on were historically derivative, which was the standard practice at the time. A lot of their work was Romanesque in character. The firm really focused on local projects, and none of them placed Bethune on a national level.

In the early 1900s, Bethune got the opportunity to design the Lafayette Hotel, located in downtown Buffalo. The building is a Renaissance Revival hotel of seven-stories. The hotel also features hot and cold water in every bathroom, and includes a telephone in every room. This hotel was praised as one of the most magnificent hotels in the country when it opened in 1904. Bethune ended up ending her AIA membership and focusing solely on the Lafayette Hotel expansion project that soon followed its opening. Bethune also partnered with Nikola Tesla for this project.

Bethune's designs reflect her success in applying new scientific developments such as sanitation, ventilation, fire-proofing, and other functions which were challenging architects during the late 19th-century, which was experiencing rapid urbanization and industrial development at this time.

== Influence on women ==
Louise Bethune, being the first woman architect, understood her role as a feminist and her role as a businesswoman. Although Bethune, Bethune & Fuchs worked on many residential projects, she believed that women architects should not pursue these projects because it limits them from being chosen for bigger, commercial projects, and men were most likely to be chosen for these. She didn't want women to be pigeonholed into doing only residential design. Also, she believed in equal pay for equal work and many residential projects did not pay as well as commercial projects.

Equal pay for equal work was something she strongly advocated for women architects, and didn't take projects just for prestige. This was her guiding principle, and she gave a speech on to the Buffalo chapter of the Women's Educational and Industrial Union on March 6, 1891, explaining her values as to why she refused to compete to design the women's pavilion at the 1893 World's Columbian Exposition in Chicago. Bethune only saw herself as doing the work of a proper architect, and believed her gender shouldn't define her accomplishments. Although she didn't define herself as a feminist, she did lean into it with her optimistic views that more women will become architects in time. She was rather an advocate for the architecture profession being available for women rather than an apologizing for the limitations women suffered. Her activism was design itself.

Bethune was a member of the Daughters of the American Revolution.

Her career and advocacy for women in architecture helped pave the way for generations of women architects including Lois Lilley Howe, Josephine Wright Chapman, Sophia Hayden, Mary Nevan Gannon, Alice Hands, Julia Morgan, and Beverly Greene. By the time Bethune died in December 1915, nearly 200 women were practicing architecture in the United States.

== Legacy ==
The former Buffalo Meter Company Building was renamed Bethune Hall in her honor, when it housed the Department of Art along with the School of Architecture and Planning of the University at Buffalo. This building was purchased in June 2011 by the Ciminelli Real Estate Corporation, who redeveloped the building into 87 apartments with Carmina Wood Morris, PC. Residents began to move into the building in July 2013, and it was renamed Bethune Lofts. The building was listed on the National Register of Historic Places, received LEED Silver certification, and received the Preservation League of NYS Excellence in Historic Preservation Award in 2014.

In 2013, Bethune's grave was given a new marker, which states,
"JENNIE LOUISE
BLANCHARD BETHUNE
JULY 21, 1856
DECEMBER 18, 1915"

She is interred in Buffalo's Forest Lawn Cemetery.

== See also ==
- Women in architecture
