= Sibley and Holmwood Candy Factory and Witkop and Holmes Headquarters =

- U.S. National Register of Historic Places
- New York State Register of Historic Places
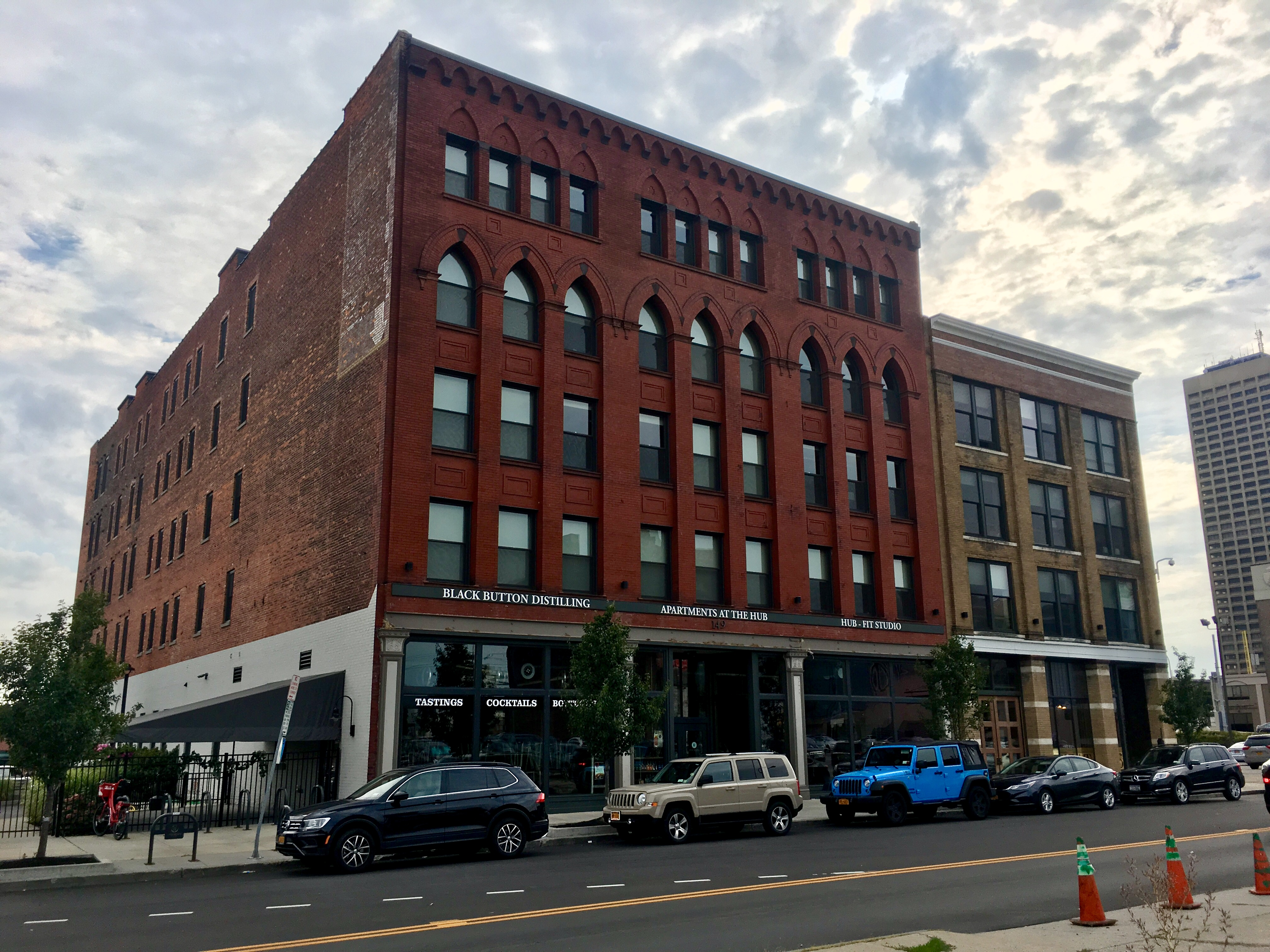
- Sibley and Holmwood Candy Factory and Witkop and Holmes Headquarters, September 2019

- Location within New York Location within the United States
- Location: 149 & 145 Swan Street, Buffalo, New York
- Coordinates: 42°52′50″N 78°52′13″W
- Area: .49 acres (0.20 ha)
- Built: 1896, 1902; 1901, 1906, 1908
- Architects: Lansing and Bierl; Bethune, Bethune, and Fuchs
- Architectural style: Gothic
- NRHP reference No.: 14000398
- NYSRHP No.: 02940.003090, 02940.024352

Significant dates
- Added to NRHP: July 11, 2014
- Designated NYSRHP: May 20, 2014

Sibley and Holmwood Candy Factory and Witkop and Holmes Headquarters, also known as the Weed & Company Building, are two connected historic commercial buildings located in downtown Buffalo, Erie County, New York, United States. The Sibley & Holmwood Candy Factory (149 Swan Street) was built in 1896 and is a five-story, nine-bay-wide brick commercial block with late-Gothic detailing. It features Gothic window arches, decorative cast-iron columns on the storefront, and corbelled cornice. The Witkop & Holmes Headquarters (145 Swan Street) was designed by the architectural firm Bethune, Bethune & Fuchs and built in 1901. It is a four-story, three-bay-wide brick commercial block. Both buildings have flat roofs. The building has been renovated to house loft apartments.

It was listed on the National Register of Historic Places in 2014.

== Gallery ==
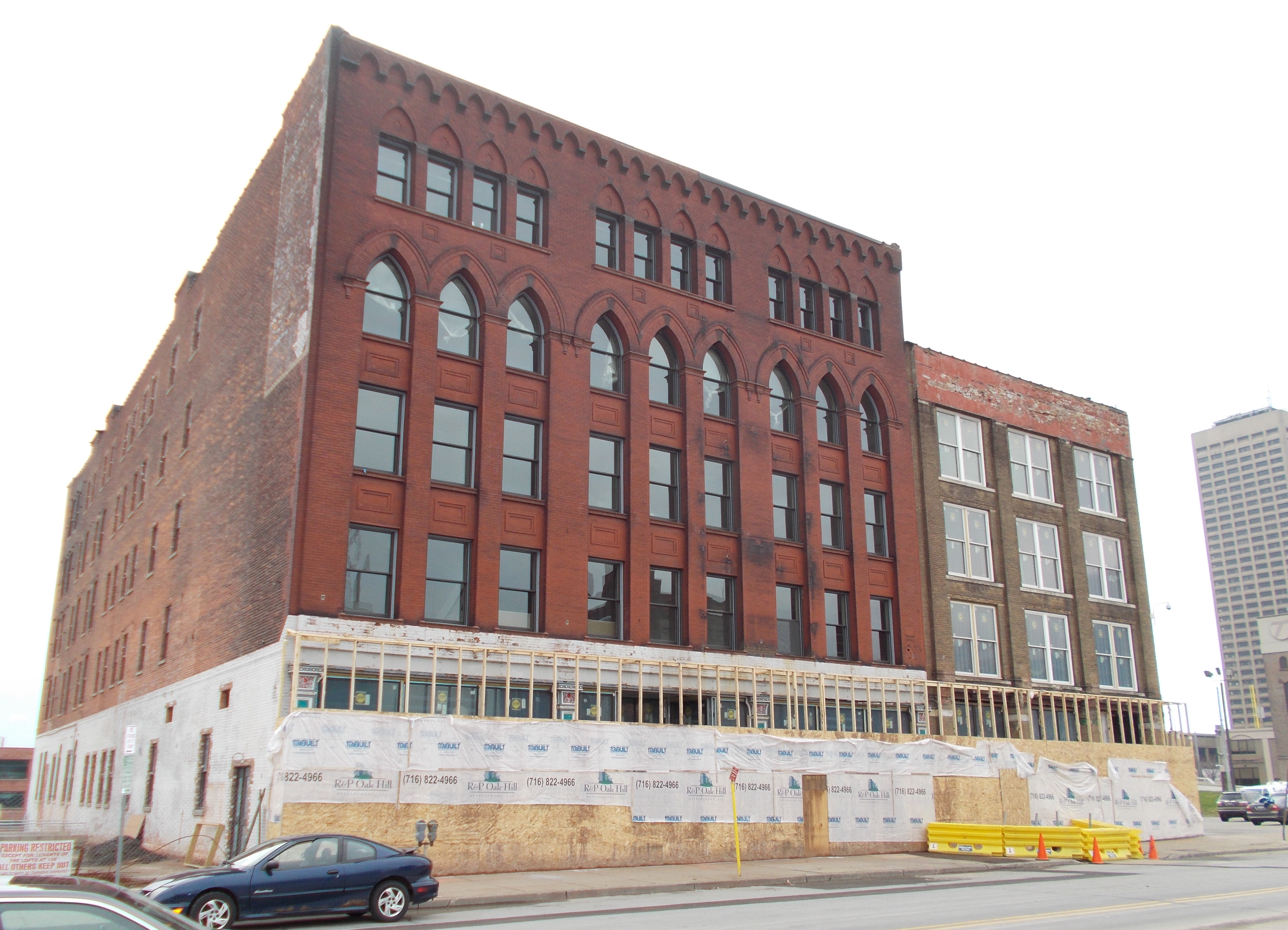
Sibley and Holmwood Candy Factory and Witkop and Holmes Headquarters, April 2014
