= Tran Dinh Truong =

Vietnamese-American businessman

Trường Đình Trần (January 5, 1932 – May 6, 2012), was a Vietnamese-American businessman and hotelier. Starting in the 1970s, Tran owned several New York City hotels that became noted for their problems with crime, building safety, and cleanliness.

== Life in Vietnam ==
Tran was born in Hà Tĩnh province in north-central Vietnam to a Roman Catholic family. He married Ngu Thi in 1950 and had four children with her. Sometime after 1954, Tran and his father were imprisoned by North Vietnamese authorities for two years. After his release, he moved to South Vietnam and had children with four other women.

Tran was the principal owner of the Vishipco Line, the largest shipping company in South Vietnam in the 1970s. As a shipowner, he earned millions of dollars hauling cargo for the United States military. His actions during the last day of the Fall of Saigon have been the subject of debate. Tran stated that he used his company's resources, including 24 commercial ships and hundreds of trucks, to aid in the evacuation of thousands of South Vietnamese civilians and military personnel to escape from Vietnam. He let his ships, inclusive the Truong Xuan (with Captain Pham Ngoc Luy) carried free more than 3,000 Vietnamese fleeing Saigon after the Communist invasion. He claimed that his ships also helped evacuate thousands of American military personnel and civilians; Richard Armitage, the American official who oversaw the U.S. naval evacuation, disputed this as false because all U.S. military personnel had already evacuated and American civilians did not evacuate on merchant ships.

Tran left Vietnam on April 30, 1975, the day that Saigon fell to the communists. Tran boarded one of his eleven ships and traveled to the United States with two suitcases of gold.

== Hotel business ==
He began his hotel business in New York City in 1975, first with the Hotel Opera single-room occupancy on the Upper West Side in Manhattan. He later took over Midtown's Hotel Carter in 1977, which went on to develop a reputation as America's "dirtiest hotel". Tran purchased the Hotel Kenmore on 23rd Street in 1985 for $7.9 million. The hotel was seized from Tran by the US Marshals Service in 1994 because of deplorable conditions and rampant drug crime within the building; this was the largest federal seizure of property related to drug charges in U.S. history. In 1988, he purchased the Times Square Hotel; the hotel was seized by the city in January 1990 for its numerous safety code violations. He also owned the Hotel Lafayette in Buffalo, New York.

== Personal life ==
After the September 11, 2001 terrorist attacks on the United States he contributed $2 million of his personal funds to the American Red Cross Disaster Relief Fund and in 2003, the Asian American Federation honored his actions. In 1984 during the famine in Ethiopia, he also purchased two helicopters valued at around 3.2 million dollars for the hunger relief organization in Ethiopia. In August 2005, he donated $100,000 to the victims of Hurricane Katrina.

Tran regularly attended mass at Holy Cross Church. In May 2004, he was awarded a Golden Torch Award, by the Vietnamese American National Gala in Washington, D.C. Mr. Tran was also on the Board of Directors of The United Way of New York City.

In 2007, Tran began to suffer from cardiovascular disease. He died on May 6, 2012.

Tran's complex family life led to a protracted legal battle over his $100 million estate.
