= Hotel Carter =

Former hotel in Manhattan, New York

Coordinates: 40°45′26.3″N 73°59′18″W

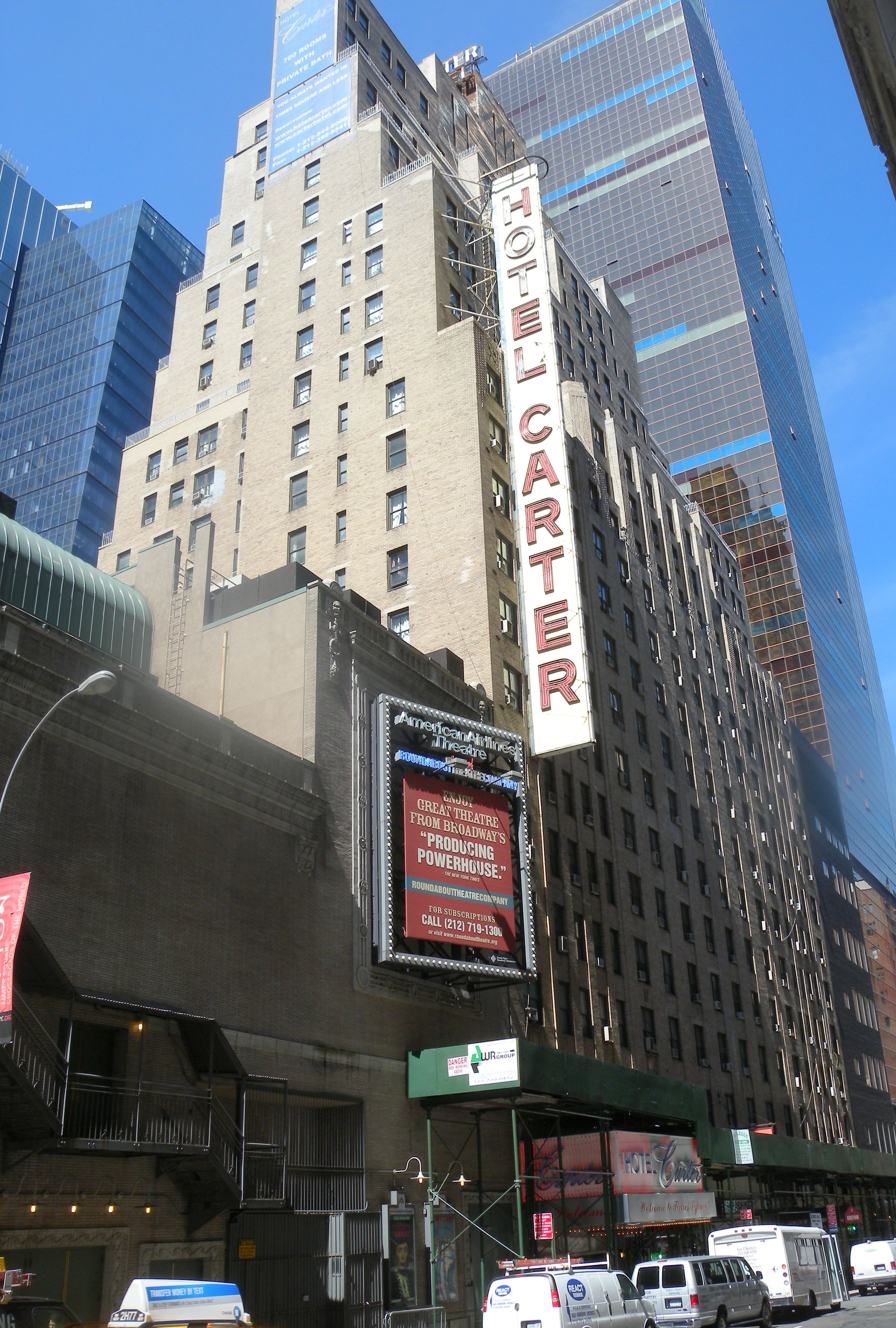
- view from the east on 43rd Street

General information
- Location: 250 West 43rd Street, New York, NY 10036; United States
- Opening: 1930
- Closed: 2015
- Owner: Joseph Chetrit

Technical details
- Floor count: 25

Design and construction
- Architect: Emery Roth

Other information
- Number of rooms: 700

The Hotel Carter is a defunct hotel at 250 West 43rd Street, near Times Square, in the Midtown Manhattan neighborhood of New York City, New York, U.S. Opened in June 1930 as the Dixie Hotel, the 25-story structure originally extended from 43rd Street to 42nd Street, although the wing abutting 42nd Street has since been demolished. The hotel originally contained a bus terminal at its ground level, which was closed in 1957, as well as a bar and restaurant immediately above it. The upper stories originally contained 1,000 rooms but were later downsized to 700 rooms.

The hotel was developed by the Uris Buildings Corporation, which announced plans for the site in September 1928. The Bowery Savings Bank foreclosed on the hotel in 1931 and acquired it in March 1932, operating it for the next decade. In 1942, the Dixie became part of the Carter Hotels chain, which rehabilitated the hotel several times. The hotel was renamed the Carter in October 1976 in an attempt to rehabilitate its image. Businessman Tran Dinh Truong operated the Carter from 1977 until his death in 2012, after which GF Management took over. The Carter was sold to Joseph Chetrit in 2015. He closed the hotel, with plans to renovate it. As of 2025, it remains vacant.

While in operation, the Hotel Carter gained a negative reputation due to the crimes that occurred there, as well as its general uncleanliness. At least four murders occurred in the hotel. In addition, the Hotel Carter was cited as being America's "dirtiest hotel" and a place of squalor and crime.

== Description ==
When it opened in 1930, the Dixie Hotel contained a thousand rooms (later downsized to 700 rooms). The hotel had been planned as a 22-story building with either 650 or 700 guestrooms. The plans had also included an underground bus terminal. The hotel was largely located on 43rd Street, although it also had an alternate entrance through a two-story building on 42nd Street.

=== Bus terminal ===
The hotel originally contained a bus depot, which opened in 1930 and operated until 1957. The terminal occupied the entire ground floor of the hotel, although its loading platform and waiting room were 5 feet (1.5 m) below street level. The facility was accessed by two arrival and two departure ramps, which could accommodate up to 40 buses per hour; these ramps led to both 42nd and 43rd Streets. The center of the terminal contained a bus turntable with a diameter of 35 feet. Twelve loading slips were arranged around the turntable. The terminal handled 350 buses daily during peak summer seasons.

Buses arriving at the terminal would drive onto the turntable, which would then rotate to the proper slip. The center of the turntable was 4 inches (100 mm) below the rim, preventing buses from rolling off the turntable by accident. Bus drivers pulled forward into the slip, allowing passengers to alight and board at the widest part of the loading platform. To prevent buses from rolling backward onto the turntable, each loading slip sloped 2 inches (51 mm) downward from the turntable. The loading platform itself was about 6 inches (150 mm) above the slip, allowing level boarding. Buses leaving the terminal would reverse onto the turntable, which would rotate toward the exit ramp. A dispatcher used an electronic signaling device to control all of the buses' movements, and the dispatcher also announced the departure of each bus.

The loading platform wrapped around each of the bus slips. Two sets of doors, one on either side of the terminal, led from the loading area to the terminal's waiting room. The terminal was arranged so all slips were within 100 feet (30 m) of the waiting area. The waiting room had a cafe, newsstands, ticket booths, and elevators leading to the hotel's lobby. Both the waiting room and the loading area were heated using a forced draft system. Ventilation openings were placed at the rear of each slip, near the buses' exhaust pipes.

=== Nightclub and theater ===
The hotel's first story contained the Dixie Lounge Bar, a nightclub that opened in 1942 and was decorated in the Southern Colonial style. The space was designed by Jac Lessman and could be accessed from the lobby, the dining room, and directly from the street. The room was surrounded by a four-foot-high brick wainscoting, and the front wall contained white window shutters and ivy-filled planting boxes. In addition, the columns were decorated to resemble trees. The nightclub, along with the adjacent Plantation Room restaurant, could fit a combined 500 people.

The Bert Wheeler Theater opened at the hotel in 1966, ten steps above its entrance. The theater was variously cited as having 220 or 225 seats; it occupied the former Plantation Room and measured 60 by 45 feet (18 by 14 m). A circular bar, 50 feet (50 ft) in circumference, adjoined the theater and was behind glass doors; it was closed during performances, except for during a twenty-minute intermission. Food was served in the Terrace Room, the hotel's restaurant.

== History ==
=== Development and early years ===
Harris H. Uris, who cofounded the Uris Buildings Corporation with his son Percy, acquired the land lots at 241 West 42nd Street and 250–262 West 43rd Street in September 1928. The acquisition gave the Uris family a site of 16,500 square feet (1,530 m^{2}), on which the family planned to build a 25-story hotel with 700 guestrooms. In May 1929, the New York State Title and Mortgage Company gave Percy and his brother Harold a $2.2 million construction loan for the Hotel Dixie. Excavation for the new structure began the same month with the removal of six old tenements from the site. Tenements at 250–262 West 43rd Street were razed, along with a two-story taxpayer at 241 West 42nd Street. The Uris brothers acquired a four-story building at 266 West 43rd Street in August 1929. This land lot was separated from the hotel's site by another building at 264 West 43rd Street, (Note: The building at 264 West 43rd Street was used by the Loft Inc. store at the hotel's base, then sold to Jacobowitz & Katz in 1951.) which belonged to the Schulte family. At the time, work on the hotel's foundations was underway. Several floors of steelwork had been added to the hotel by mid-October 1929.

The Uris brothers leased the storefronts to various businesses, including a laundry, as well as a beauty parlor and barber shop. A concession was also awarded for the hat rack in the Dixie Hotel's lobby. Scarr Transportation Service was hired to managed the bus terminal, and the restaurant space in the terminal was leased to Loft, Inc. Two bus operators began using a temporary bus terminal on the site on December 9, 1929, and group of transportation executives formally dedicated the Dixie Hotel's Central Union Bus Terminal on February 14, 1930. The Dixie Hotel was originally supposed to open on May 1, 1930, and the bus terminal was planned to formally open at the same time. That month, M.C. Levine was recorded as having incorporated the Hotel Dixie with 10,000 shares. The Bowery Savings Bank gave a $350,000 mortgage loan the same month to the Jerrold Holding Corporation, a holding company led by Harris Uris, which owned the hotel. This mortgage loan, along with four others on the site, were consolidated into a single lien totaling $1.85 million. The bus terminal formally opened in May 1930. The Hotel Dixie opened the next month, with S. Gregory Taylor as the operator and James M. Tait as the general manager.

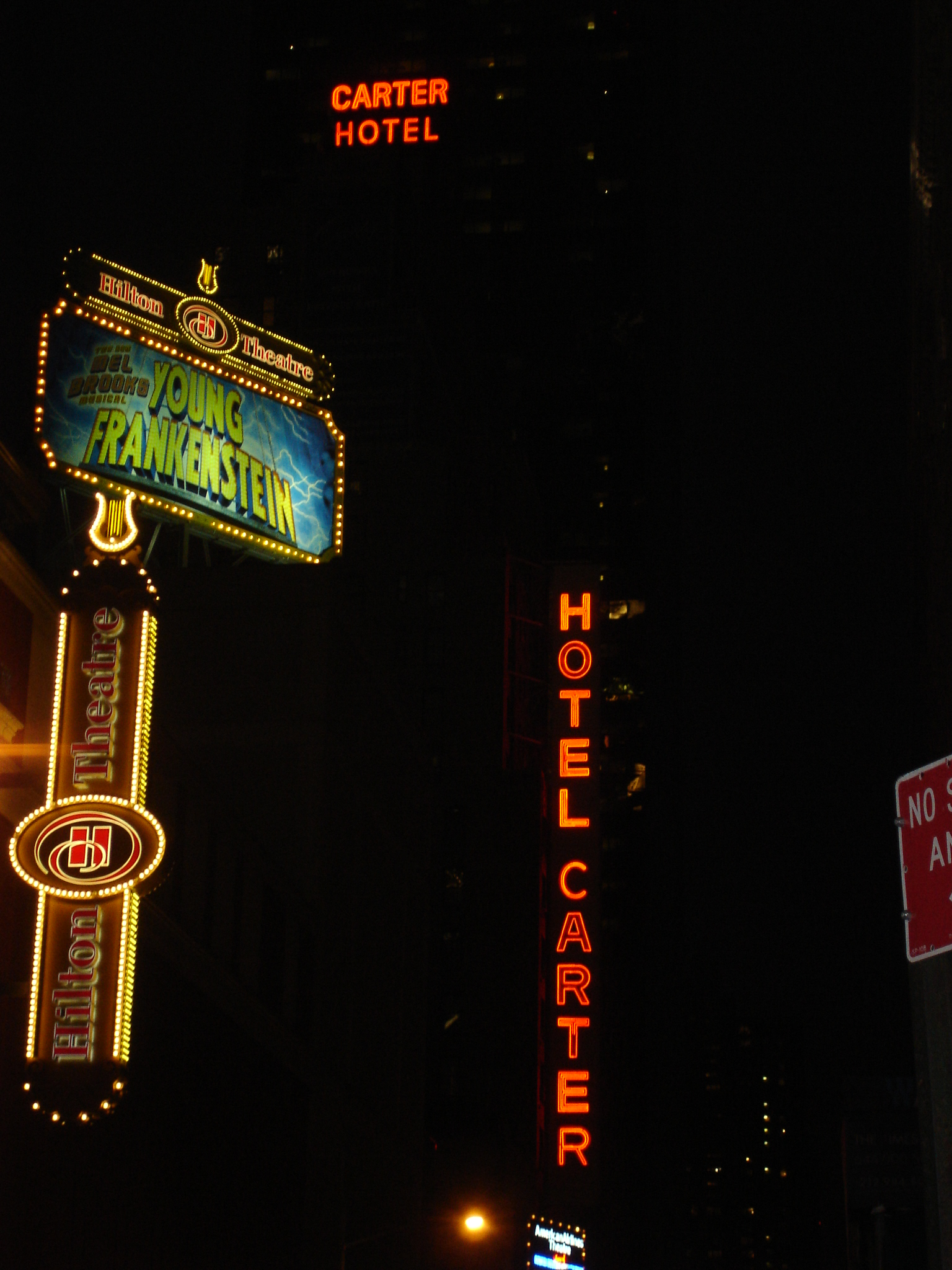
The Hotel Carter is located in the Theater District of Manhattan.

The Central Union Bus Terminal was known as the Short Line Bus Terminal by July 1931. That October, the Bowery Savings Bank moved to foreclose on the hotel's mortgage, for which the Jerrold Holding Corporation owed $1.98 million. A federal judge appointed the Irving Trust as a receiver, and James B. Regan, former proprietor of the Knickerbocker Hotel, was another appointed receiver. The Bowery Savings Bank scheduled a foreclosure auction for the Dixie but withdrew the planned auction in February 1932. The auction for the hotel was rescheduled to March 1932, at which point the Uris family owed the bank $2.06 million. At the time, the hotel was valued at $2.3 million. The bank ultimately bought the hotel for $1.8 million at the end of the month. In April 1932, the Southworth Management Corporation (headed by Roy S. Hubbell, former manager of the Hotel Commodore and the Hotel Belmont) took over the hotel's operation. Hubbell only managed the hotel for a short period; he died in October 1932 in his bedroom at the hotel. The hotel started hosting big bands in November 1933, when Art Kahn's band began performing there.

=== Carter Hotels operation ===
The Bowery Savings Bank sold the hotel in March 1942 to Kings Hotel Inc., subject to a mortgage of $1.125 million. The new owner was a subsidiary of the Carter Hotels chain, which planned to spend $200,000 on renovations. The project was to include refurbishing the lobby, installing a marquee, adding dance floors, and renovating half of the rooms. Carter Hotels took over management of the business that April. To accommodate executives and business couples who lived at the Dixie, its managers converted some rooms to studio apartments. Jac Lessman converted the bar into a nightclub named the Dixie Lounge Bar, which opened in September 1942 and featured live music. The hotel's restaurant became the Plantation Room, serving Southern food throughout the day. The hotel was planning to add another room for live performances by 1945. The Plantation Room began hosting live music shows in 1946, replacing what Billboard magazine called the "silly hat-nursery rhyme phase at this room". In the room's heyday, its performers included Al Trace's band and Teddy Powell's band. In addition to the musical acts, the hotel hosted "Miss Times Square" pageants every Sunday night. The Plantation Room stopped hosting shows in early 1947 because it was losing money.

Meanwhile, most of the bus lines that had served the Dixie Hotel's ground-level bus terminal relocated to the nearby Port Authority Bus Terminal after the latter opened in 1950. The Dixie terminal's operators had signed a ten-year lease for the space in 1947; the bus terminal ultimately closed in 1957, after most of the remaining bus lines relocated to the Port Authority. The Walter Ballard Company converted the Dixie Hotel's former bus terminal into a parking lot for the hotel's guests in 1961. The space included a secondary lobby with features such as a registration desk, baggage check-in area, and a communications system; according to The New York Times, drivers could contact the front desk via closed-circuit television and could summon a bellhop without going to the main lobby. In 1964, local civic group Broadway Association proposed demolishing the Dixie Hotel, as well as ten nearby theaters on 42nd Street, to make way for a large convention center between Seventh Avenue, 41st Street, Eighth Avenue, and 43rd Street. Carter Hotels finished renovating the Dixie Hotel in 1965; the project included restoring all 700 rooms, as well as adding a CCTV system and automated elevators.

By the mid-1960s, the hotel was managed by William Benson of Carter Hotels, who ran the hotel until his death in 1967. An off-Broadway venue, the Bert Wheeler Theater, opened at the hotel in October 1966 with the musical comedy Autumn's Here. The hotel's theater was renamed the Burstein Theater in 1973 after it began presenting Yiddish shows. During the 1970s, the Dixie began to decline along with the rest of Times Square. Carter Hotels allocated $250,000 for renovations and sign alteration in an effort to "clean up" Times Square. H.B. Cantor, president of the company, wanted to change the hotel's name to give one of the establishments in the chain a corporate identity; at the time, the company operated several additional hotels in the Northeast United States. At this time, the Dixie was renamed the Carter.

=== Tran ownership ===
==== 1970s and 1980s ====
Vietnamese businessman and former ship owner Tran Dinh Truong purchased the hotel in October 1977 for $1.5 million. He formed a holding company, Alphonse Hotel Corporation, to take title to the hotel. Upon acquiring the Carter, Tran closed the hotel's 42nd Street entrance and hired Walter Scheff as its general manager. The New York Times described the hotel at the time as an establishment that catered to "middle-class tourists [and] has suffered with the decline of the surrounding area", although the paper reported that the hotel was still losing money. Over the next three decades, many of Tran's children, grandchildren, and wives lived in the hotel. Tran's son Anthony recalled that his father had been proud of the building, despite "the rats and the roaches", because it had been Tran's personal property. The hotel's theater continued to operate through the 1980s, presenting such shows as an adaptation of Aesop's Fables in 1979 and the musical Ka-Boom! in 1980.

Although the Urban Development Corporation (UDC), an agency of the New York state government, had proposed redeveloping the area around a portion of West 42nd Street in 1981, the Carter Hotel was excluded from the project. The Carter was used as a welfare hotel during the 1980s, housing homeless families; the Times reported in 1984 that the area around the entrance was filled "with teen-agers and young children who play sidewalk games into the night". The city government paid $62.62 per night to house a family in a small single room. Nurses, charities, and social-services workers frequently visited the hotel, serving its homeless population. The Carter housed 190 families by December 1983, when it was cited for its "consistently low rate of compliance in correcting health and safety violations". After hotel officials failed to correct numerous building-code violations, the city government sued the hotel in 1983 and 1984; a judge found Tran in contempt of court.

The hotel's physical condition was so bad that the New York City government stopped referring homeless people there in 1984, and an official for the 42nd Street Redevelopment Corporation called it "Nightmare Alley". By the end of 1985, the number of homeless families in the Carter had declined from 300 to 61, and the hotel began to make an effort to attract tourists once again. The hotel continued to experience violence issues. New York City removed all homeless families from the Carter in 1988 due to difficulties with plumbing, electricity, security, and vermin. The conditions at the Carter and at Tran's other hotels had dissuaded the American Red Cross from opening a shelter there. The hotel's bar, known as Rose of Saigon, was closed in early 1989 after city officials found that crack cocaine was being sold openly at the bar. An official for the New York City Office of Midtown Enforcement called it the "worst bar" he had ever seen, saying that it reminded him "of the bar scene in the Star Wars movie with the worst dregs of the solar system gathered together".

==== 1990s to 2010s ====
The International Travellers Network leased two floors as a hostel in the late 1980s, and the Penthouse Hostel leased the 23rd and 24th floors of the Hotel Carter in July 1990. Despite the revitalization of Times Square in the 1990s, the Carter remained dilapidated in character. By 1994, the hotel was ranked as New York City's most dangerous hotel because of its high crime rate. The New York City Department of Buildings issued a building-code violation against the hotel in January 1998 after inspectors discovered bulging masonry on the facade. The hotel was temporarily closed in December 1998 because an emergency fire exit was damaged. That year, the Carter was used as a filming location for the motion picture Great Expectations, representating a seedy hotel.

The hotel was still dilapidated in the mid-2000s. According to The New York Times, guests variously reported problems with cleanliness, as well as equipment that sometimes did not work. Online travel company TripAdvisor ranked the hotel as the dirtiest in the United States in 2006, 2008, and 2009. Additionally, in January 2009, the United States District Court for the Southern District of New York sued the operators of the Carter and four other Midtown Manhattan hotels, alleging that each of the hotels violated the Americans with Disabilities Act of 1990 (ADA). Among the complaints were that the hotel's main entrance, public restrooms, registration desk, and guestrooms were all inaccessible to disabled guests. Tran's lawyer claimed that some rooms were already ADA-accessible and that a wheelchair lift at the main entrance had been temporarily removed to allow a carpet to be installed. The case was settled in November 2009.

Erwin M. Lumanglas, the manager of the hotel since 2006, renovated some of the rooms by 2010 at a cost of $5,000 per room. The hotel did not rank among the ten dirtiest hotels in the United States in 2010, but it was ranked fourth in the country during 2011. TripAdvisor stopped ranking the dirtiest hotels in the U.S. in 2012, but CNBC reported that guests continued to raise complaints about the hotel's cleanliness.

=== Sale and closure ===
Tran died in 2012, and the surviving members of his family fought over ownership of the hotel. John Cruz of GF Management took ownership of the hotel in April 2013 and renovated it. The New York Times reported at the time that the hotel had broken elevators; 40-year-old fire extinguishers; non-functional exit signs; no weekend doormen; "discarded hospital linens" atop beds; inadequate insurance; and overdue loans. GF Management made gradual modifications to make it more desirable for guests, starting with rectifying fifteen violations of city building codes. GF Management also increased the frequency of housekeeping services from every three days to every two days; renovating 30 fourth-floor room with art and IKEA furniture; and replacing mattresses in rooms with reports of bedbugs. Following GF Management's takeover of the Hotel Carter, the hotel's occupancy rates increased from 68 to 74 percent, and Cruz began charging room rates of $120 to $150 a night.

The hotel was offered for sale in early 2014 after an extensive renovation. The Wall Street Journal reported that the hotel could sell for as much as $170 million; hotel operators such as Highgate Holding and Morris Moinian expressed interest in buying the Carter. CNBC, which reported that the hotel could be sold for up to $180 million, said that a potential buyer would have to spend $100 million to $125 million on renovating the hotel further. The developer Joseph Chetrit won the right to buy the hotel in September 2014. A gentlemen's club that had been located in the hotel, Cheetah's, filed a lawsuit in December 2014 in an attempt to halt the hotel's sale to Chetrit. Chetrit finalized his acquisition in February 2015 and closed the hotel down. The Athene Annuity and Life Company gave Chetrit a $129 million loan for the renovations.

JPMorgan Chase provided a $152 million mezzanine loan in February 2018. JPMorgan Chase's loan replaced in August 2022 with $185 million in construction financing, provided by Mack Real Estate. The city government sued the hotel's owners in early 2024 to force Chetrit to disassemble the sidewalk shed outside the hotel, which had stood there for a decade. That September, the Chetrit Group defaulted on one of the hotel's mezzanine loans. Mack sued the Chetrit family in January 2025, claiming that the Chetrits owed $223 million and threatening to foreclose on the property. The city government separately sued the Chetrit family in July 2025, claiming that the hotel had incurred more than 150 building-code violations. The hotel was supposed to be auctioned off in May 2026, but the auction was halted due to objections from the property owners.

== Critical reception ==
In 1980, a writer for Newsday wrote that the hotel was a "large, un-self-conscious, family-oriented kind of place" with "simple and spotlessly clean" rooms. By the 2000s, media reports frequently criticized the hotel's cleanliness. For example, during July 2009, the Glenn Beck Program highlighted the reports of the filth and disrepair of the Carter Hotel, while USA Today wrote that the hotel was filled with "roaches, rats, black mold and stains of dubious origin". In 2009, the hotel topped TripAdvisor's U.S. list of dirtiest hotels for the third time in four years.

Despite the many complaints that the Hotel Carter received, the hotel remained popular among some guests, including students, foreigners, and budget tourists. In 2005, The New York Times wrote that the hotel "offers travelers a cheap room in an expensive city, and something more: an adventure". New York magazine wrote in 2014: "If you still want a touch of the vice-ridden Times Square of the '60s and '70s, consider spending a night at the Hotel Carter."

== Deaths ==
The hotel has recorded several homicides. A 25-day-old infant was beaten to death at the hotel in November 1983; her father, a hotel resident, was charged with murder and child abuse. In 1987, a woman was killed by defenestration after witnesses heard arguing from room 1604. The hotel's night manager was killed in July 1999 during a brawl near the front desk; a clerk who lived at the hotel was charged with the night manager's murder. In August 2007, a housekeeper found the body of aspiring model Kristine Yitref, wrapped in plastic garbage bags and hidden under a bed in room 608; sex offender Clarence Dean was charged with her homicide.
