= James A. Johnson (architect) =

American architect

- Born: October 7, 1865; Brewerton, New York
- Died: April 5, 1939 (aged 73); Buffalo, New York
- Occupation: Architect
- Practice: Johnson & Marling; Esenwein & Johnson
- Buildings: Ellicott Square Building, The Calumet, Hotel Lafayette, Lafayette High School, Niagara Mohawk Building, United Office Building

James Addison Johnson (October 7, 1865 – April 5, 1939) was an American architect known for his design of various architectural landmarks in Buffalo, New York, and his use of decorative work that many consider a foreshadowing of art deco design.

== Early life ==
John Addison Johnson was born October 7, 1865, in Brewerton, New York, near Syracuse, New York, the son of Garrison Barrett Johnson and Katherine Eliza (née Beckwith) Johnson.

== Career ==
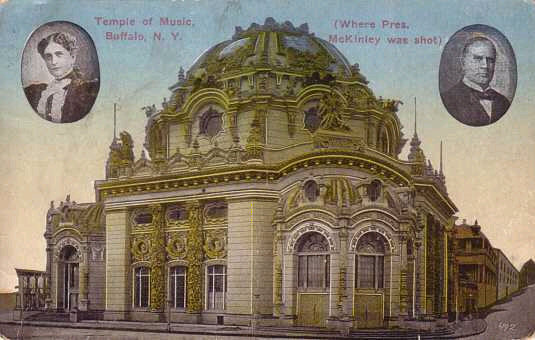
Temple of Music at 1901 Pan-American Exposition in Buffalo

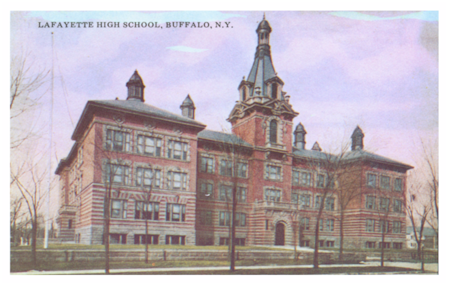
Lafayette High School in Buffalo, 1901

Johnson apprenticed and partnered with prominent Western New York architect Edward Austin Kent and later with Central New York architect Silsbee & Marling. He also worked for Richard Morris Hunt firm and in 1890, he joined the firm of McKim, Mead and White in New York City as an assistant.

In 1892, Johnson came to Buffalo and continue his architectural practice. Significant projects from this period include the Alexander Main Curtiss House designed with partner James Marling. Johnson partnered with James Marling after Marling's previous partner, Herbert C Burdett died.

After Marling's death, Johnson, at the age of 32, formed a partnership with the German born and trained architect August Esenwein. From its inception in 1897, Esenwein & Johnson was one of the most successful architectural firms of the time and is credited with the design of many buildings that have become Western New York landmarks. These include the Niagara Mohawk Building, the United Office Building in Niagara Falls, New York, the Ellicott Square Building and various buildings for the Pan-American Exposition notably the Temple of Music (infamous as the site where President William McKinley was assassinated). Esenwein & Johnson designed many buildings for the United Hotels Company, which was the largest hotel chain in the country at the time.

Esenwein & Johnson's work was known for its diverse styles through a sixty-year history of designs, executing projects in Georgian Revival, Art Nouveau, Mayan Revival, and Art Deco styles. Of special note is the decorative features of Johnson's design for the 1912 Niagara Mohawk Building which foreshadowed Art Deco ornamentation. After the death of Esenwein in 1926, Johnson, in retirement, became advisory architect to the restoration of Old Fort Niagara.

== Personal life ==
Johnson later married Mary Edith Carter (who was born in Vermont in 1869) and together they were the parents of two daughters, both of whom were born in Buffalo:

- Katherine Carter Johnson (b. 1900), who married Barclay.
- Mary Edith Johnson (b. 1905), who married Judson Weldon Welch.

Johnson died in 1939 in Buffalo, New York, at Buffalo General Hospital at the age of 73; funeral services were held in his home at 731 West Delavan and he was buried in Oswego, New York.

== Significance ==
A number of Johnson's Buffalo, New York, buildings are listed on the National Register of Historic Places including The Calumet, Hotel Lafayette, M. Wile and Company Factory Building, Fosdick-Masten Park High School and Lafayette High School.

== Gallery ==
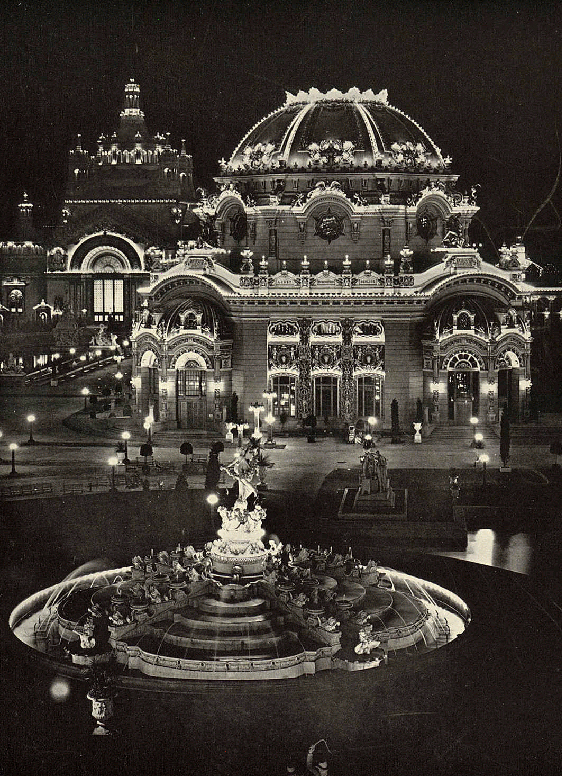
Nighttime photo of electrified Temple of Music.

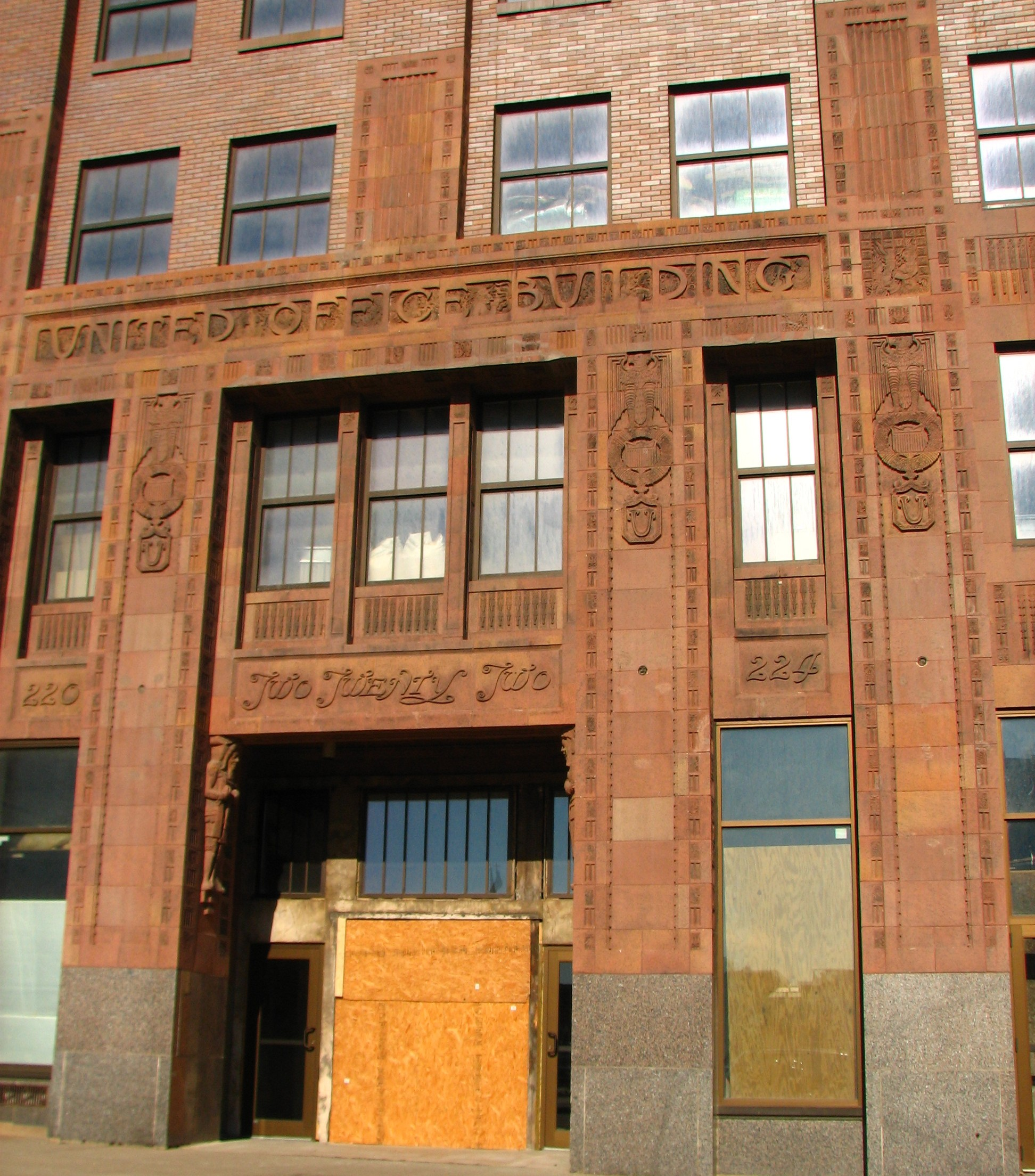
United Office Building, Niagara Falls, NY. Although abandoned in this photo, it has since been renovated and re-opened.

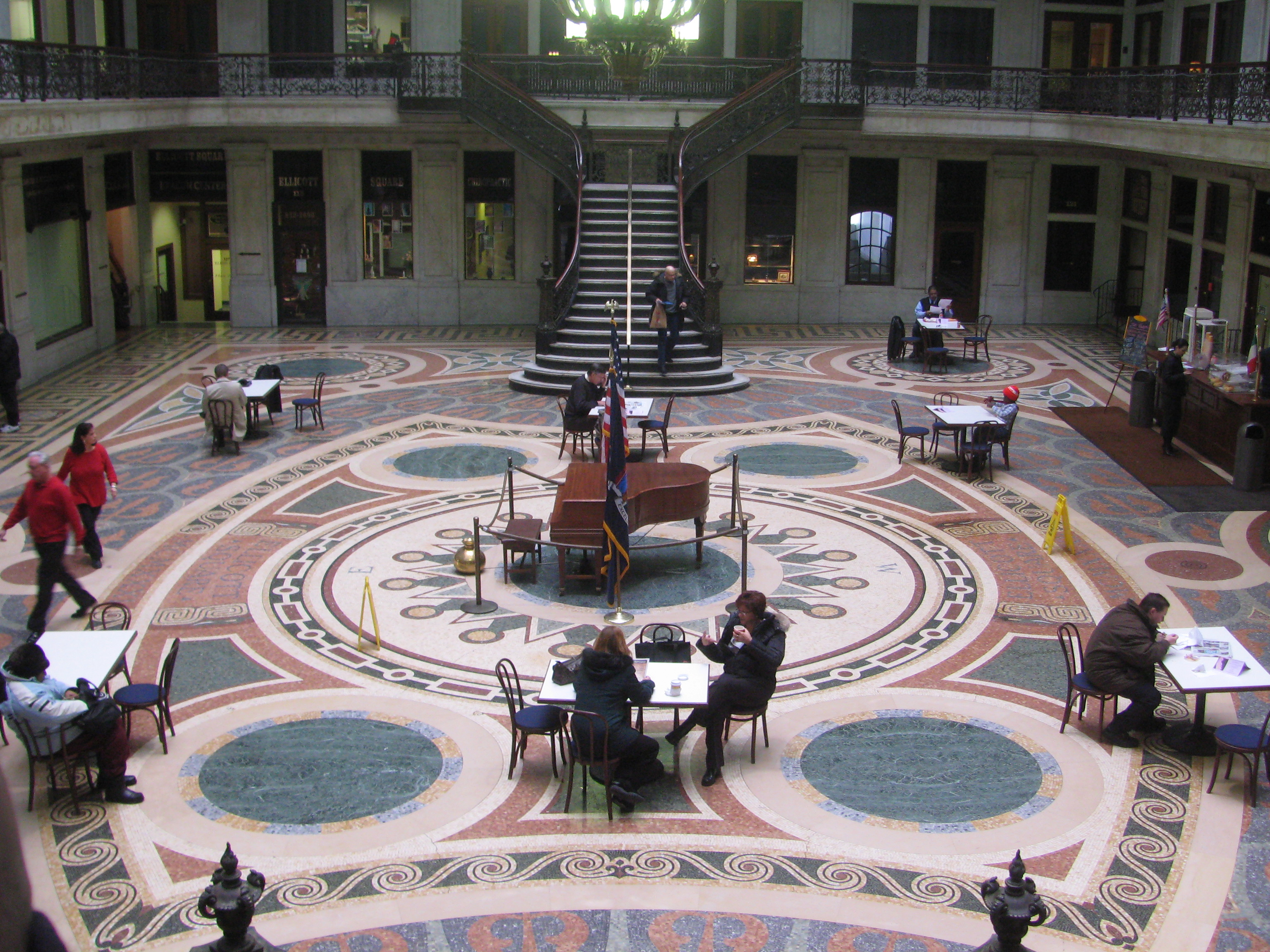
Inlaid floor of Ellicott Square Building, Buffalo, NY

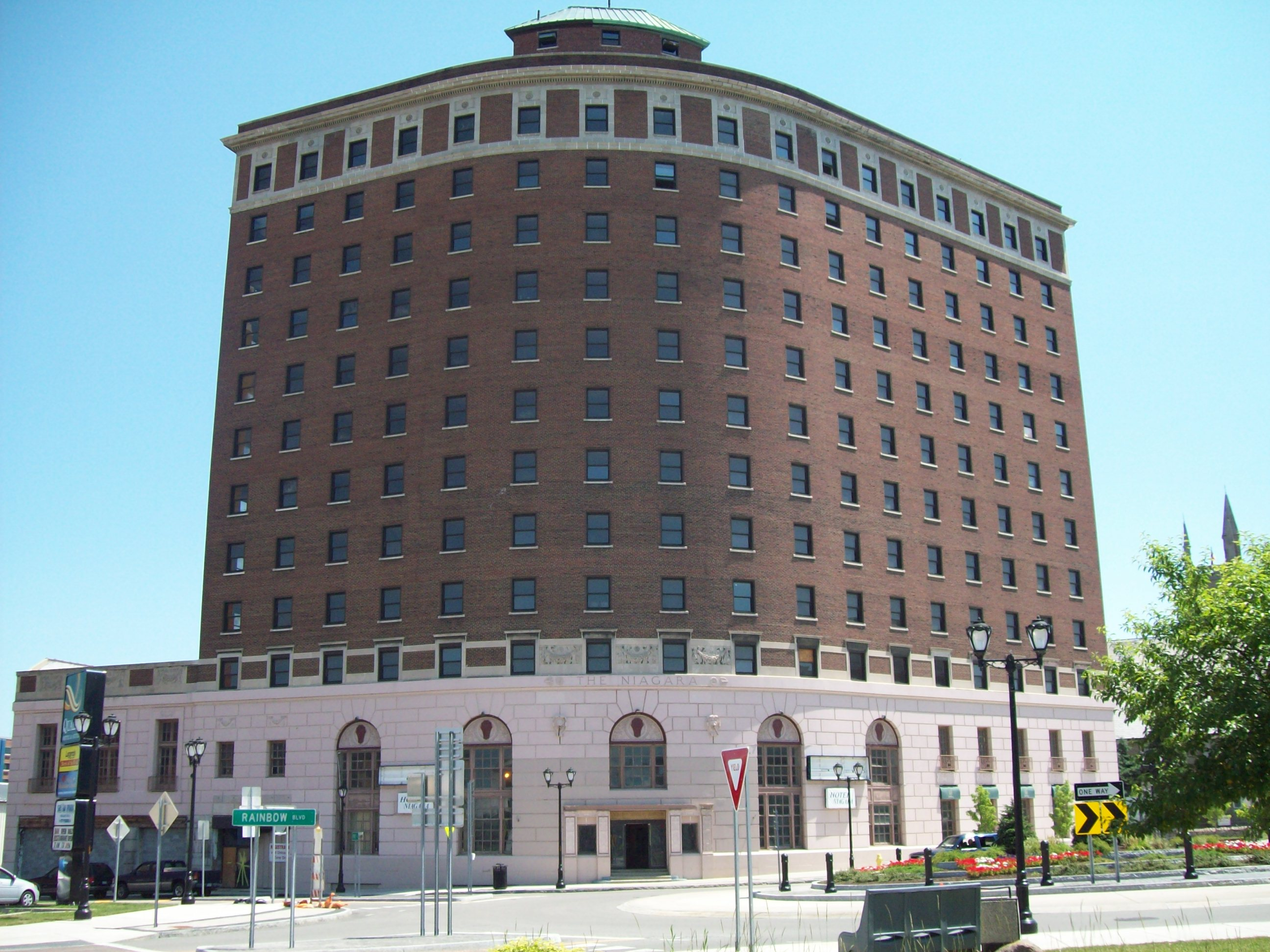
The Niagara, Niagara Falls, New York

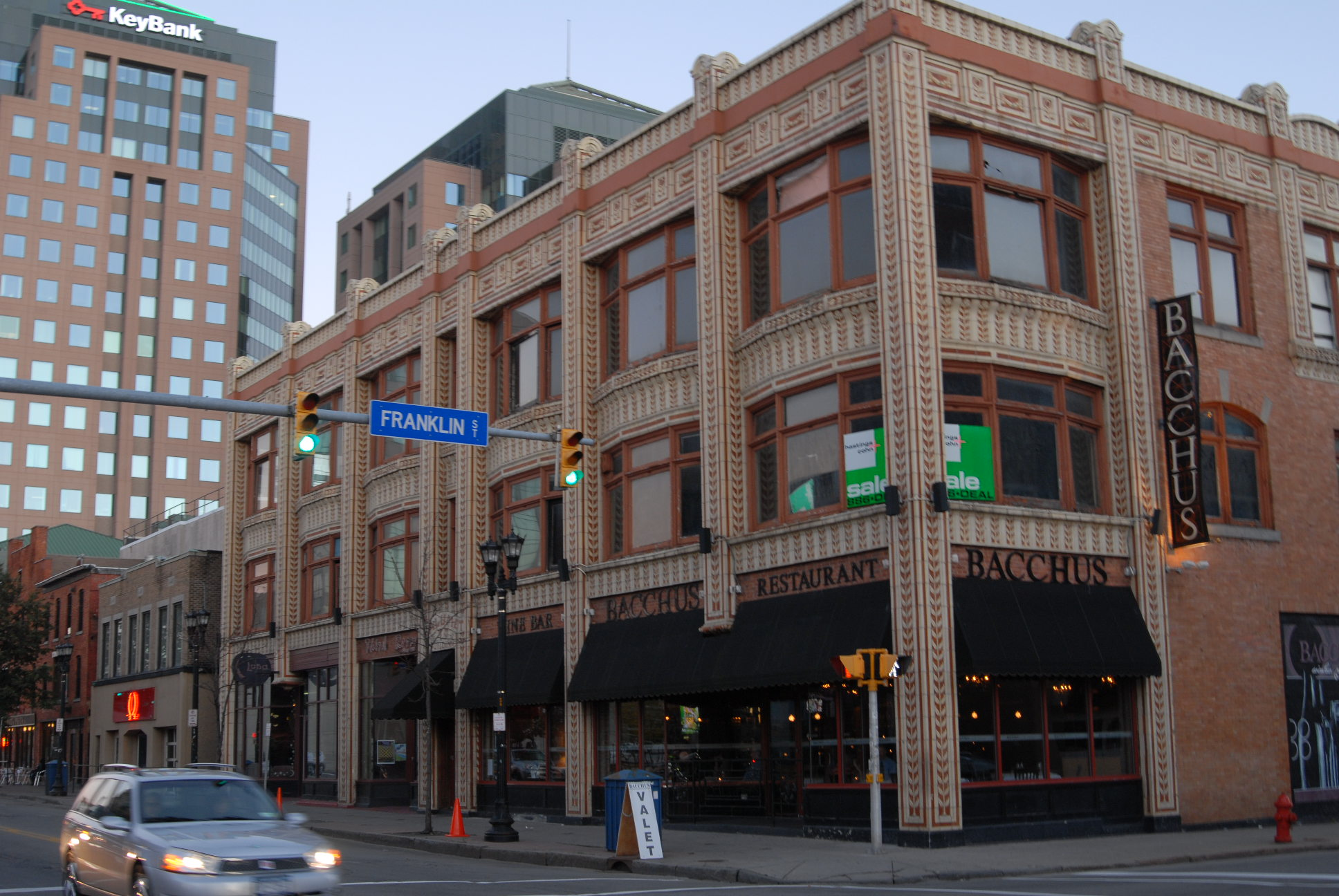
The Calumet, October 2010

== Selected works ==
=== Johnson & Marling ===
- 1894 - Harlow C. Curtiss Residence (with Marling) - Buffalo, NY
- 1985 - Alexander Main Curtiss House / (Ronald McDonald House) - 780 West Ferry Street - Buffalo, NY
- 1896 - Colonial Apartments - Buffalo, NY
- 1899 - Mayer & Weill Building - Demolished in 1977 - Buffalo, NY
- 1898 - Curtiss House / International Institute - 864 Delaware Avenue - Buffalo, NY

=== Esenwein & Johnson ===
- 1899 - Clarence L. Bryant House - 591 Delaware Avenue - Damaged by Arson - Buffalo, NY
- 1901 - Lafayette High School (Buffalo) - 370 Lafayette Avenue - Buffalo, NY
- 1901 - Pan-American Exposition Temple of Music - Demolished - Buffalo, NY
- 1901 - Pan-American Exposition Administration Building - Demolished - Buffalo, NY
- 1901 - Pan-American Exposition Alt Nurnberg - Demolished - Buffalo, NY
- 1901 - Pan-American Exposition Brick Art Gallery - Demolished - Buffalo, NY
- 1901 - Public School No. 43 Building - 161 Benzinger Street - Buffalo, NY
- 1903 - Myron G. Farmer Residence - 46 Summit Avenue - Buffalo, NY
- 1905 - Ethel Mann Curtiss House - 100 Lincoln Parkway, Buffalo, NY
- 1905 - Ansonia Building - 712-726 Main Street - Buffalo, NY
- 1905 - Charles Mosier Residence - 96 Bidwell Parkway - Buffalo, NY
- 1906 - Calumet Building - 46-58 West Chippewa Street - Buffalo NY
- 1907 - Asa Silverthorne House - 877 Delaware Avenue - Buffalo, NY
- 1907 - Louis Kurtzman Residence - 24 Lincoln Parkway - Buffalo, NY
- 1908 - Barker Square Condominiums - 172 Linwood Avenue - Buffalo, NY
- 1908 - Emily H. Swift House - 21 Colonial Circle - Buffalo, NY
- 1908 - Buffalo Hotel (The first Statler Hotel) - Washington & Swan Streets - Buffalo, NY
- 1910 - William H. and Essie Barr Statler House - 177 Bidwell Parkway, Buffalo, NY
- 1911 - J. N. Adam & Company Building - 371 Washington Street - Buffalo, NY
- 1911 - Automobile Club of Buffalo - 10405 Main Street - Clarence, NY
- 1911 - John Sinclair House - 94 Jewett Parkway - Buffalo, NY
- 1912 - AM&A's Department Store (Corner of Washington and Eagle Street - Buffalo, NY
- 1912 - Niagara Mohawk Building / The Electric Tower - Buffalo, NY
- 1912 - Root Building - 70-86 West Chippewa Street - Buffalo, NY
- 1912 - Schoellkopf-Vom Berge Manor - 121 Chapin Parkway - Buffalo, NY
- 1913 - Ellsworth Milton Statler Residence - 154 Soldier's Circle - Demolished in 1938 - Buffalo, NY
- 1914 - Fosdick-Masten Park High School - Buffalo, NY
- 1919 - Dickinson Jewelry Store - 620 Main Street - Buffalo, NY
- 1922 - Prince Edward Hotel - Ouellette and Park Streets - Demolished in 1976 - Windsor, Ontario
- 1923 - The Niagara (Fallsview Travelodge Hotel) - Niagara Falls, NY
- 1924 - Curtiss Building / Pleu Building - 357-363 Delaware Avenue - Buffalo, NY
- 1924 - M. Wile Factory - 77 Goodell Street - Buffalo, NY
- 1926 - Frank A. Dudley Residence - 551 Mountain View Drive - Lewiston, NY
- 1926 - Niagara Share Building - 70 Niagara Street - Buffalo, NY
- 1927 - Thomas J. McKinney House - 35 Lincoln Parkway - Buffalo, NY

=== After Esenwein's death ===
- 1929 - Buffalo Museum of Science - 1020 Humboldt Parkway - Buffalo, NY
- 1929 - Inlaid marble floors of Ellicott Square Building - Buffalo, NY
- 1929 - United Office Building - Niagara Falls, NY
