= The Niagara =

Hotel in New York

- The Hotel Niagara
- U.S. National Register of Historic Places
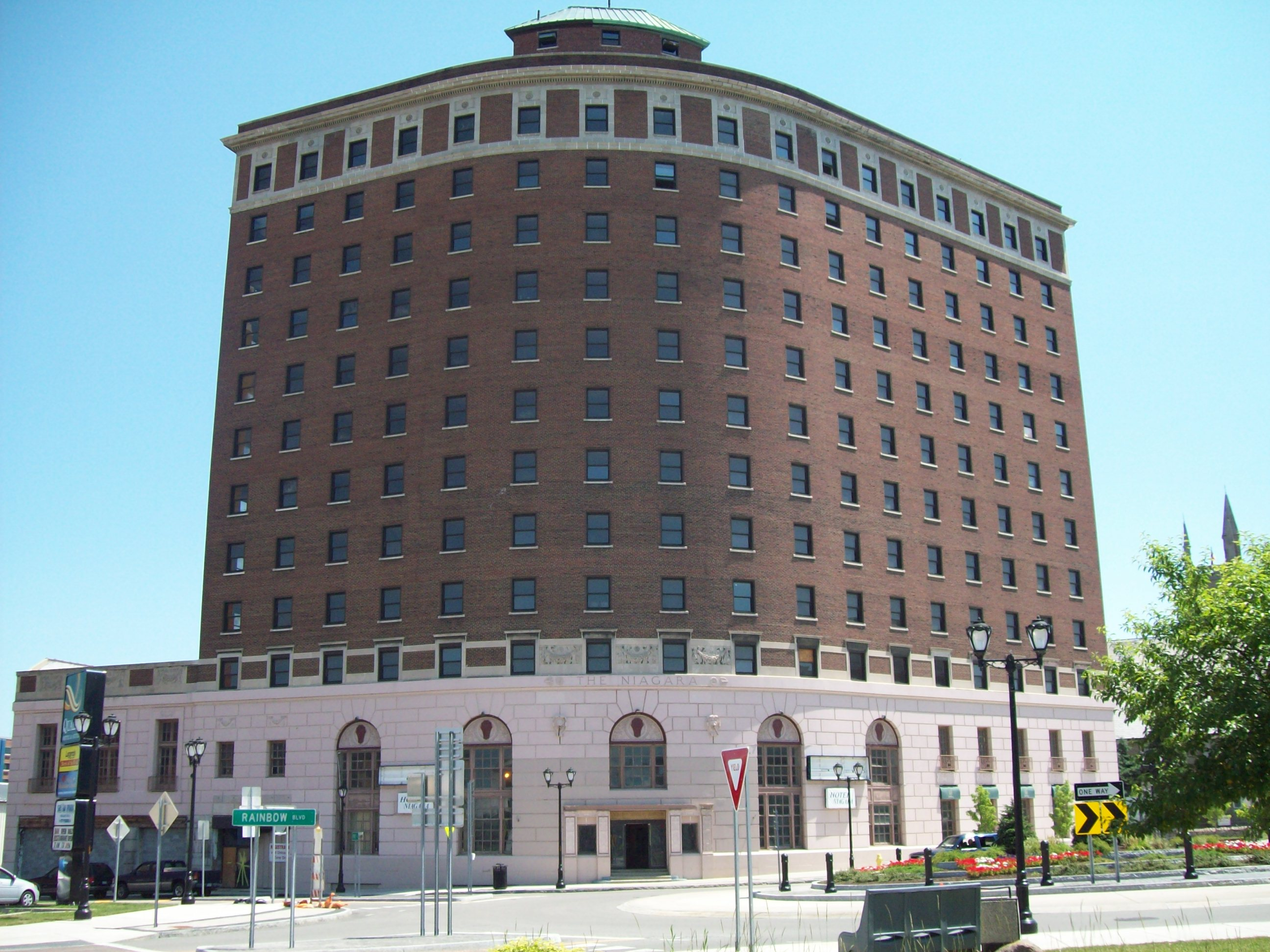
- The Hotel Niagara, June 2009

- Location within New York Location within the United States
- Location: 201 Rainbow Blvd., Niagara Falls, New York
- Coordinates: 43°5′5.79″N 79°3′40.43″W
- Built: 1925
- Architect: Esenwein and Johnson; Wright and Kremers
- Architectural style: Late 19th and 20th Century Revivals
- NRHP reference No.: 08001145
- Added to NRHP: December 5, 2008

The Hotel Niagara is a vacant landmark hotel in Niagara Falls, Niagara County, New York. It was listed on the National Register of Historic Places in 2008.

== History ==
=== Early years ===
The hotel was built by Niagara Falls businessman Frank A. Dudley and operated by the United Hotels Company. The 12 story, steel frame and concrete hotel was designed by prominent Buffalo architects Esenwein and Johnson and was built in 1924 (cornerstone laid on March 24, 1924). The hotel was dedicated on April 8, 1925 and opened for business the following day. It is located 1/4 mile from the Horseshoe Falls, it is one block from the Seneca Niagara Casino. It has nearly 200 guest rooms as well as convention facilities. It has been known by various names including The Hotel Niagara; John's Niagara Hotel; Park's Inn; International; Days Inn-Falls View; and Travelodge Niagara Falls.

The hotel's primary public rooms include the lobby, ballroom and main dining room and as of March 2016, have survived largely intact. They feature elaborate ceiling plaster moldings and columns, gilded capitals, faux limestone walls, oak and emerald terrazzo floors.

=== 2007 closure and subsequent restoration plans ===
The property closed for renovations in 2007, which never took place. In 2010, the property was foreclosed by the State Bank of Texas, which expressed no interest in ownership, after the owners, Amidee Hotels & Resorts, abandoned the property and allowed it to fall into foreclosure after their parent company, Amidee Capital Group, LLC, filed for Chapter 11 Bankruptcy. The building was condemned by the Niagara Falls Department of Code Enforcement after the heating system failed, which caused water pipes in the building to burst. The city shut off the water when that happened, leaving the building without running water or a functional fire sprinkler system, which constitutes several code violations.

In April 2011, the property was sold at a foreclosure auction for $1,250,000 to Jamil Kara, a developer from Vancouver, British Columbia, Canada. He told the Niagara Gazette, a Niagara Falls newspaper, that he planned to convert the building into a five-star hotel and condominium.

In September 2011, Toronto developer Harry Stinson bought the building from Kara for an undisclosed amount, intending to restore it. His company, Stinson Developments, estimated they would finish renovations by summer 2013. However the work was never completed.

Stinson sold the building in 2015 to Reception Hotels & Resorts, for $4.4 million. Reception similarly announced plans to renovate the structure. they later announced that it would become a Radisson Hotel on the completion of a $21.5 million makeover.

In March 2016, the New York State-run USA Niagara Development Corporation agreed to purchase the property from its current owner, Harry Stinson of JSK International Corp. USA Niagara Development Corp. plans on issuing a new request for proposals to complete renovations of the building.

The purchase price was described as "up to $4.4 million," with funding for the acquisition, inspections, insurance and property holding services, up to $5 million, will be provided through Gov. Andrew Cuomo's state-financed "Buffalo Billion" development initiative.

It was announced in December 2019 that the hotel would be restored by Syracuse developer Ed Riley, who previously restored the historic Hotel Syracuse as the Marriott Syracuse Downtown. The restoration was to cost $42 million, and was set to receive $10.6 million in state and federal historic preservation tax credits. The hotel was to reopen in 2021 as part of the Tribute Portfolio division of Marriott Hotels & Resorts. It was to have 160 rooms, three restaurants, banquet facilities, and a rooftop lounge. The restoration was stalled by the economic impact of the COVID-19 pandemic, and the NCIDA withdrew its tax incentive package in 2021, when the owners found themselves unable to secure loans for the restoration.

In June 2024, Riley's Brine Wells Development LLC resubmitted its plans to restore the structure, at a cost of $50 million.

Work on the $58.8M restoration was restarted in December 2025, with a 2027 reopening targeted. It is set to be part of The Unbound Collection division of Hyatt.

== In popular culture ==
It was reportedly the home of Marilyn Monroe and Joe DiMaggio while filming Niagara in 1952.

Former guests of the hotel include U.S. President John F. Kennedy, Frank Sinatra, Sammy Davis Jr., Joseph Cotten, and Al Capone.

== Gallery ==
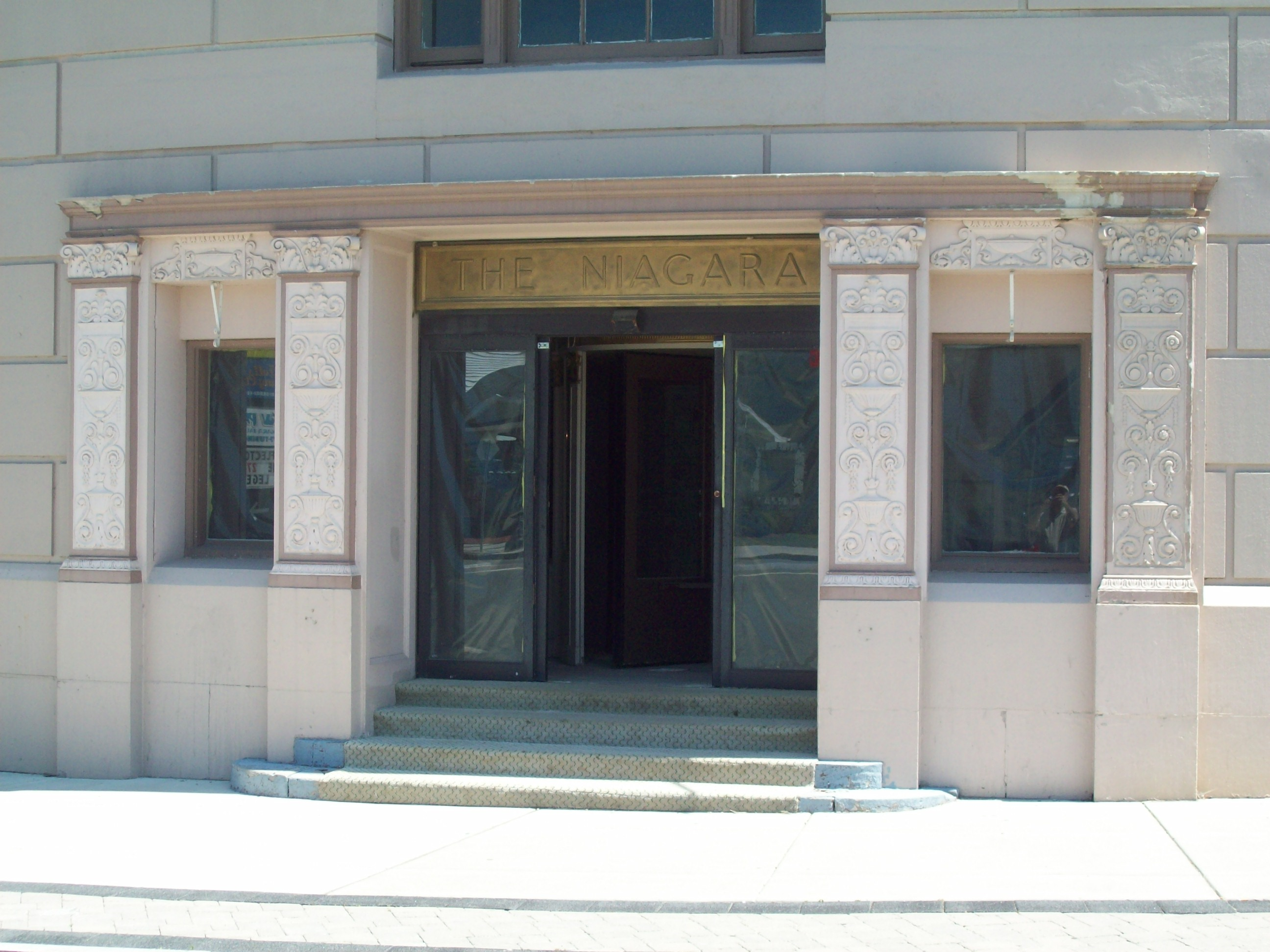
The Niagara, Entry Details, June 2009

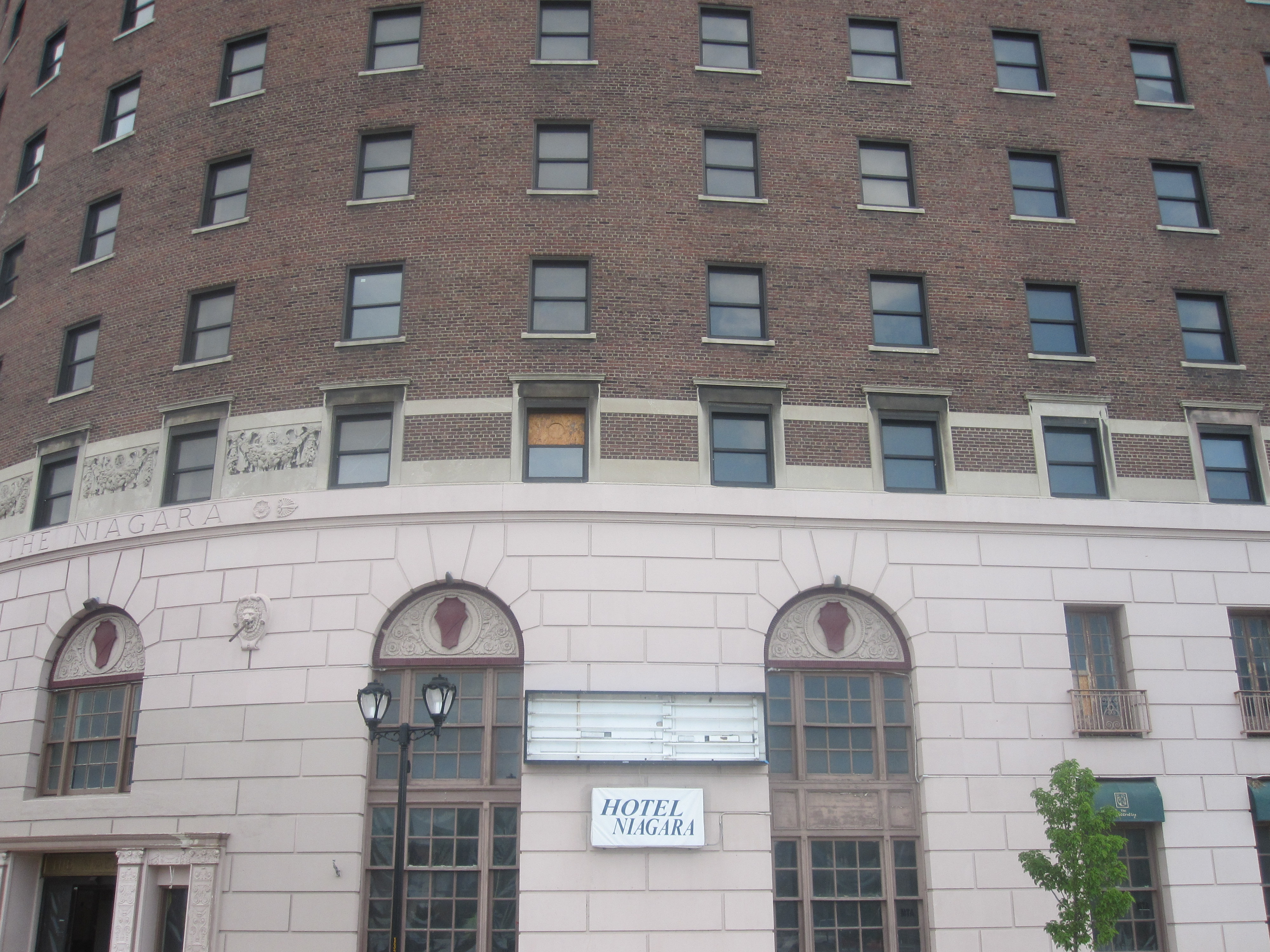
Entrance to the hotel

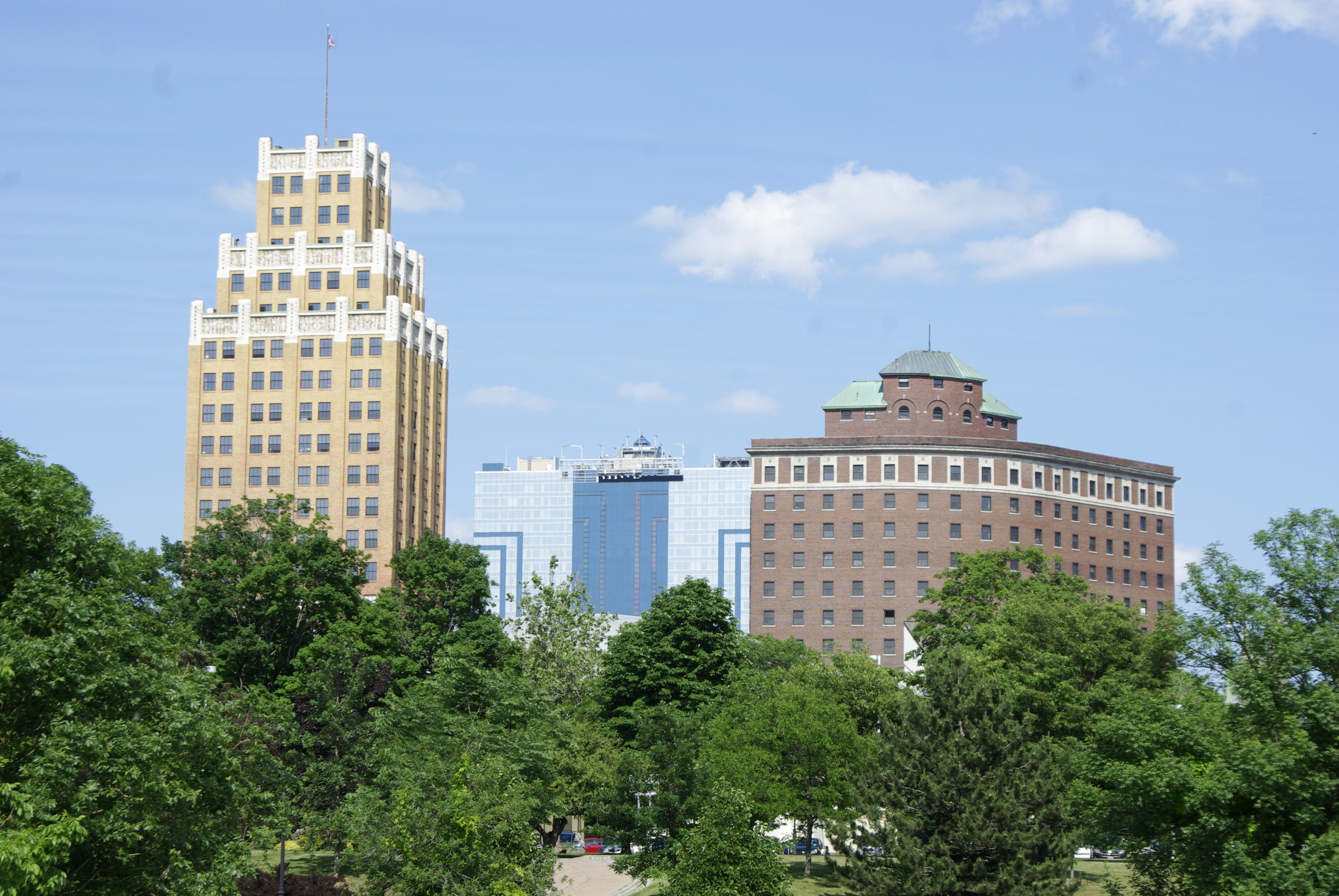
Hotel Niagara adjacent to the United Office Building
