= Electric Tower =

Historic commercial building in New York, United States

- General Electric Tower
- U.S. National Register of Historic Places
- New York State Register of Historic Places
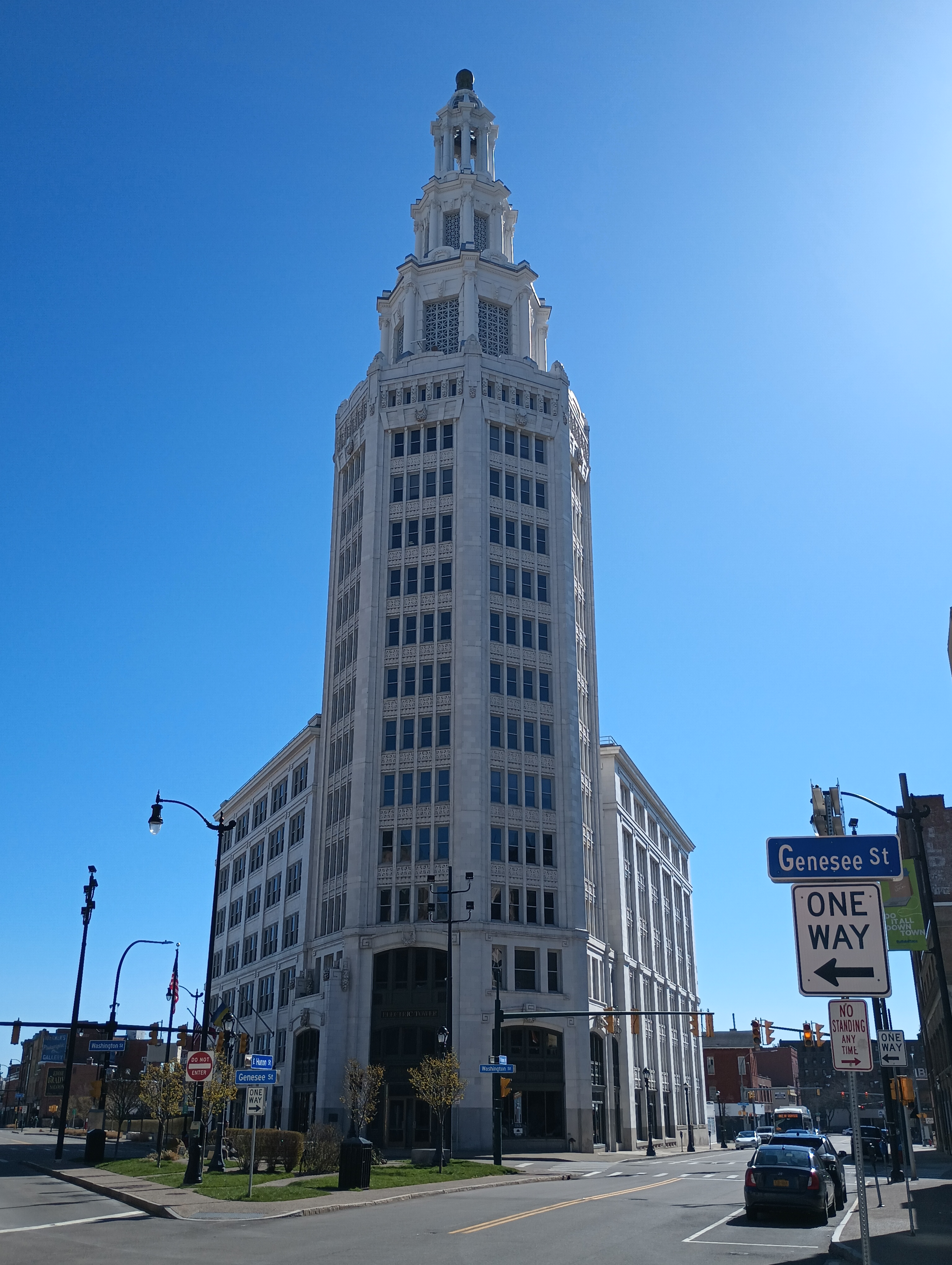
- General Electric Tower, April 2024

- Location within New York Location within the United States
- Location: 535 Washington Street, Buffalo, New York 14203
- Coordinates: 42°53′18.9594″N 78°52′18.8394″W
- Area: less than one acre
- Built: 1912
- Architects: Esenwein & Johnson; E.B. Green and Sons
- Architectural style: Beaux Arts
- NRHP reference No.: 08000865
- NYSRHP No.: 02940.003080

Significant dates
- Added to NRHP: September 12, 2008
- Designated NYSRHP: July 25, 2008

Electric Tower (or General Electric Tower) is an historic office building and skyscraper located at the corner of Washington and Genesee Streets in Buffalo. It is the seventh tallest building in Buffalo. It stands 294 feet (89.6 m) and 14 stories tall and is in the Beaux-Arts Classical Revival style. It was designed by James A. Johnson and built in 1912. The tower was based upon an earlier Electric Tower constructed for the 1901 Pan-American Exposition; as with most of the buildings constructed for that event, the original was only temporary and demolished shortly after the fair ended. Additions were made in 1923 and 1928. The white terra-cotta clad was originally built as the Niagara Mohawk Building and features an octagonal tower which steps back three times to terminate in a large lantern. It is also known as Iskalo Electric Tower, for the real estate development company that owns the building.

The decorative symbols featuring aspects of electricity production are considered precursors to subsequent art deco design.

Like One M&T Plaza, the spire of the tower is illuminated with different holiday colors at night throughout the year. Both buildings are illuminated blue and gold for the Buffalo Sabres during the National Hockey League playoffs.

The Electric Tower hosts the annual Buffalo Ball Drop on New Year's Eve, one of the continent's largest ball drops outside the New York City ball drop. Crowds gather in Roosevelt Plaza to celebrate the New Year. The Buffalo Ball Drop is accompanied by live performances and a firework show.

It was listed on the National Register of Historic Places in September 2008.

== Gallery ==
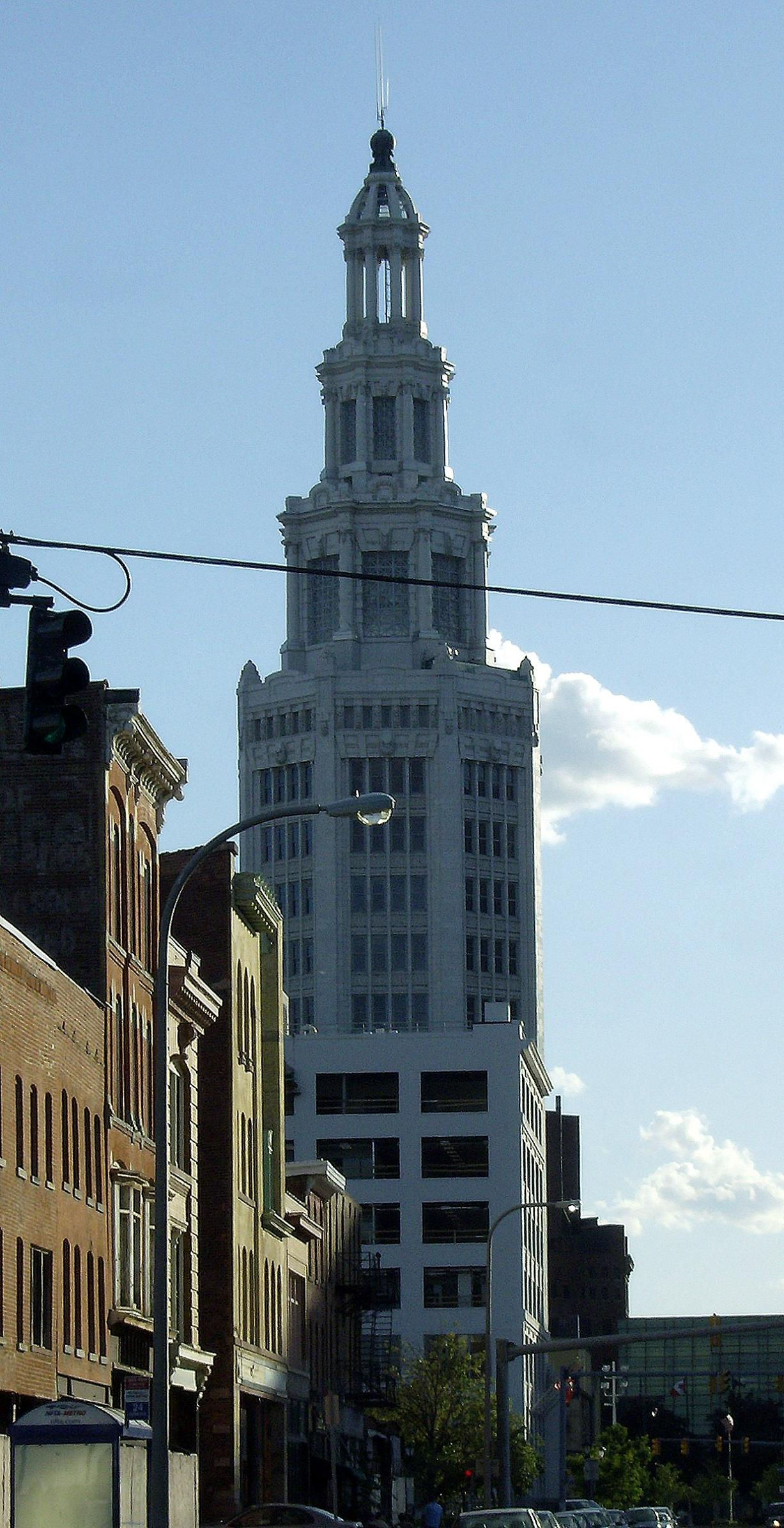
Electric Tower from Genesee Street, August 2007

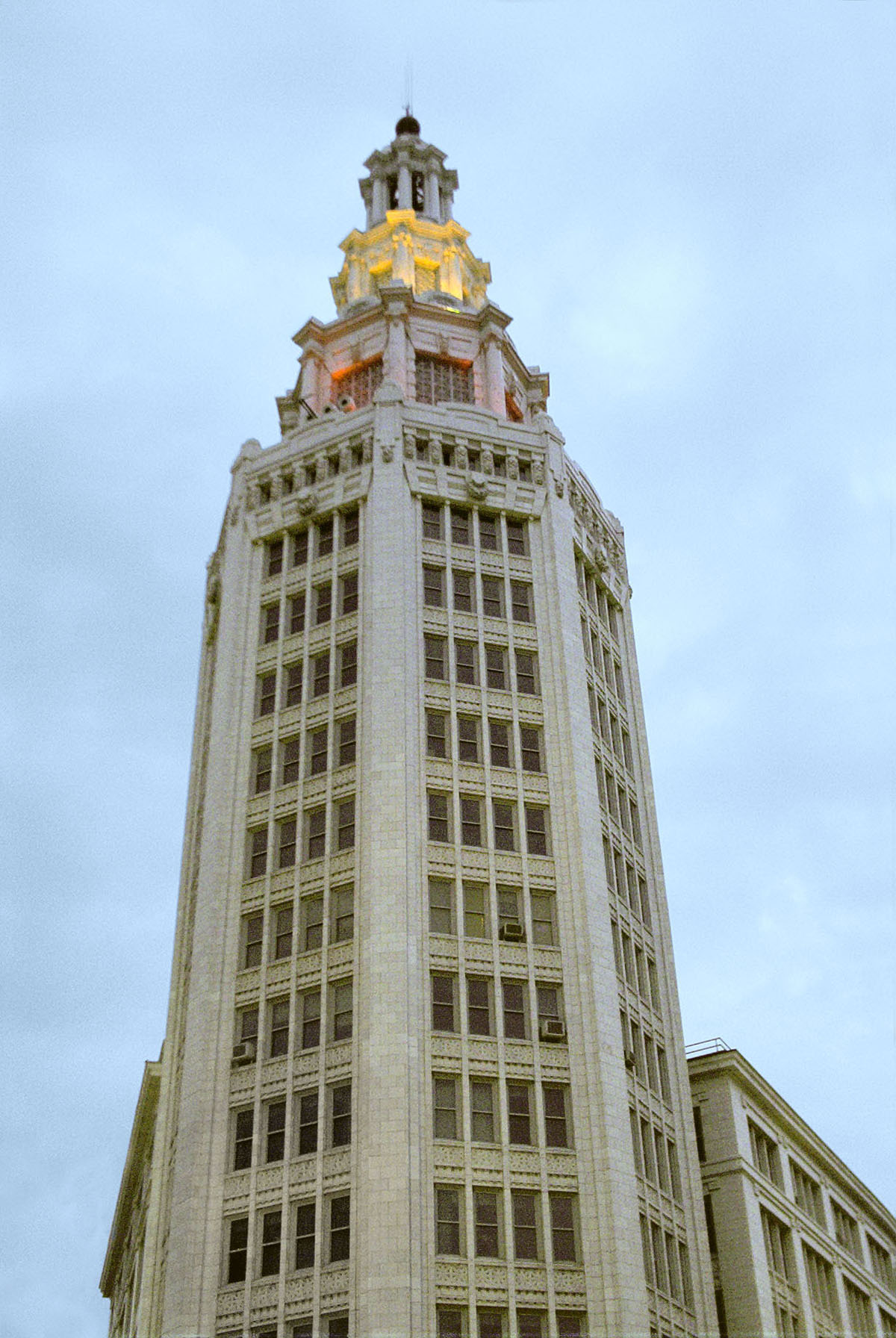
Electric Tower closeup, 2004

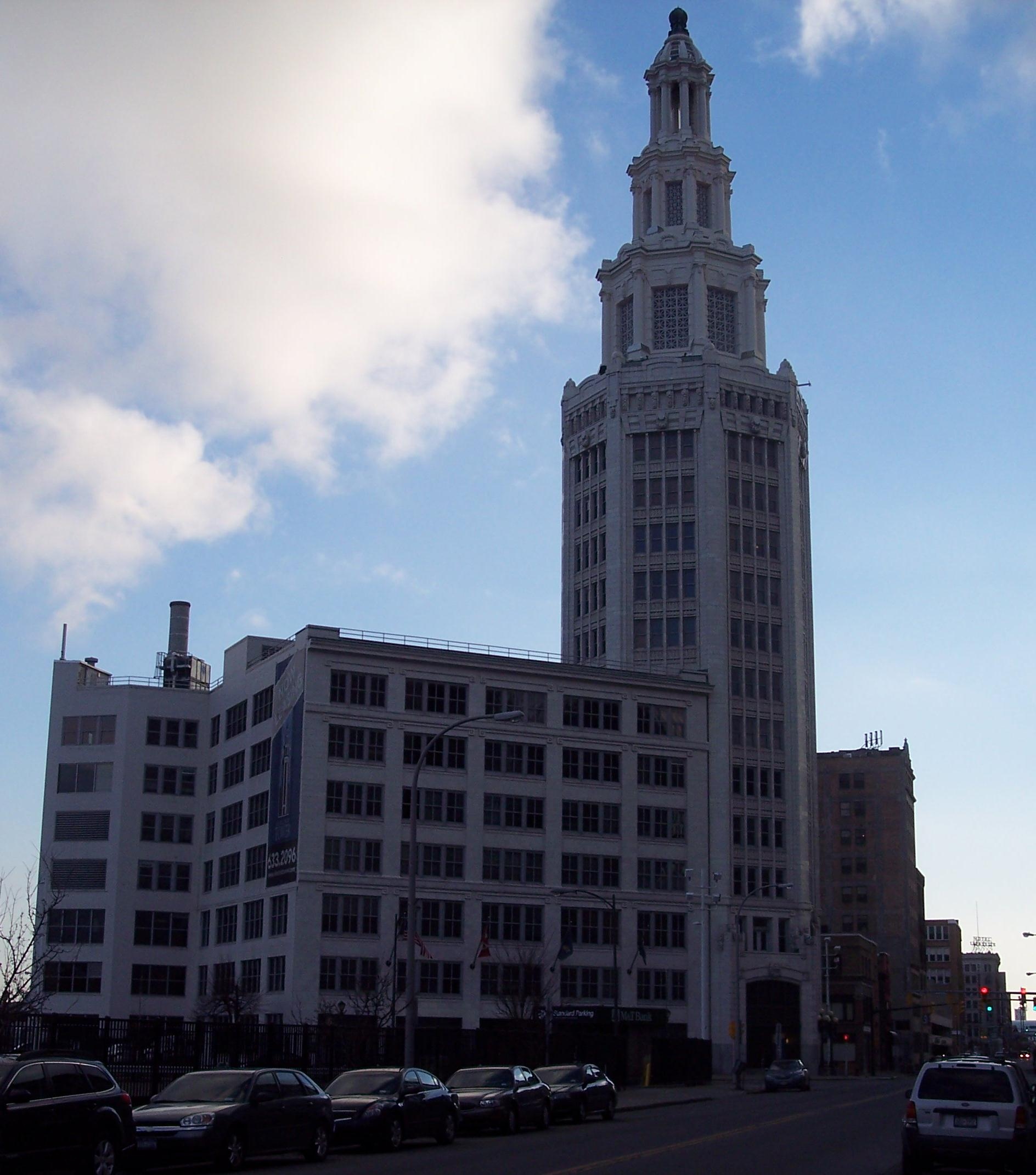
Electric Tower, Genesee Street Side, February 2012 (after 2011 renovations)

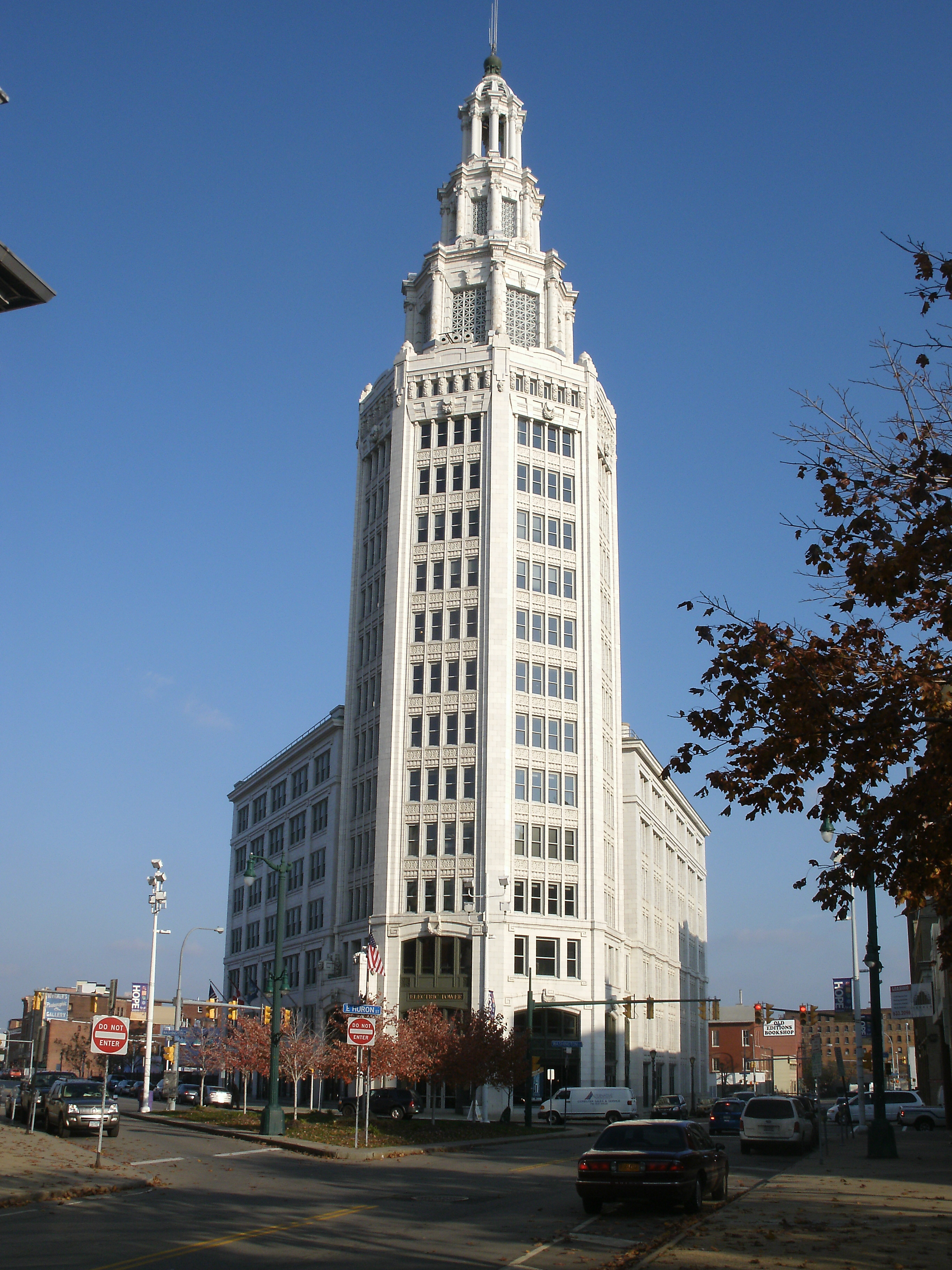
November 2010 (before 2011 renovations)

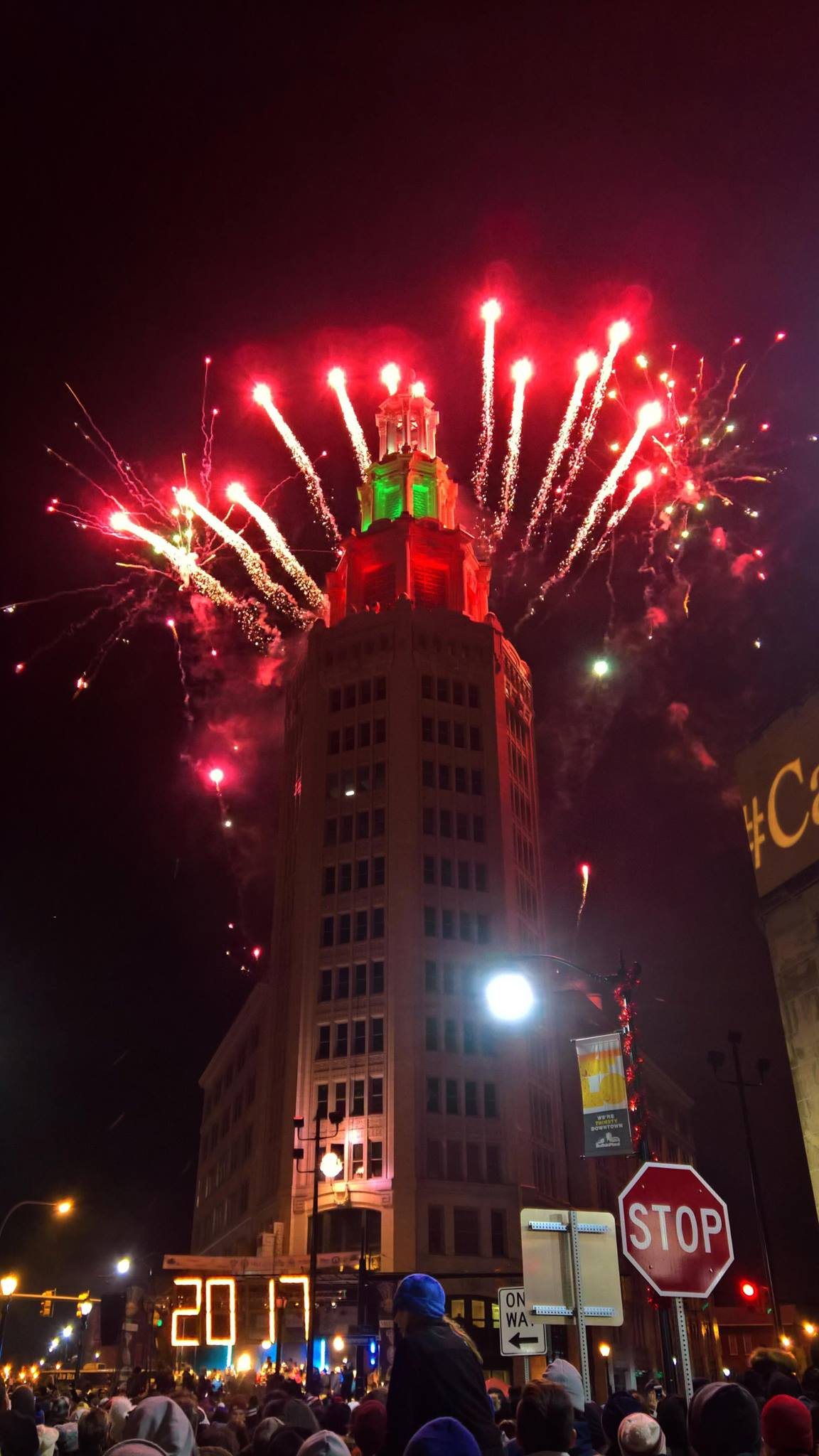
The Buffalo Ball Drop New Year Fireworks Display (2016-2017)

== See also ==
- List of tallest buildings in Buffalo, New York
- Niagara Hudson Building, in Syracuse, also known as "Niagara Mohawk Building"

== Sources ==
- Valance, Hélène (2015). "Buffalo: The "Electric City of the Future" that Never Really Was". In Isenstadt, Sandy; Neumann, Dietrich; Petty, Margaret Maile (eds.). Cities of Light: Two Centuries of Urban Illumination. New York: Routledge. doi:10.4324/9781315747835-6. ISBN 978-1-315-74783-5.

Preceded by Erie County Hall	Tallest building in Buffalo, New York; 1912–1925; 90 m	Succeeded by Liberty Building
