= The Calumet =

Historic commercial building in New York, United States

- U.S. National Register of Historic Places
- New York State Register of Historic Places
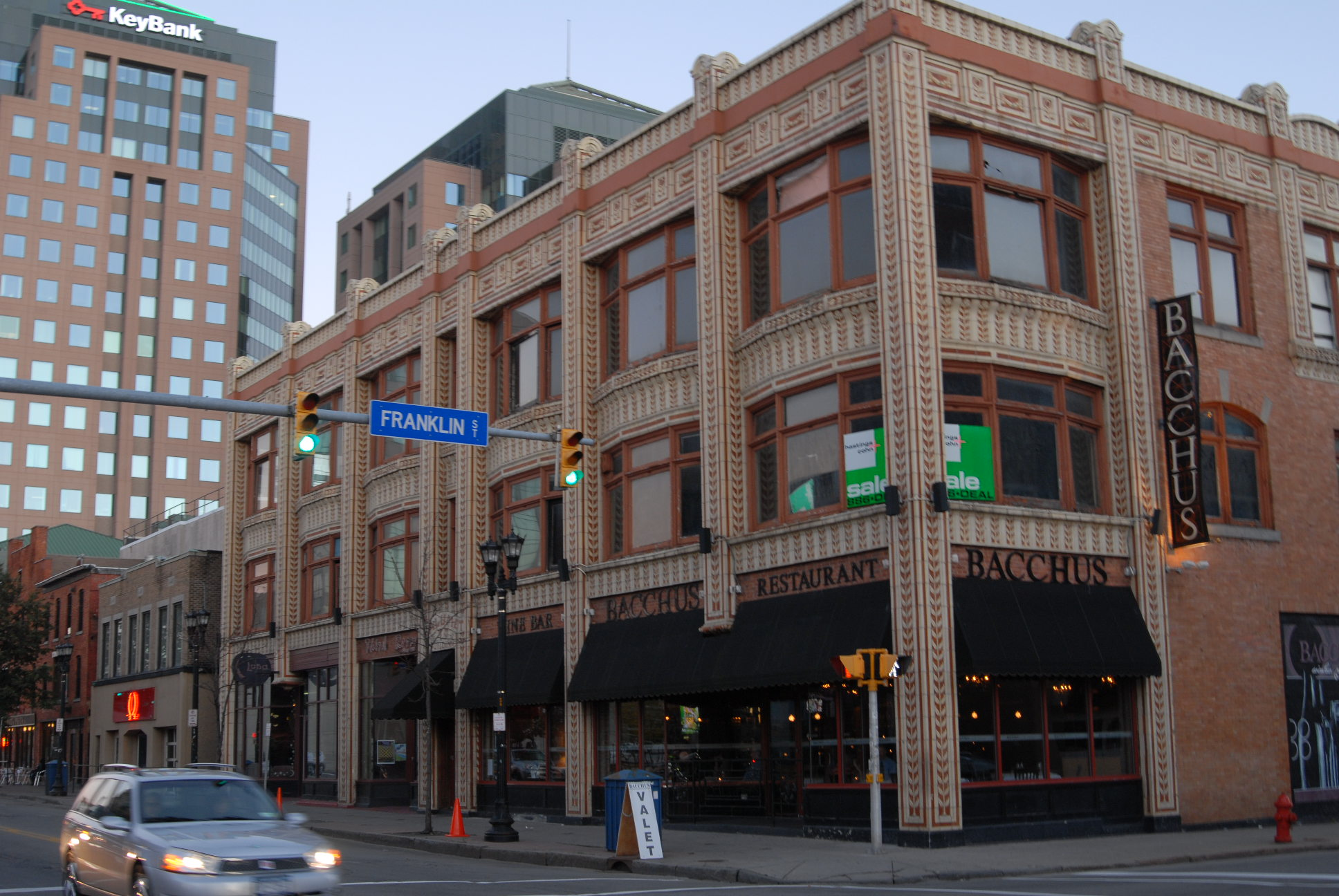
- Calumet Building, October 2010

- Location within New York Location within the United States
- Location: 46-58 W. Chippewa St. / 233 Franklin St., Buffalo, New York
- Coordinates: 42°53′25″N 78°52′29″W
- Area: 0.29 acres (0.12 ha)
- Built: 1906
- Architect: Esenwein and Johnson
- NRHP reference No.: 10000958
- NYSRHP No.: 02940.002893

Significant dates
- Added to NRHP: November 29, 2010
- Designated NYSRHP: October 13, 2010

The Calumet is a historic commercial building located at Buffalo in Erie County, New York. It was designed in 1906, and is a three-story steel framed building covered in decorative architectural terra cotta. The distinctive glazed white and burnt sienna terra cotta is detailed with a centrally located reed or running stem and four leaves depicting the Calamus palm.

It was listed on the National Register of Historic Places in 2010.
