= Temple of Music =

Concert hall in Buffalo, New York, U.S.

Coordinates: 42°56′19″N 78°52′25″W

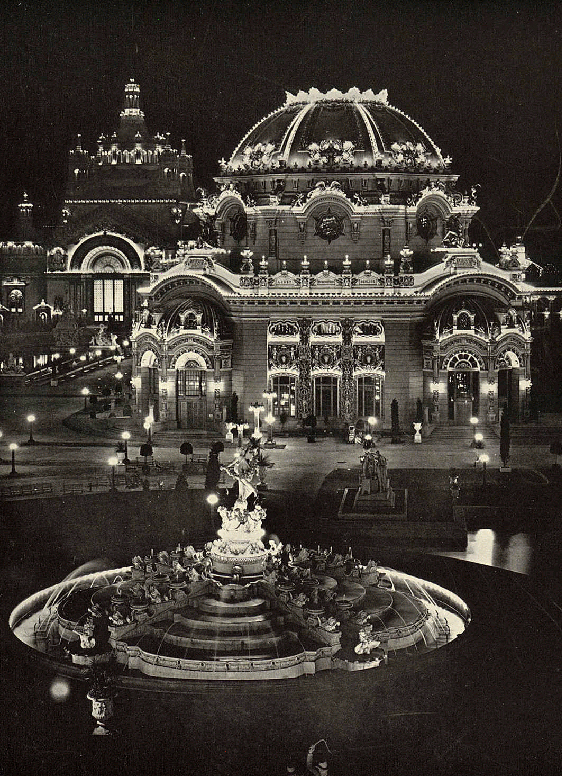
Temple of Music at night, photograph, 1901.

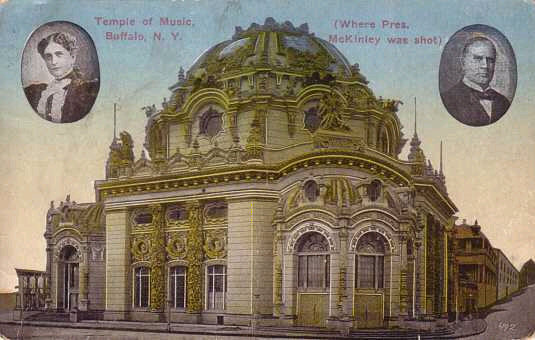
"Temple of Music, Buffalo, N.Y. (Where Pres. McKinley was shot)," historical postcard.

The Temple of Music was a concert hall and auditorium built for the Pan-American Exposition which was held in Buffalo, New York, in 1901. United States President William McKinley was shot inside the building on September 6, 1901, by Leon Czolgosz. The structure, like most of the other buildings at the exposition, was demolished when the fair ended.

== The building ==
The Temple of Music was designed by architects August Esenwein and James A. Johnson for the Pan-American Exhibition, to serve as a concert hall and ceremonial stage. It was built at a cost of $85,000 (over $2,800,000 in 2022 dollars). It was an eclectic combination of various architectural elements. Its major influence was the Italian Renaissance style, and it complied with the Exposition's Board of Architects' overall plan for the exhibition, called the Free Renaissance style. Like most of the major structures at this World Fair, the Temple of Music was extensively electrified, both internally and externally.

== Style ==
The Temple's dome rose 180 feet (54.86 m) above the ground floor and the hall itself had seating for over 2,000 people. According to Chuck LaChiusa, a Buffalo native and retired City Honors English teacher, "The building was colored in light yellows, with gold and red trimmings, and the panels in the dome were in light blue, producing an extremely beautiful effect." Four ornate sculptures, representing sacred music, lyric music, music of the dance, and heroic music, executed by Isodore Konti, graced the four entrance portals into the building. The Temple's appeal lay in its spacious interior and new use of lighting. Although the exterior was a great sight, the interior was also impressive. The Temple of Music had seating for over 2,000 people and possessed a pipe organ of 52 ranks built by Emmons Howard & Son. The organ was built for St. Louis Roman Catholic Church in Buffalo, but at the end of the exposition, it was found to be physically too big to be installed there. Buffalo businessman J. N Adams bought it and had it installed in the city music hall, which stood on the corner of Virginia St. & Elmwood Avenue. Demolished when replaced by Kleinhan's Music Hall, the organ was put in storage, deteriorated, and was finally sold for scrap. The myth that the organ in St. Louis Church is the Expo organ still persists, but it is a myth.

A popular local legend holds that a stained glass dome in the now-vacant J.N. Adam Memorial Hospital in Perrysburg, New York, was salvaged from the Temple of Music. However, a visual comparison between the hospital's dome and this rendering of the Temple of Music shows no resemblance between the two.

== Creator ==
August Esenwein was born in Esenwein-Virnsberg, Württemberg, in 1856. The family moved to the United States in 1861 and returned to Germany in 1871, where August went to private elementary schools. He attended the University of Stuttgart for five years, studying architecture and engineering. After graduation, Esenwein went to Paris, where he worked as a drafter.

After two years in Paris, Esenwein emigrated to the United States and settled in Buffalo, where he worked as an architect. The Temple of Music was Esenwein's submission to an architectural competition for the Pan-American Exposition and it won first place. He went on to design three more buildings for the Exposition: the Administration Building, Alt Nurnberg, and the brick-art gallery. Esenwein also served on the Pan-American Board of Architects.

== Shooting of William McKinley ==
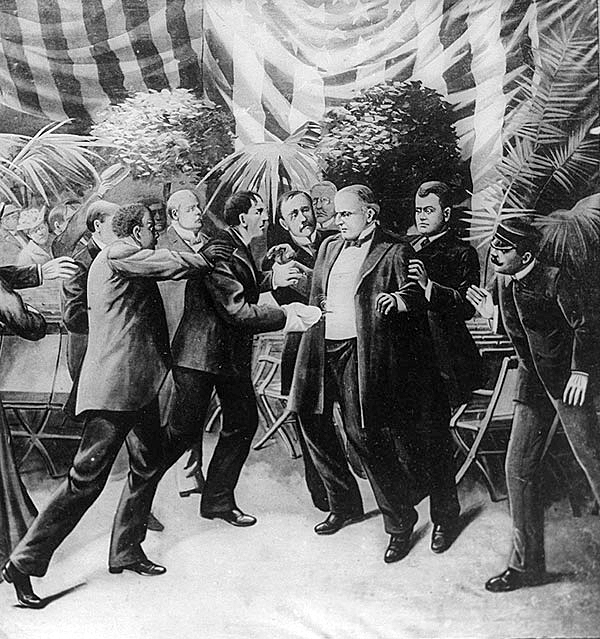
Drawing by T. Dart Walker depicting the shooting.

On September 5, 1901, United States President William McKinley delivered a speech on tariffs and foreign trade at the exposition. The following day, designated as "President's Day" at the exposition, McKinley was shot by Leon Czolgosz while greeting the public at the Temple of Music. McKinley died one week later in Buffalo.

== Location ==
After the Exposition closed, the Temple of Music and the other plaster buildings were torn down, and the area between Delaware Avenue and Elmwood Avenue was turned into a residential subdivision bisected by the Lincoln Parkway. On June 28, 1921, the Buffalo and Erie County Historical Society dedicated a simple granite boulder and marker on a traffic island dividing Fordham Drive, near that parkway, to mark the area where the Temple of Music was located. "But the spot where the assassination actually took place has been the subject of speculation for much of the century," a reporter would write more than 87 years after the event, adding, "Some say it's a toss-up between 30 and 34 Fordham Drive, while others say it occurred across the street at 29 Fordham or at the end of the island."
