= J. N. Adam–AM&A Historic District =

Historic district in New York, United States

- U.S. National Register of Historic Places
- U.S. Historic district
- New York State Register of Historic Places
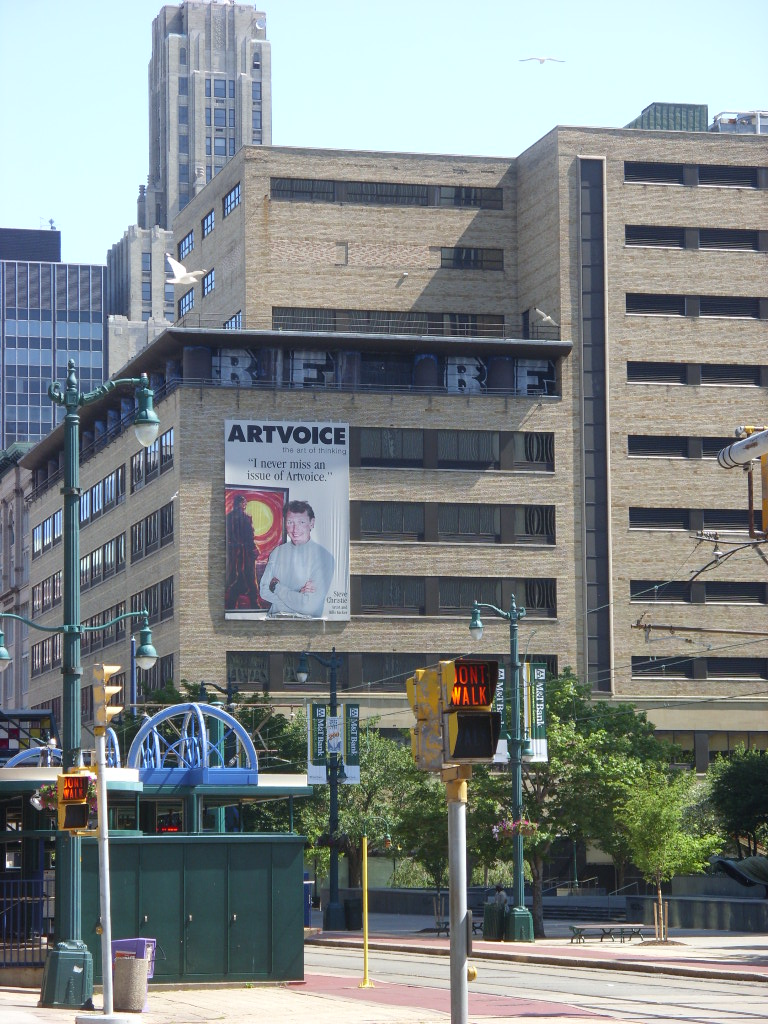
- J. N. Adam–AM&A Historic District, Buffalo, New York, June 2009

- Location within New York Location within the United States
- Location: Main St., E. Eagle St., Washington St., Ellicott St., Buffalo, New York
- Coordinates: 42°53′2.75″N 78°52′25.65″W
- Area: 2.4 acres (0.97 ha)
- Built: 1886
- Architectural style: Early Commercial, Classical Revival
- NRHP reference No.: 09000056

Significant dates
- Added to NRHP: February 20, 2009
- Designated NYSRHP: December 19, 2008

J. N. Adam–AM&A Historic District is a national historic district located at Buffalo in Erie County, New York. The district resulted from the agglomeration of commercial structures over many years of commercial growth and still reflects conscious decisions made by the original planners of the J. N. Adam & Co., and later AM&A's department stores. The main department store was designed by Starrett & van Vleck and built in 1935, with additions made in 1946–1948. The service building and entrances date to 1909 and is a six-story, brick flat roofed commercial structure. Two six story, brick commercial structures fronting on Washington Street were designed by Green & Wicks in the 1890s. A five-story steel frame warehouse building fronting on Washington Street dates to 1911–1912. Connected to it are a warehouse building dating to 1882, one dating to 1906–1907, and one fronting on Ellicott Street and dating to 1912–1913.

Plans announced in January 2010 are for the complex to be converted to apartments and offices. As of 2026, the site still had not been redeveloped.

It was listed on the National Register of Historic Places in 2009.
