= United Office Building =

Historic commercial building in New York, United States

- U.S. National Register of Historic Places
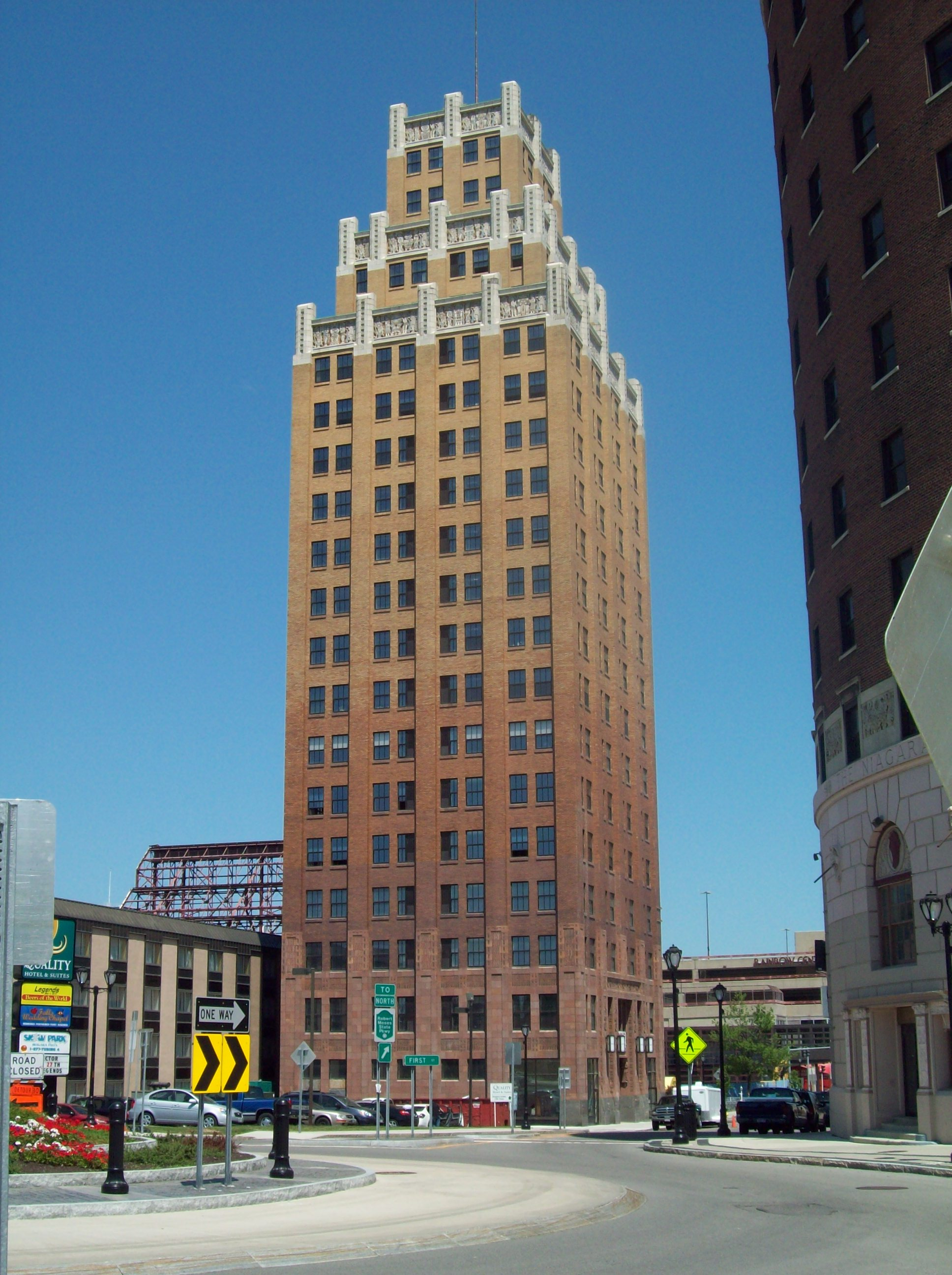
- United Office Building, June 2009

- Location within New York Location within the United States
- Location: 220 Rainbow Blvd., Niagara Falls, New York
- Coordinates: 43°5′14″N 79°3′45″W
- Built: 1929
- Architect: James A. Johnson; Amsterdam Building Co.
- Architectural style: Art Deco
- NRHP reference No.: 05001537
- Added to NRHP: January 18, 2006

United Office Building, now known as The Giacomo, is a historic Mayan Revival skyscraper in Niagara Falls, New York, US.

== Description ==
The United Office Building was designed by architect James A. Johnson of Esenwein & Johnson, one of the most successful architectural firms in Buffalo at the time. It was built by Frank A. Dudley, president of the United Hotels Company of America (later United Hotels of America), and completed in 1929 on the eve of the Great Depression. The building is one of the most important landmarks in downtown Niagara Falls. It is constructed of steel and brick with a terra-cotta facade. The building's Mayan Revival art deco elements of sculpture and pressed terra-cotta brick draw inspiration from the iconography of pre-Columbian Mesoamerican cultures.

The upper five stories of the building include two floors of approximately 3,000 square feet and three top floors of approximately 1,000 square feet each, which were constructed to house mechanical and elevator equipment.

== History ==
The United Office Building, at 20 stories, was the tallest building in Niagara Falls until 2005, when it was surpassed in height by the nearby Seneca Niagara Casino and Hotel. The top floors have views of the American and Horseshoe Falls of Niagara Falls.

=== Renovation ===
The building was abandoned in the 1980s and was vacant for over 25 years.

In 2004, the USA Niagara Development Corporation, a subsidiary to the State's Economic Development Agency, purchased the building for one dollar. Carl Paladino's Ellicott Development Co. undertook extensive renovations of the building, totaling $10 million (equivalent to $14,954,000 in 2025). In 2010, after the renovation, the building was renamed The Giacomo Hotel and Residences, and now houses 17 apartments, office space, and a 49-room hotel, the Giacomo.

The building was listed on the National Register of Historic Places in 2006.

== Gallery ==
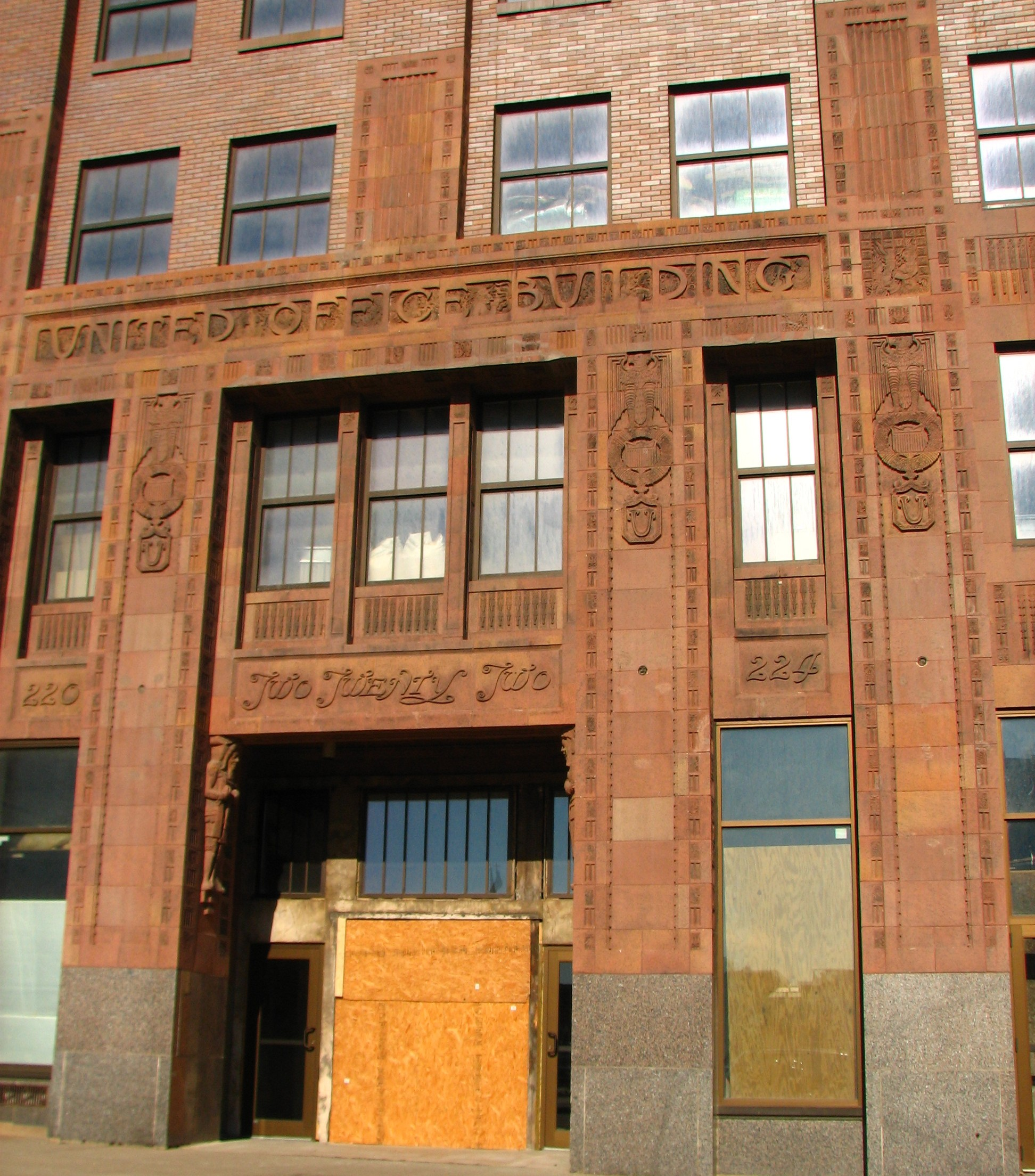
United Office Building front entrance

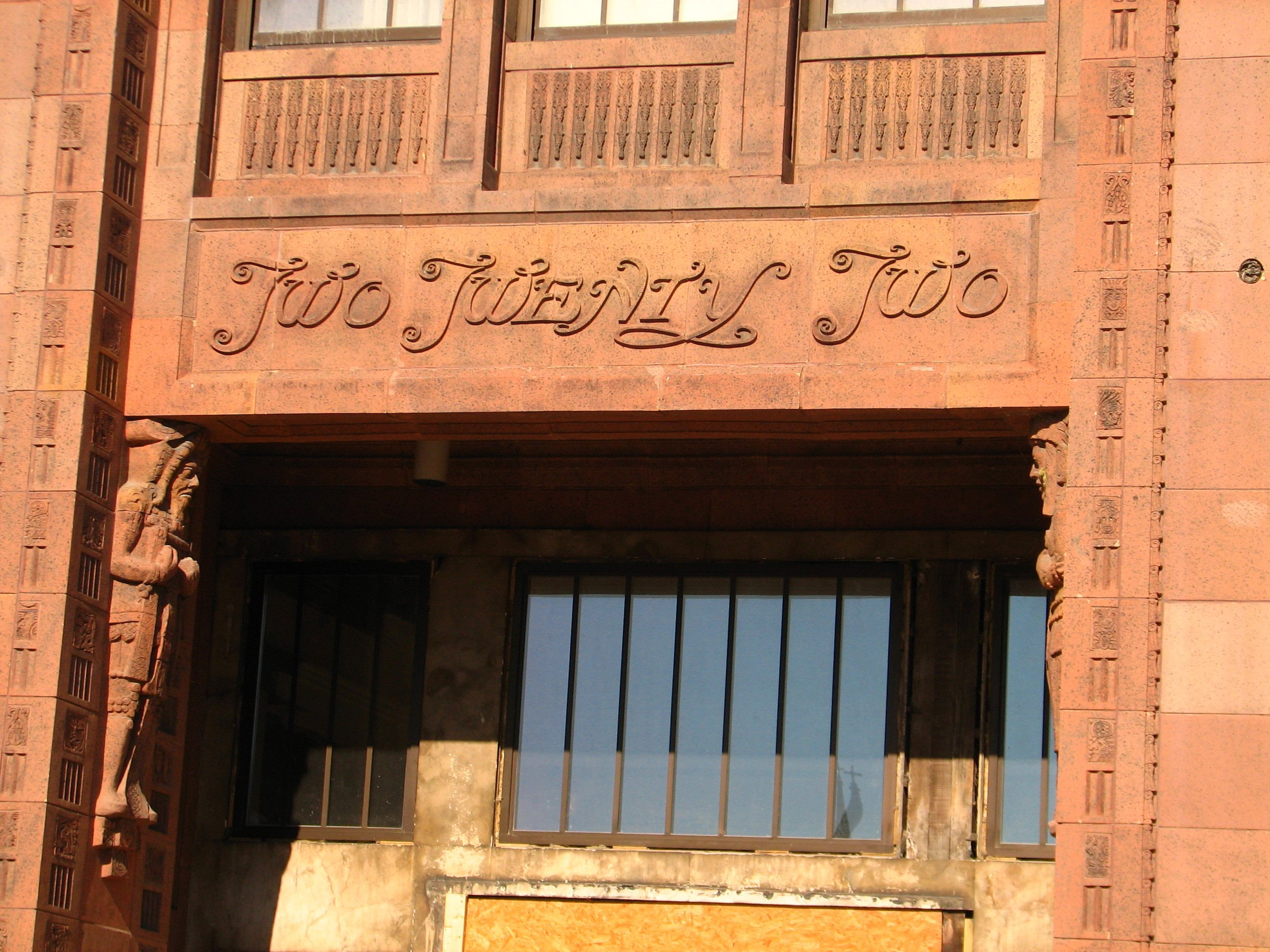
Architectural detail front entrance.

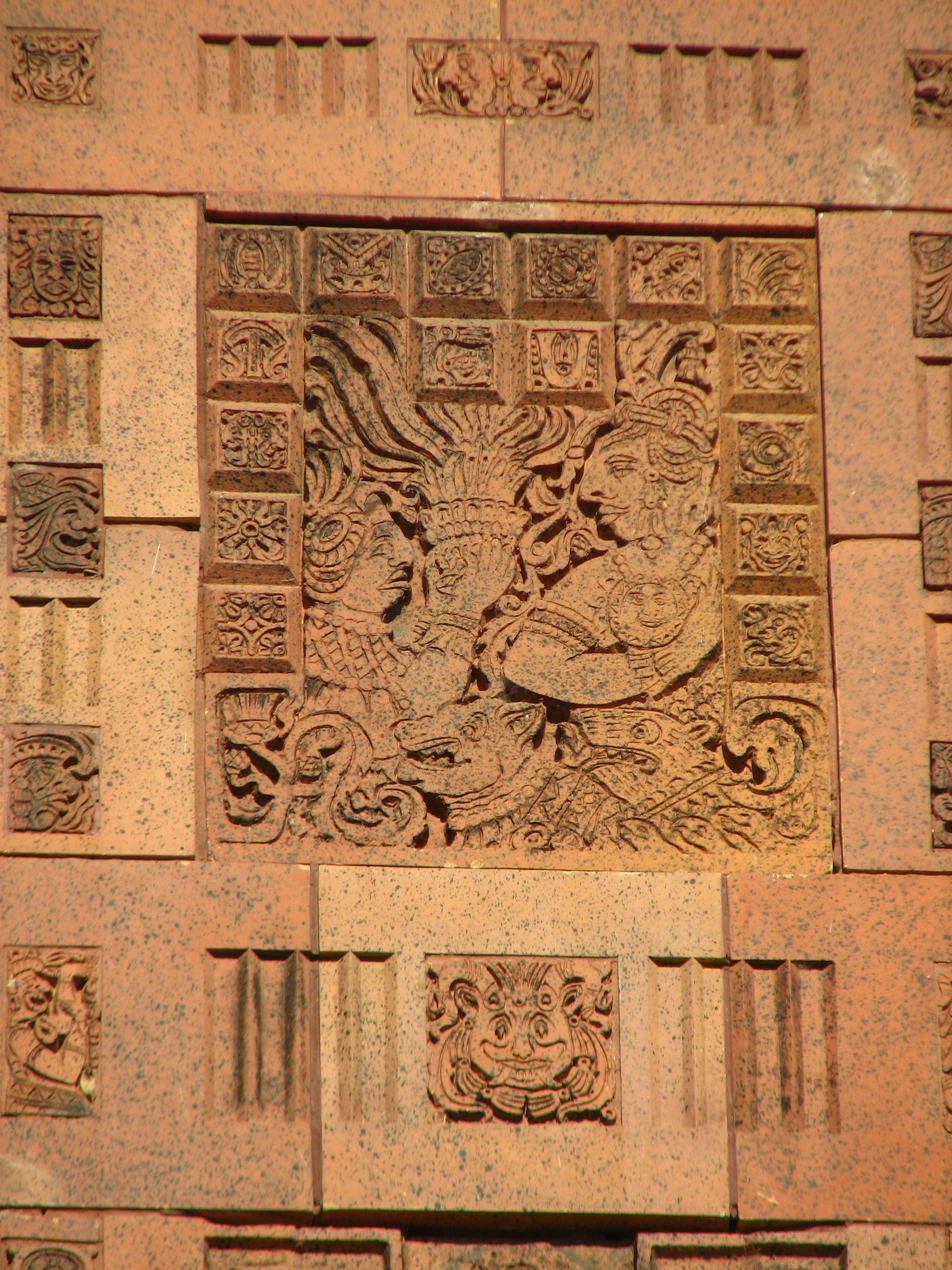
Mayan decorative elements on facade.

== See also ==
- James A. Johnson
- Esenwein & Johnson
- Frank A. Dudley
- National Register of Historic Places listings in Niagara County, New York
- Ellicott Development Co.
