= Pan-American Exposition =

1901 World's Fair in Buffalo, New York

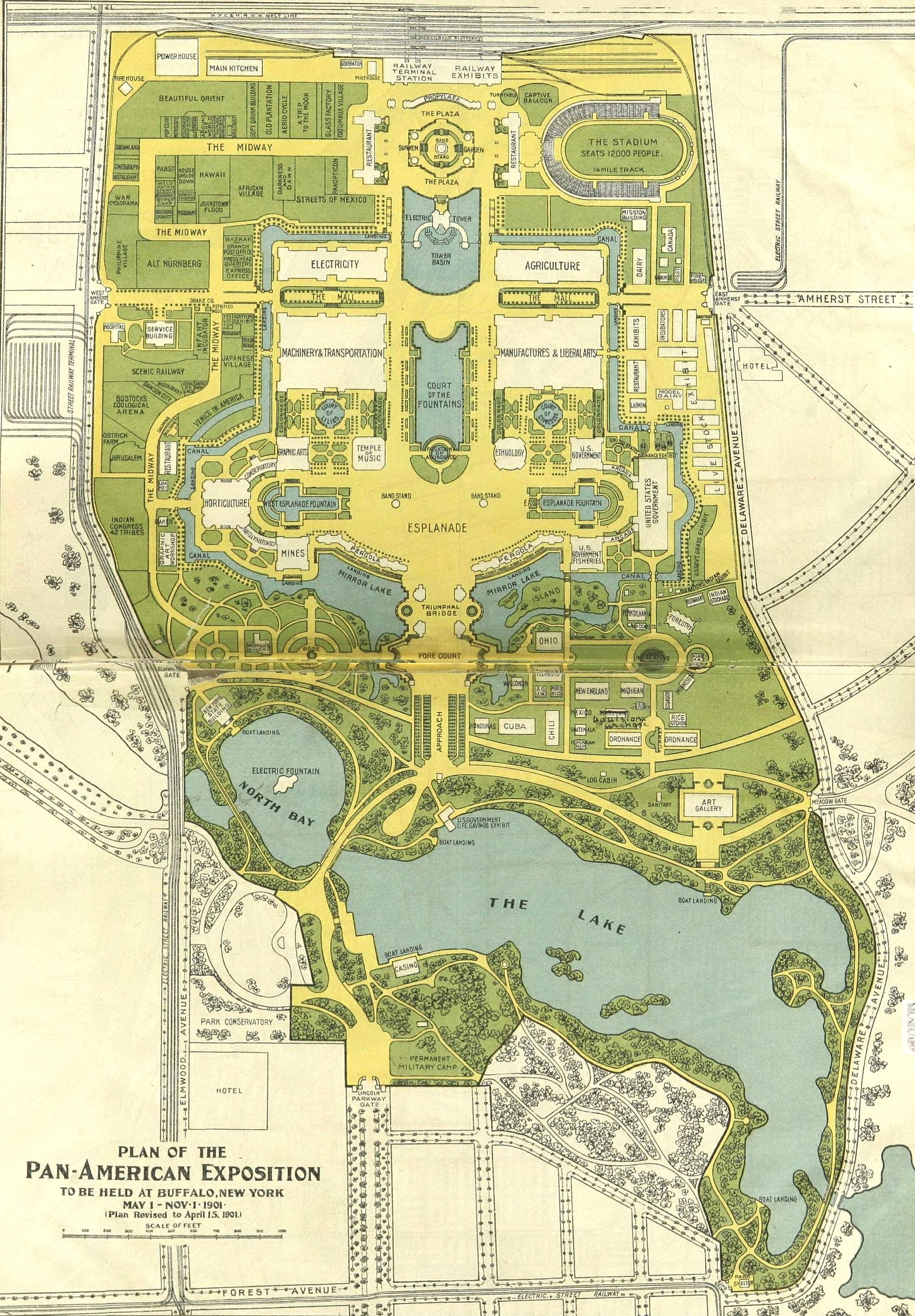
- Pan-American Exposition map

Overview
- BIE-class: Unrecognized exposition
- Name: Pan-American Exposition
- Area: 350 acres (140 ha)
- Visitors: 8,000,000

Location
- Country: United States
- City: Buffalo, New York
- Coordinates: 42°56′26″N 78°52′20″W

Timeline
- Opening: May 1, 1901
- Closure: November 2, 1901

expositions
- Previous: Trans-Mississippi Exposition in Omaha, Nebraska
- Next: Inter-State and West Indian Exposition in Charleston, South Carolina

The Pan-American Exposition was a world's fair held in Buffalo, New York, from May 1 through November 2, 1901. The fair occupied 350 acres (0.55 mi^{2}) of land on the western edge of what is now Delaware Park, extending from Delaware Avenue to Elmwood Avenue and northward to Great Arrow Avenue. It is remembered today primarily for being the location of the shooting of United States president William McKinley at the Temple of Music on September 6, 1901. The exposition was illuminated at night. Thomas A. Edison, Inc. filmed it during the day and captured a pan of it at night.

== History ==
The Pan-American Exposition, often referred to as "The Rainbow City", received national attention in the press and elsewhere a couple of years before, during and after it occurred. During the course of the exposition more than 8,000,000 visitors came to the event.

The event was organized by the Pan-American Exposition Company, formed in 1897. Cayuga Island was initially chosen as the place to hold the Exposition because of the island's proximity to Niagara Falls, which was a huge tourist attraction. When the Spanish–American War broke out in 1898, plans were put on hold. After the war, there was a heated competition between the cities of Buffalo and Niagara Falls over the location. Buffalo won for two main reasons. First, Buffalo had a much larger population; with roughly 350,000 people, it was the eighth-largest city in the United States. Second, Buffalo had better railroad connections; the city was also located on the east shore of Lake Erie and serviced by 12 steamship lines, and was within a day's journey by rail or steamship for over 40 million people. The exposition was distinctive from its predecessors in that it was the first to employ a central theme in its overall design and layout, featuring extensive lighting on and about the buildings and other structures, plus color and sculpture to achieve harmony. It was also the first exposition with a global unifying theme that emphasized the concept of Pan-Americanism.

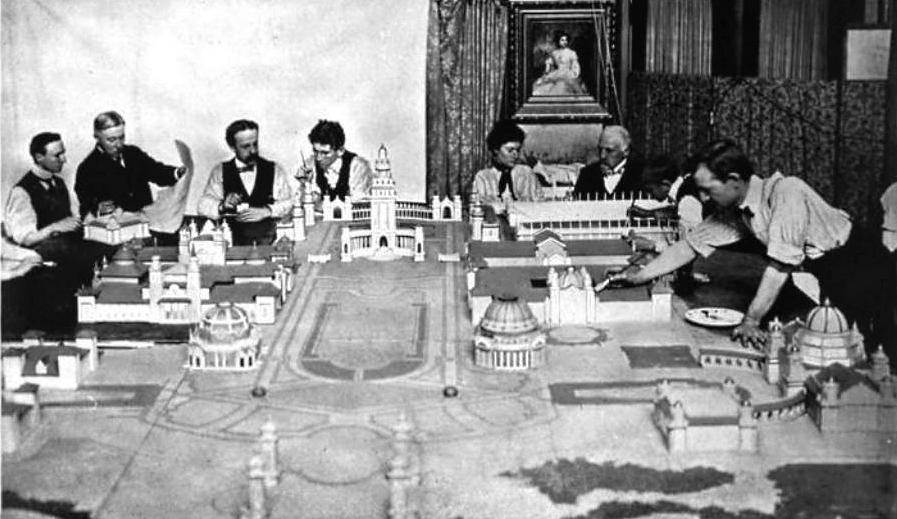
The Planning Committee of the Exposition

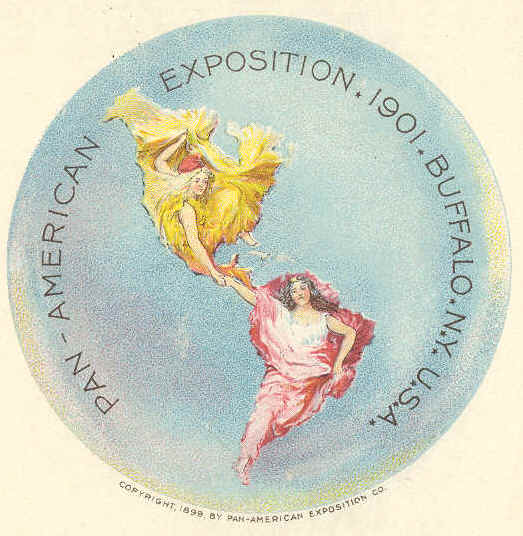
Pan-American Exposition official logo

Pan-American Exposition flag, designed by Adelaide J. Thorpe

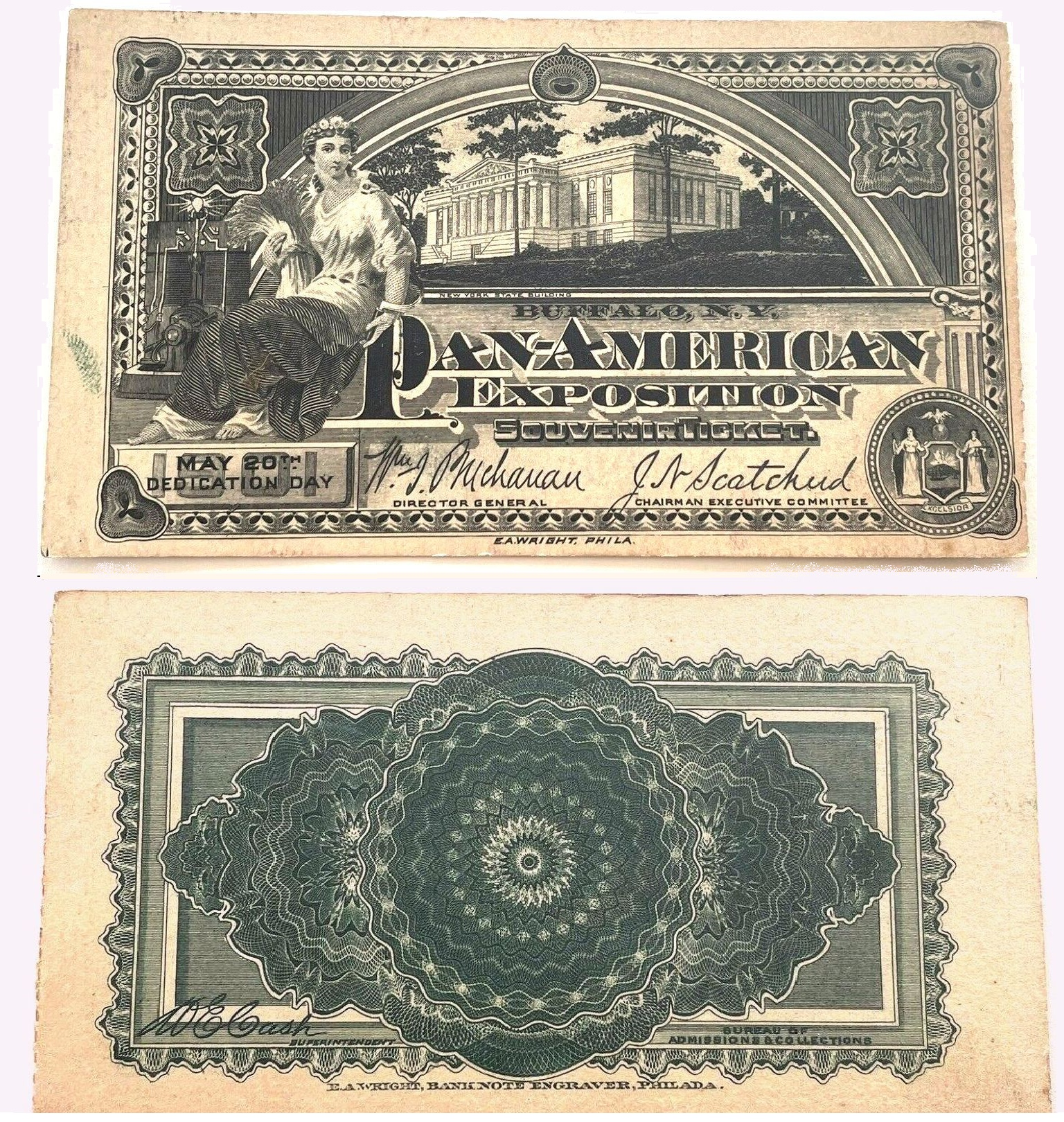
Pan American Exposition ticket, front and back, which cost US$0.50
($19.00 in 2025 dollars)

The planning committee considered some twenty different locations for the exposition and after much consideration and deliberation a 350-acre tract in the western area of Delaware Park was selected. The grounds on which the exposition would be constructed extended from Delaware Ave. to Elmwood and from Park Lake northward to present Great Arrow. The total expense for the exposition came to US$7 million. ($271 million in 2025 dollars.)

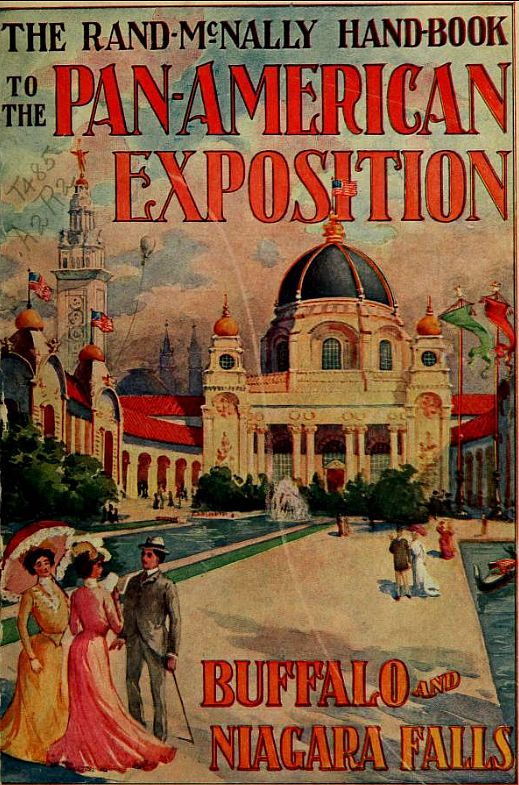
Rand McNally Pan American Exposition Handbook

On March 3, 1899, Congress pledged $500,000 and publicly declared that "it is desirable to encourage the holding of a Pan-American Exposition on the Niagara Frontier in the City of Buffalo, in the year 1901, fittingly to illustrate the marvelous development of the Western Hemisphere during the Nineteenth Century, by a display of the arts, industries, manufactures and the products of the soil, mine and sea..." The "Pan American" theme was carried throughout the event with the slogan "commercial well being and good understanding among the American Republics." The advent of the alternating current power transmission system in the US allowed designers to light the Exposition in Buffalo using power generated 25 mi (40 km) away at Niagara Falls.

In the months preceding the exposition promotional pamphlets, newspaper articles, guide books and other publications were published and released around the United States and elsewhere. Among them were a number of different publications from the Pan-American exposition company in Buffalo, along with publications from Rand McNally in New York. "Put Me Off at Buffalo" was a song used to advertise the Exposition that became popular.

=== Events and attractions ===
At the opening of the Pan-American Exposition on "Dedication Day", May 20, 1901, a procession led by Vice-President Roosevelt, who was attended by a number of dignitaries, which included Governor Odell, of New York, Conrad Diehl, the mayor of Buffalo, Senator Hanna, of Ohio, and Senator Gallinger, of New Hampshire. Leading the military division of the parade was Louis Babcock, Grand Marshal of the Exposition parade, which also included the first division, consisting of the 71st Regiment Band and other military brigades. The procession passed over the monumental Triumphal Bridge which passes over Mirror Lake, and proceeded to the Temple of Music. More than 100,000 people were in attendance. At the temple they listened to various key note speakers, where the idea of "America for the Americans" was emphasized.

Though the Pan-American Exposition featured many exhibits that possessed commercial and transportation and different worldly themes, it was also considered to be an art exhibition, with many American paintings, sculptures and other works of art from Canada and other countries, all of which were displayed in the Exposition's Albright Art Gallery and other locations about the fairgrounds. The Exposition also served to define what was officially to be considered "American Art" at the turn of the century.

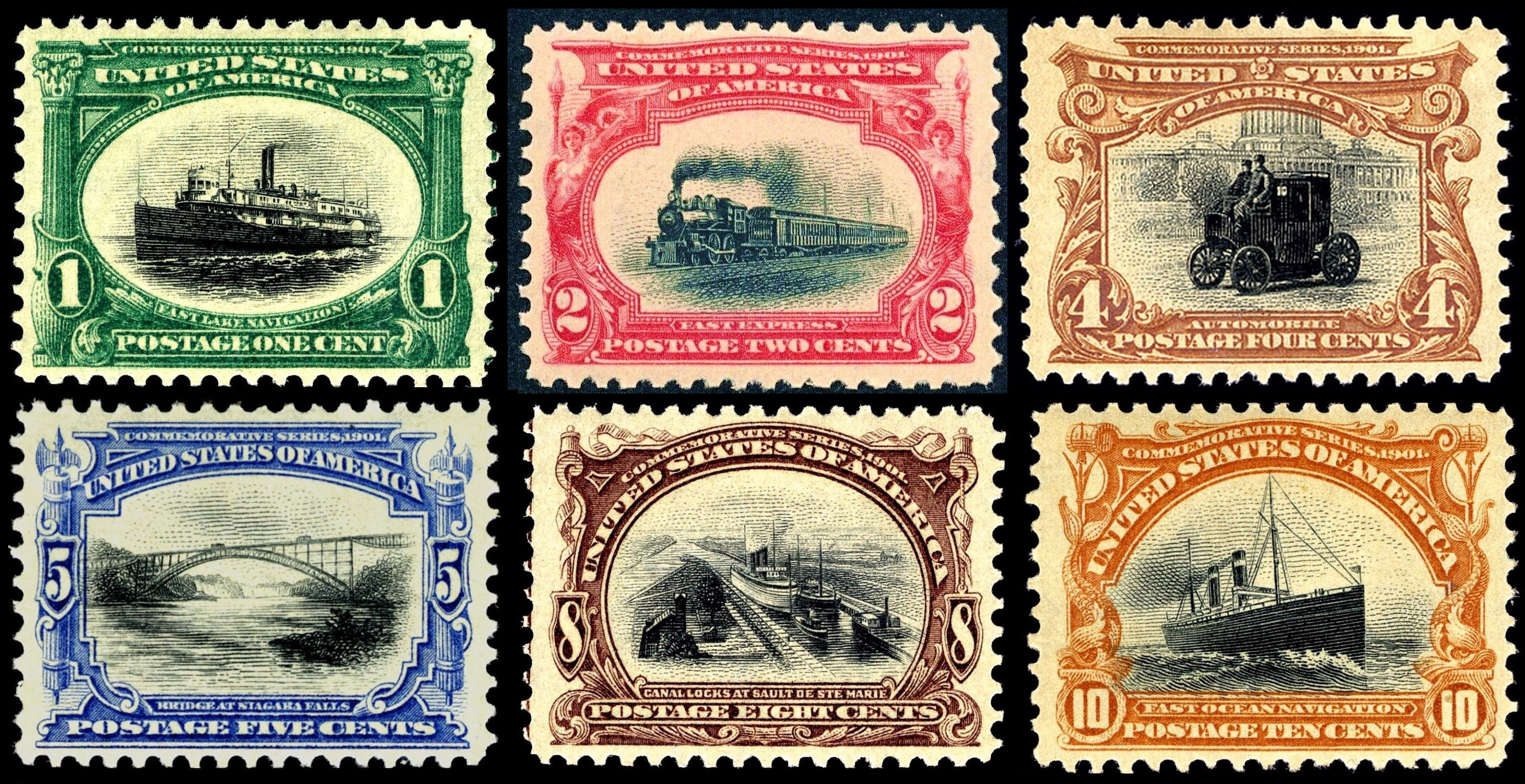
Pan American commemorative issues of 1901 First released at the Exposition

In May 1901 the U.S. Post Office began issuing a series of six commemorative stamps to help promote and fund the exposition. The stamps depicted the various modern transportation themes that were featured at the exposition. The stamps were placed on sale at the exposition from May 1 to October 31, 1901. Post Offices in Buffalo post-marked out-going mail with a number of different specially made postmarks inscribed with the words, "Pan-American Exposition, 1901". The Pan American issues were the first commemorative stamps to be issued in the 20th century.

On September 4, President McKinley arrived and was greeted by thousands of people in anticipation of his visit. Also in September, future Secretary of State William Jennings Bryan visited the exposition and made an appearance at the exhibit of the Bureau of Indian Affairs with several prominent Sioux Indian chiefs, including Red Cloud, High Hawk and Blue Horse. Also present were chiefs from the Six Nations League of the Iroquois Confederacy, dressed in the traditional attire of their ancestors. Arriving during the preparatory stages of the Exposition, they erected various long houses that were once commonplace in their home lands of central New York, while they were attended by various translators.

Lina Beecher, creator of the Flip Flap Railway, attempted to demonstrate one of his looping roller coasters at the fair, but the organizers of the event considered the ride to be too dangerous and refused to allow it on the grounds. Buffalo native Nina Morgana, later a soprano with the Metropolitan Opera, was a child performer in the "Venice in America" attraction at the Exposition. Composer/organist Fannie Morris Spencer gave two recitals in the Temple of Music. Conductor John Lund led the Pan-American Orchestra, a resident professional orchestra at the exhibition.

Pan-American Exposition by Night

Other attractions included The Great Amphitheater, Joshua Slocum's sloop, the Spray, on which he had recently sailed around the world alone, the Trip to the Moon exhibit, a mechanical dark ride that was later housed at Coney Island's Luna Park. In the center of the rose-garden beside the Woman's Building was Enid Yandell's "Struggle of Existence," and a plaster version of the fountain "Struggle of Life" installed in Rhode Island.

On the last day of the exposition, Saturday, November 2, a sham battle was staged at the Stadium at the Pan-American Exhibition. The several hundred participants included the six tribes of American Indians, dressed in traditional garb, and the United States Infantry stationed at Buffalo. The event also included theatrical explosive charges, weaponry and many hand to hand combat encounters, and was said to be realistic in its presentation.

=== Shooting of President McKinley ===
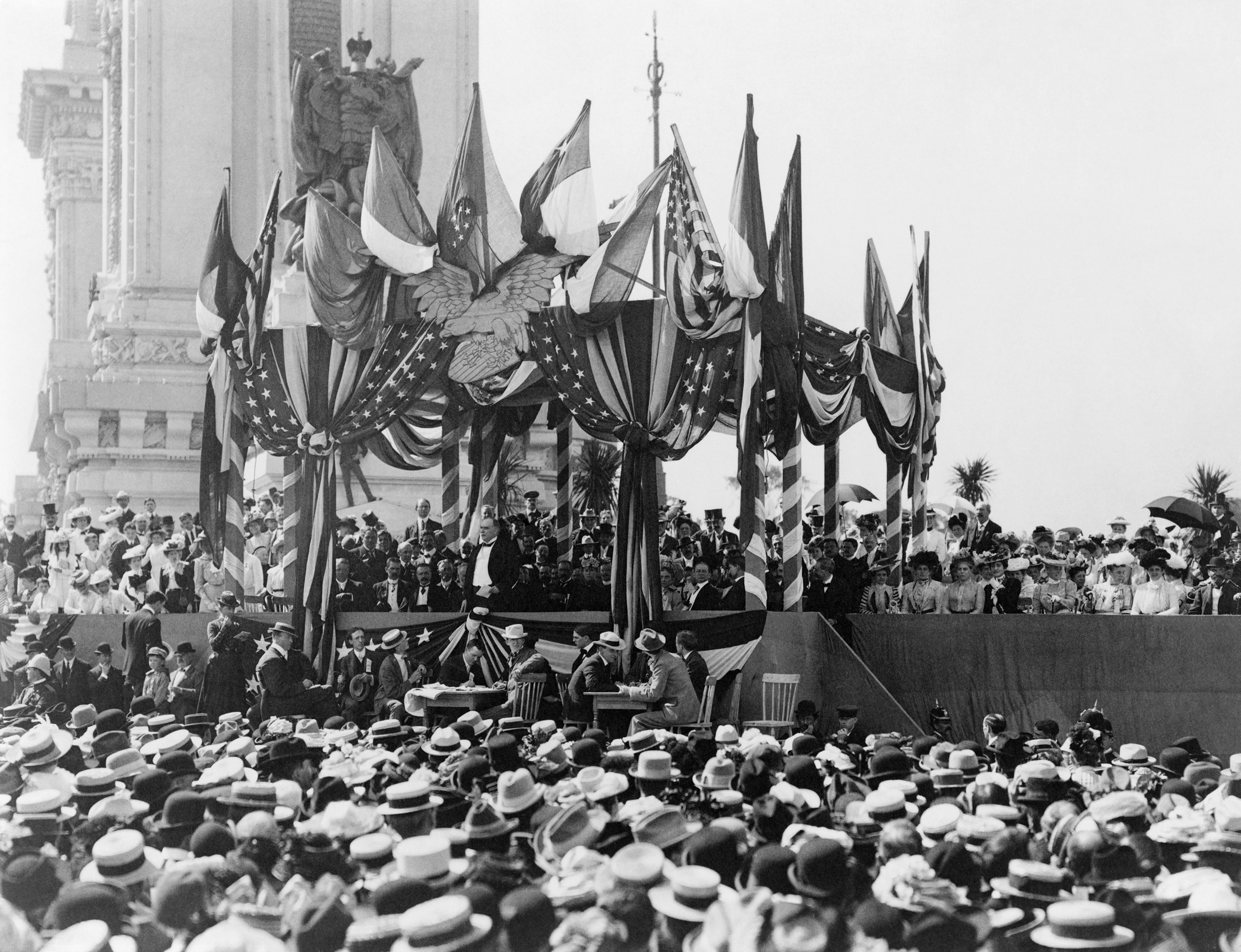
McKinley's last speech delivered September 5, 1901.

The exposition is often remembered because it was the location where United States President William McKinley was shot by an anarchist, Leon Czolgosz, at the Temple of Music on September 6, 1901.

McKinley's presence at the Exposition was widely advertised by newspapers and magazines which played a significant role in attracting many thousands of people to the event. Of his visit to the exposition, McKinley's secretary of State, John Hay, remarked, "Never had I seen him higher in hope and patriotic confidence."

His arrival was the source of great concern for the Secret Service, the Exposition police and others who were assigned to McKinley's security. The year before a plot to kill the president had been discovered, while two other world leaders had recently been assassinated. Normally people who would draw near to the president were required to have their hands empty and in plain sight, but for reasons not clear, this rule was not strictly enforced.

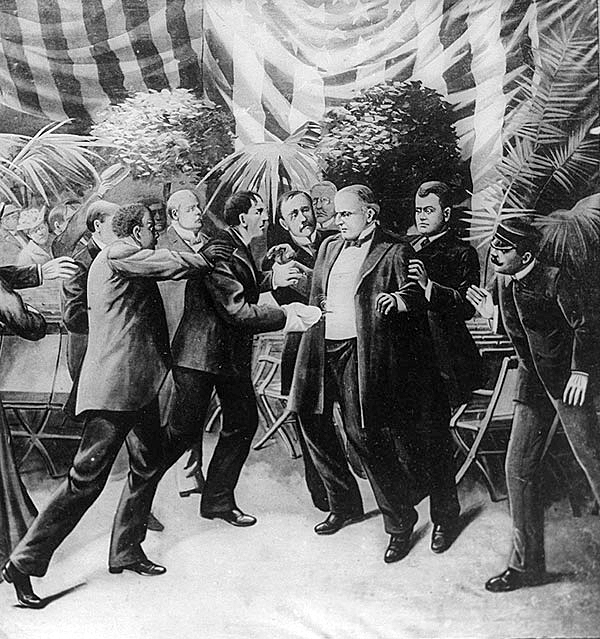
Drawing by T. Dart Walker depicting the shooting of McKinley, September 6.

On the day prior to the shooting, McKinley had given an address at the exposition, which began as follows:

I am glad to be again in the city of Buffalo and exchange greetings with her people ... Expositions are the timekeepers of progress. They record the world's advancement. They stimulate the energy, enterprise, and intellect of the people; and quicken human genius. They go into the home. They broaden and brighten the daily life of the people. They open mighty storehouses of information to the student.

The day after, McKinley appeared in the Temple of Music to shake hands with attendees. Czolgosz was in the line, and hid a revolver beneath a handkerchief he had wrapped around his right hand. When he reached McKinley, he shot him twice. James Benjamin Parker, who had been standing behind Czolgosz in line, grabbed Czolgosz and the revolver before he could fire a third shot. Other individuals jumped in and beat Czolgosz severely. McKinley urged the mob to spare his assiliant. The newly developed X-ray machine was displayed at the fair, but doctors were reluctant to use it on McKinley to search for the bullet because they did not know what side effects it might have had on him. Also, the operating room at the exposition's emergency hospital did not have any electric lighting, even though the exteriors of many of the buildings were covered with thousands of light bulbs. Doctors used a pan to reflect sunlight onto the operating table as they treated McKinley's wounds. The President died eight days later on September 14 from gangrene caused by the bullet wounds. McKinley's last words, from a favorite hymn, were, "Nearer my God to Thee, Nearer to Thee". Czolgosz was tried, found guilty, and sentenced to death by electric chair.

== Buildings and exhibits ==
Buildings and exhibits featured at the Pan-American Exposition included:

| Image | Building | Architect | Status | Notes |
|---|---|---|---|---|
| | Agricultural, Manufacturers, and Liberal Arts Buildings | George Shepley | Demolished | The Agriculture building faced the Court of Fountain. |
| | Electric Tower | John Galen Howard | Demolished | The fair's center piece |
| | Electricity Building | Green & Wicks | Demolished | |
| | Ethnology Building | George Cary | Demolished | |
| | U.S. Government Building | James Knox Taylor | Demolished | The building occupied the entire eastern Esplanade of the Exposition grounds. |
| | Machinery and Transportation Building | Green & Wicks | Demolished | |
| | Mines, Forestry and Graphic Arts Buildings | Robert Swain Peabody | Demolished | The buildings were the first series of buildings a visitor encountered after passing through the Triumphal Bridge. |
| | New York State Building | George Cary | Extant | Constructed of Vermont Marble. |
| | Service Building | Esenwein & Johnson | Demolished | First building completed on the grounds. |
| | Stadium | Babb, Cook & Willard | Demolished | Modeled after the Panathenaic Stadium. |
| | Temple of Music | Esenwein & Johnson | Demolished | Center for the live performances |
| | Woman's Building | | Demolished | Former club house of the Country Club of Buffalo. |
| | Fair Japan | | Demolished | Organized by Kushibiki and Arai. |

== Demolition ==
When the fair ended, the contents of the grounds were sold to the Chicago House Wrecking Company of Chicago for US$92,000 ($3.1 million in 2025 dollars). Demolition of the buildings began in March 1902, and within a year, most of the buildings were demolished. The grounds were then cleared and subdivided to be used for residential streets, homes, and park land. Similar to previous world fairs, most of the buildings were constructed of timber and steel framing with precast staff panels made of a plaster/fiber mix. These buildings were built as a means of rapid construction and temporary ornamentation and not made to last. Prior to its demolition, an effort was made via public committee to purchase and preserve the original Electric Tower from the wrecking company for nearly US$30,000 ($1.16 million in 2025 dollars). However, the necessary funding could not be raised in time.

The site of the exposition was bounded by Elmwood Avenue on the west, Delaware Avenue on the east, what is now Hoyt Lake on the south, and the railway on the north. It is now occupied by a residential neighborhood from Nottingham Terrace to Amherst Street, and businesses on the north side of Amherst Street. A stone and marker on a traffic island dividing Fordham Drive, near the Lincoln Parkway, marks the area where the Temple of Music was located.

== Legacy ==
- The New York State Building, located in Delaware Park, was designed to outlast the Exposition and has been the home of the Buffalo History Museum since 1902. Designated a National Historic Landmark in 1987, it can be visited at the corner of Elmwood Avenue and Nottingham Avenue. The Museum's Research Library has an online bibliography of its extensive Pan-American holdings. Included in the Library collection are the records of the Pan-American Exposition Company.
- The Albright-Knox Art Gallery was intended to serve as a Fine Arts Pavilion but due to construction delays, it was not completed in time.
- While the original Electric Tower may have inspired the 13 story Beaux-Arts General Electric Tower, built in 1912 in downtown Buffalo, the General Electric building is not a faithful replica.
- The Hotel Statler was demolished after 1901. Ellsworth Statler then built a second Buffalo hotel in 1907, then a third in 1923.
- A boulder with a plaque and a flagpole marking the site of McKinley's assassination was placed in the grassy median on Fordham Drive in Buffalo.
- At least one engine from the miniature railway that carried visitors around the fair was preserved. It is currently privately owned and operated in Braddock Heights, Maryland.

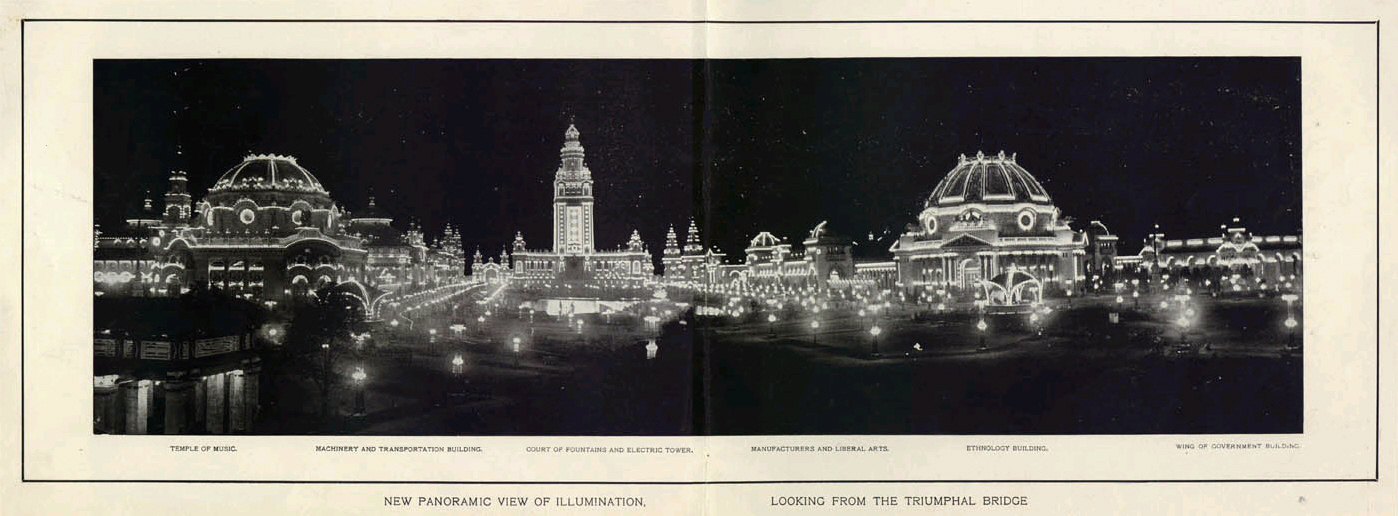
Pan-American Exhibition, panorama view, from The Latest and Best Views of the Pan-American Exposition, Buffalo, N.Y.: Robert Allen Reid, 1901.

== See also ==
- List of world's fairs
- List of world expositions
- Louisiana Purchase Exposition held in 1904
- Raphael Beck, artist
- World's Columbian Exposition held in 1893

== Bibliography ==
- Arnold, C.D. (1901). Official views of Pan-American exposition. Buffalo, N.Y.: C. D. Arnold.
- Bewley, Michael Ryan (Spring 2003). "The New World in Unity: Pan-America Visualized at Buffalo in 1901". New York History. 84 (2). Fenimore Art Museum: 179–203. JSTOR 23183322.
- Brush, Edward Hale (November 1900). "Six Nations Village at the Pan-American Exposition". Scientific American. Vol. 83, no. 19. Scientific American. JSTOR 26121307.
- "The Pan-American Exposition of 1901". Scientific American. January 27, 1900.
- Margaret Creighton (October 18, 2016). Electrifying Fall of Rainbow City: Spectacle and Assassination at the 1901 World's Fair. ISBN 978-0-521-43336-5.
- Goodrich, Arthur (August 1901). "Short Stories of Interesting Exhibits". The World's Work: A History of Our Time. Vol. II. pp. 1054–1096.
- Hay, John (1902). William McKinley. Washington DC: Washington.
- Olcitt, Charles S. (1916). William McKinley. New York and Boston: Houghton, Mifflin.
- Page, Walter H. (August 1901). "The Pan-American Exposition". The World's Work: A History of Our Time. Vol. II. pp. 1014–1048.
- Official catalogue and guide book to the Pan-American Exposition: With Maps of Exhibitions and Illustrations. Buffalo, NY: Charles Ahrhart. 1901.
- The Rand-McNally hand book to the Pan-American exposition. Chicago and New York: Rand, McNally & co. 1901.
- "Opening of the Pan-American Exposition". Scientific American. Vol. 84, no. 22. Scientific American. June 1901. pp. 338–339. JSTOR 24982219.
- Peterson, Harold F. (2003). "Buffalo Builds the 1901 Pan-American Exposition". Buffalo as History. Archived from the original on August 12, 2011.
- Leech, Margaret (1959). In the days of McKinley. New York: Harper & Brothers.
- Walker, John Brisben (1901). "The cosmopolitan : an illustrated monthly magazine, September, 1901 : souvenir number of the Buffalo Exposition". Cosmopolitan Magazine. New York: Cosmopolitan Magazine.
- "Opening, Pan-American Exposition". Library of Congress. 1901.
- "The Buffalo History Works; The Buildings / Midway". The Buffalo History Works; The Midway.
- "Panama-Pacific Exposition Issue". Smithsonian national postal Museum.
