= M. Wile and Company Factory Building =

- U.S. National Register of Historic Places
- New York State Register of Historic Places
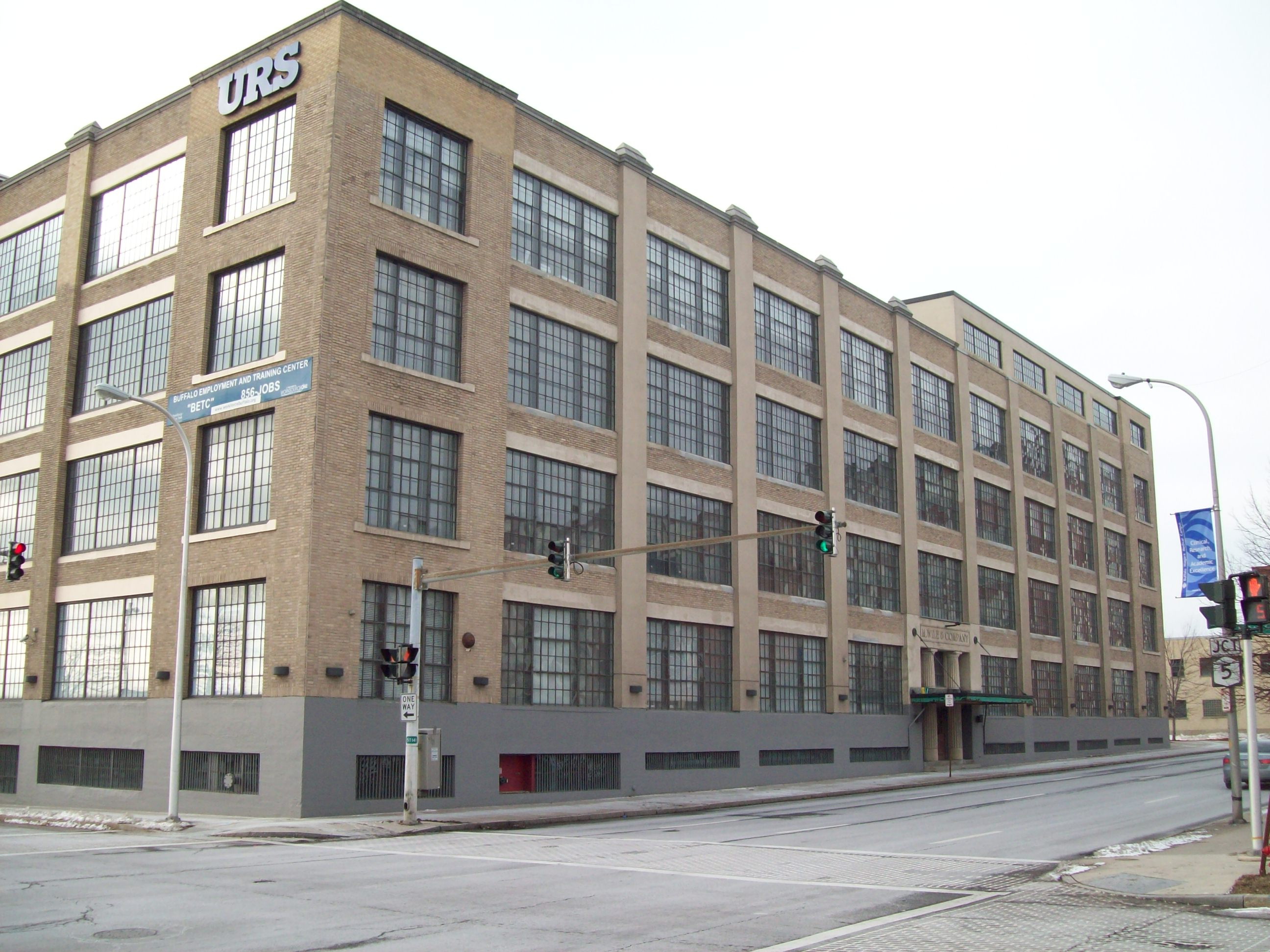
- M. Wile and Company Factory Building, December 2009

- Location within New York Location within the United States
- Location: 77 Goodell St., Buffalo, New York
- Coordinates: 42°53′40″N 78°52′7″W
- Area: less than one acre
- Built: 1924
- Architect: Esenwein and Johnson
- NRHP reference No.: 00001419
- NYSRHP No.: 02940.006026

Significant dates
- Added to NRHP: November 22, 2000
- Designated NYSRHP: September 25, 2000

M. Wile and Company Factory Building is a historic garment factory located at Buffalo in Erie County, New York. It is an early and significant example of the "Daylight Factory." The four-story building, erected in 1924, is constructed of reinforced concrete and features curtain walls of metal sash windows. It was home to M. Wile & Company until 1999; a major manufacturer of men's suits, founded by Mayer Wile in Buffalo in 1877. In 1969, the company became a subsidiary of Hartmarx.

In 2007, plans were announced for redevelopment of the historic factory building as part of the Buffalo Niagara Medical Campus. The first floor of the building is occupied by the Buffalo Employment and Training Center.

It was listed on the National Register of Historic Places in 2000.
