= Hotel Utica =

Historical hotel in Utica, New York

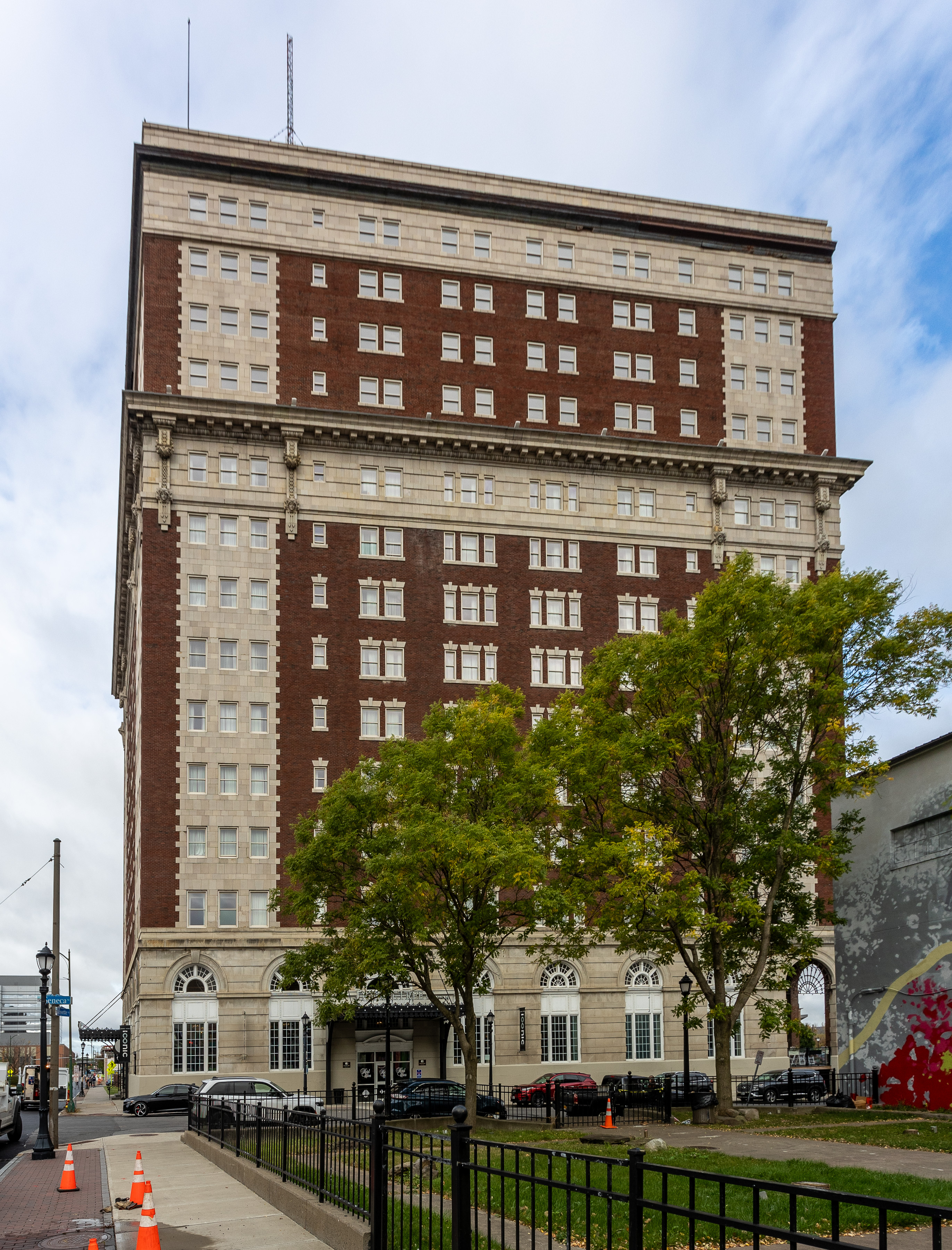

- Location within New York

General information
- Location: 102 Lafayette St; Utica, New York
- Coordinates: 43.102624°N 75.230829°W
- Opened: 1912
- Owner: DoubleTree by Hilton
- Operator: Visions Hotels

Technical details
- Floor count: 13

Design and construction
- Architect: Esenwein & Johnson

Other information
- Number of rooms: 250
- Number of restaurants: 1

Website
- Official website

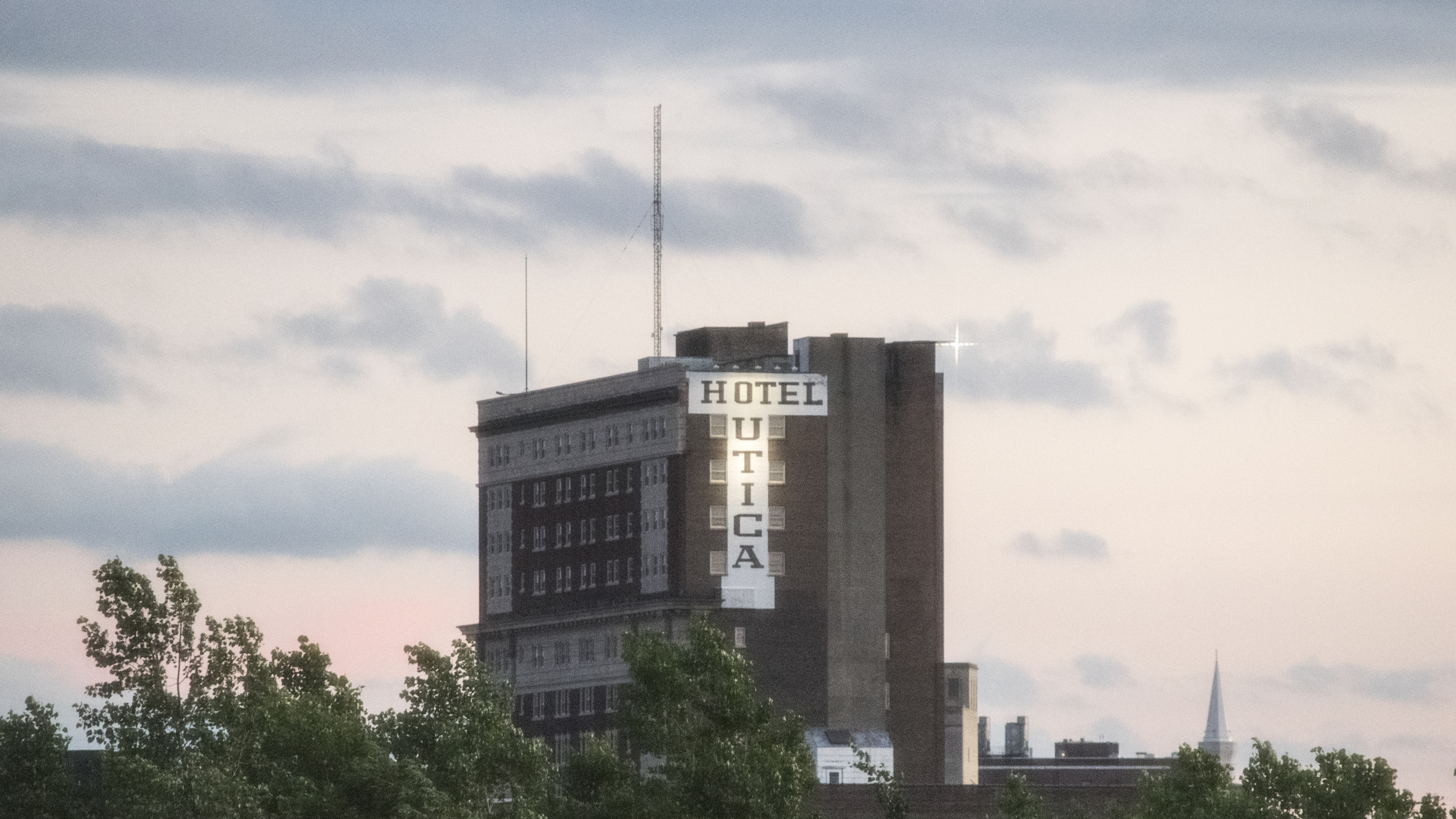
Hotel Utica as seen from the Utica Harbor

The Hotel Utica is a historic hotel building in Utica, New York. It was designed by Esenwein & Johnson, an architectural firm from Buffalo, for United Hotels Company of America. The hotel was restored with public funding and reopened in 2001. Since 2017 it has been named Doubletree by Hilton Hotel Utica.

== History ==
The Hotel Utica opened on March 11, 1912. It was originally a 10-story building of fireproof construction with 200 rooms, four dining rooms, a ballroom, an assembly hall, a restaurant for ladies and a grill and cafe for gentlemen. The top three floors were added in 1926, which increased the total number of rooms to 250. Famous guests included Judy Garland, Mickey Mantle, President Franklin Delano Roosevelt and Mrs. Eleanor Roosevelt, Hopalong Cassidy, Mae West, Bobby Darin, and then-current Vice President Dick Cheney.

As business declined, the hotel ceased operating in 1972. It then became two adult care residences, the Hunter House and then Loretto Adult Residence. After a period of vacancy, it was purchased by local investors Joseph R. Carucci and Charles N. Gaetano. They undertook a $13 million rehabilitation from 1999-2001 that was patterned on the restoration of the Willard Hotel in Washington, DC.

Loan payments were a problem for the hotel and the City of Utica, which had been spending around $500,000 a year to cover unmet obligations. The nearby Radisson Hotel has had a special assessment deal on its taxes. The Hotel Utica was listed for sale at $10.7 million in 2009. For years Carucci and Gaetano failed to pay property and school taxes, and fell behind on the remaining $6.3 million on what originally was a $5 million U.S. Department of Housing and Urban Development loan. In 2006 the Hotel Utica became a franchise of the hotel chain Choice Hotels International, though ownership remained private.

In May 2016 Hotel Utica was purchased by the hotel management company Visions Hotels. The Corning, NY, based company currently owns and operates over 40 hotels in New York state including several already in Utica. Renovations at Hotel Utica started in the fall of 2016, after Visions Hotels secured an agreement with Hilton Worldwide to complete a Property Improvement Plan and convert to the hotel chain DoubleTree by Hilton. The hotel celebrated its grand reopening as the Doubletree by Hilton Hotel Utica on October 24, 2017.

On August 13, 2018, Donald Trump spoke at a fundraiser for congresswoman Claudia Tenney at the Hotel Utica. This was the first time a president had visited the Hotel Utica, and the Mohawk Valley, in nearly 70 years.
