= Karen Pini =

Australian television presenter and beauty queen (born 1957)

- Born: Karen Jo Pini; 30 July 1957 (age 69); Perth, Western Australia
- Occupations: Model; actress; television presenter
- Spouse(s): Stephen Fitzsimmons (m. 1980, divorced) Garry Carpenter
- Awards: Miss West Coast 1976; Miss Australasia Beachgirl 1976; Miss World 1976 (1st Runner-up)
- Website: www.karenpini.com.au

Karen Jo Pini (born 30 July 1957) is an Australian actress, model, TV personality and beauty pageant titleholder. She represented her country at the 1976 Miss World pageant held in London, United Kingdom and finished first runner up. She was also the nude centerfold in the first Australian edition of Playboy magazine in February 1979. Pini also co-hosted the weekly televised New South Wales lotto draw for twelve years.

== Career ==
=== Modelling ===
In 1976 Pini entered her first beauty pageant, winning the title of Miss West Coast. As a result, she automatically qualified for the Miss Australasia Beachgirl competition, which was held in Perth in March that year. Pini won that title, qualifying her to enter the Quest of Quests pageant, a competition to select the Australian entrants for the Miss Universe and Miss World contests. She was selected as the Miss World representative for Australia and Australia's Golden Dream Girl. In November she appeared at the 1976 Miss World pageant held at Royal Albert Hall in London, where she was chosen as first runner up to the winner Cindy Breakspeare from Jamaica.

After the Miss World Contest she toured England and Scotland, calling games of bingo. Pini also appeared as a topless "Page 3 girl" in The Sun newspaper and was the cover model for the December 1977 US edition of Penthouse magazine. She was photographed in France by Patrick Lichfield for the 1979 Unipart calendar. In 1978 she returned to Australia and was selected as the inaugural Australian Playmate of the Month, appearing in the first Australian edition of Playboy magazine, which was issued in February 1979.

=== Television ===
On 5 November 1979 Pini made her first television appearance on Channel Nine, hosting the weekly New South Wales Lotto draw with Mike Walsh, a role she held for twelve years. Between 1979 and 1982 she appeared in the Australian soap opera The Young Doctors, in the role as Nurse Sherry Andrews. The series was Australia's first medical drama and followed the lives of the doctors, nurses, administrators, and patients of the fictitious Albert Memorial Hospital. It screened on the Nine Network for 1,396 episodes (from 1976 until 1983) making it one of Australia's longest-running television drama series. She also made several appearances on The Paul Hogan Show, a popular Australian comedy show that aired on Australian television from 1973 until 1984, starring Paul Hogan.

== Personal life ==
On 3 December 1980 Pini married Stephen Fitzsimmons, a real estate executive, in Bunbury. Fitzsimmons was also Pini's second cousin. She is currently married to Garry Carpenter and resides in Camden Haven, New South Wales.

== Filmography ==
=== Television ===
Year	Title	Role	Notes
1979–1982	The Young Doctors	Nurse Sherry Andrews	
1979–1991	Go Lotto	Co-host (with Brian Bury)	
1980	The Paul Hogan Show	Various roles	
1982	Beauty and the Beast	Panellist	
1987–1988	Home Shopping Show	Co-host (with Brian Bury)	
2007	Where Are They Now?	Guest (with The Young Doctors cast)	1 episode
