= Quizz =

Jamaican media personality (born 1977)

Carrie "Quizz" Sigurdson
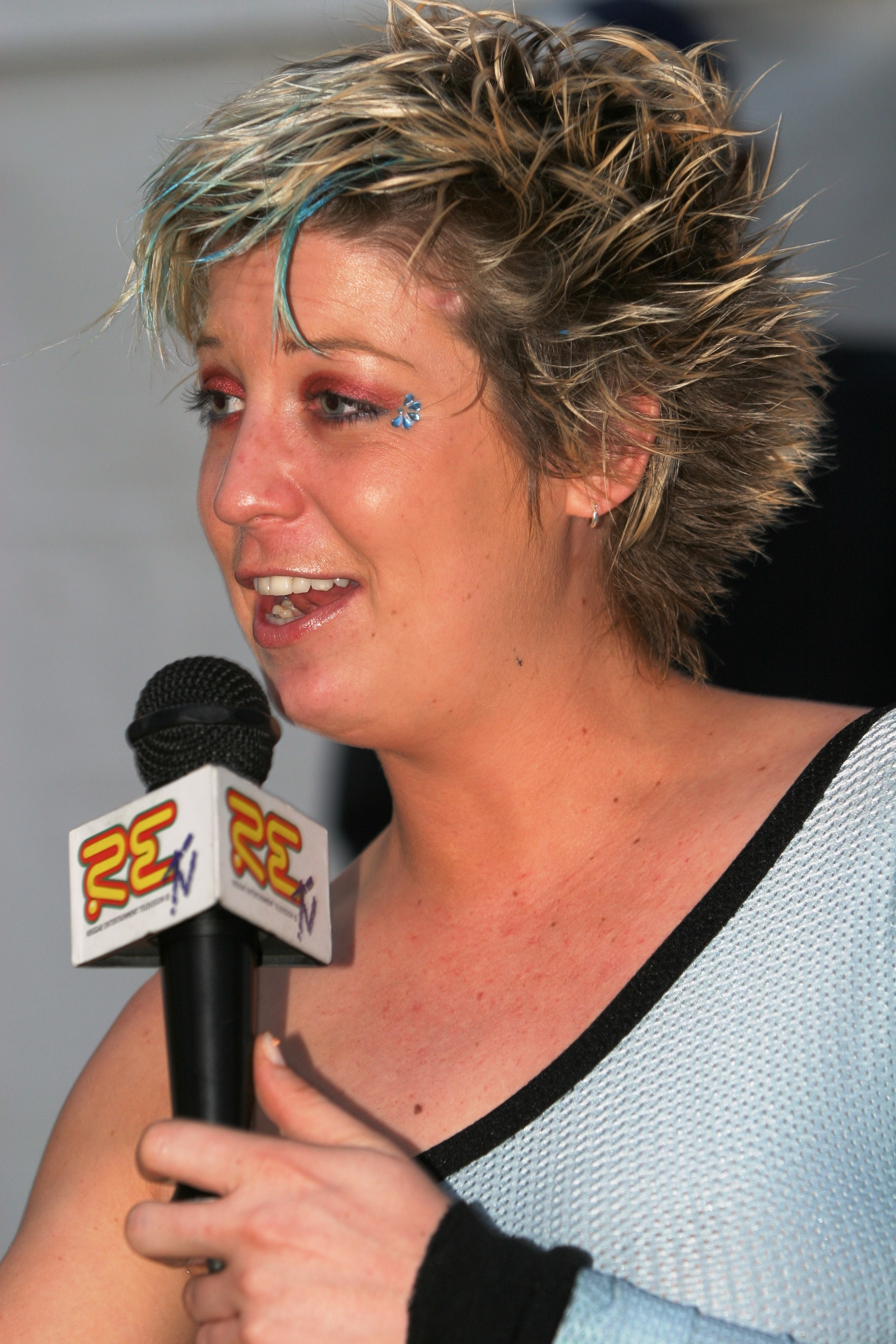
- Quizz in 2002
- Born: Carol Kathleen Sigurdson; 4 December 1977 (age 48); Tehran, Iran
- Years active: 1997–present
- Known for: WHADDAT.com, RETV, YUSH, Tea Tree Crêperie
- Website: carriesigurdson.com bumboclaat.com

Carol Kathleen Sigurdson (born 4 December 1977) better known to friends and family as Carrie and professionally as Quizz is a Jamaican media personality and brand marketing consultant best known for her role in Jamaican media houses Reggae Entertainment TV (RETV) and Whaddat.com in the early 2000s as well as for the party, YUSH and Dream Weekend. Quizz parted ways with RETV in 2008 after she was involved in a near fatal car accident though she is still very active on the Jamaican social media scene, especially TikTok.

In 2011, Quizz and her mother, Maree Sigurdson opened Tea Tree Crêperie, a popular restaurant in Kingston, Jamaica.

== Early life and career ==
Quizz was born in Tehran, Iran to Canadian diplomats. The family moved to Kingston, Jamaica in 1985. Quizz's mother remained in Kingston after the posting had ended and after a 2-year stint in London, England with her father, Quizz returned to Jamaica at age 12. She attended Immaculate Conception High School (Jamaica) in Kingston and OCAD University and York University in Toronto, Canada where she majored in Advertising Design. She has 2 older brothers.

Quizz began her stint in the Jamaican music industry as a rapper/deejay in 1997 with a side job in PR and graphic design, working with Solid Agency in 1999 and as a freelancer but began capturing popular culture through the lens with the creation of WHADDAT.com in 2000 and RETV in 2002. The first YUSH party was in 2003 and she retired as an event promoter after Dream Weekend 2014 to focus on her restaurant.

In 2020, Quizz joined the Red Stripe team as consultant and designer for the new Red Stripe Experience at Rick's Café in Negril.
