= Cindy Breakspeare =

Canadian-Jamaican musician and beauty queen (born 1954)

- Breakspeare in 1976
- Born: Cynthia Jean Cameron Breakspeare; 24 October 1954 (age 72); Toronto, Ontario, Canada
- Education: Immaculate Conception High School
- Occupations: Singer; musician; model
- Spouses: Tom Tavares-Finson (m. 1981; div. 1994) Rupert Bent II (m. 1999; died 2026)
- Children: 3; including Damian Marley and eight grandchildren
- Beauty pageant titleholder
- Title: Miss World 1976
- Years active: 1972–present
- Musical career
- Genre: Jazz

Cynthia Jean Cameron Breakspeare (born 24 October 1954) is a Canadian-Jamaican jazz singer and beauty queen. She was crowned Miss World 1976. She is the mother of reggae musician Damian Marley, a result of her affair with Bob Marley, who remained married to Rita Marley until his death.

== Life and career ==
Breakspeare was born in Toronto, Ontario, Canada, to a white Jamaican father, Louis Cameron Breakspeare and a Canadian mother of British origin, Marguerite Cochrane. She has three brothers and one sister.

Breakspeare moved to Jamaica when she was four years old, and attended the Immaculate Conception High School, graduating in 1973. As a teenager, she participated in beauty pageants, including Miss Jamaica Body Beautiful and Miss Universe Bikini.

Breakspeare was invited to participate in the Miss World competition in 1976 held in London. Despite Jamaica's 1970s government banning Jamaicans from participating in competitions that included South Africa under its apartheid rules, she accepted the invitation and won the title on 19 November 1976, becoming the second Jamaican to do so. Breakspeare did not face the backlash from society that Lawrence Rowe and the South African rebel tours cricketers got for doing similar during that time period.

== Personal life ==
Breakspeare had an affair with reggae musician Bob Marley beginning in 1976, lasting until 1980. Despite being married to Rita Marley, Marley was in relationships with several other women around this time, including Pascaline Bongo, and Yvette Anderson who gave birth to his child in 1981. From Cindy's extramarital affair with Marley she gave birth to a son, Damian Marley in 1978. Three years later, Breakspeare married senator Tom Tavares-Finson on 19 July 1981 (two months after Bob's death), with whom she has a son, Christian (b. 1982), and a daughter, Leah (b. 1986). Breakspeare and Tavares-Finson later divorced in 1994. Breakspeare married musician Rupert Bent II in 1999. She has been pursuing her career as a recording artist and entrepreneur. She founded a Rastafarian craft store called Ital Craft in Jamaica. Breakspeare has six grandsons from her three children. She remains a personality in Jamaica, occasionally featuring in local media.

In February 2024, Breakspeare faced major backlash from the public after posting a birthday tribute to Bob Marley and wrote about their affair in great detail. Many sided with Rita Marley, Bob’s widow and felt it was disrespectful towards her. Breakspeare has remained a controversial figure over the years, she has received a lot of vitriol and hate for being brazen about her affair with the married singer.

Awards and achievements
Preceded by (Puerto Rico) Wilnelia Merced	Miss World; 1976	Succeeded by (Sweden) Mary Stävin
