= United Hotels Company of America =

Defunct hotel chain

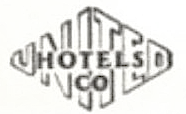
- Company type: Public
- Industry: Hotels
- Founded: 1910
- Defunct: 1945
- Headquarters: Niagara Falls, New York, U.S.
- Number of locations: 60+ (at peak)
- Area served: United States, Canada, Caribbean
- Key people: Frank A. Dudley; J. Leslie Kincaid

United Hotels Company of America, also known as United Hotels Company, was a chain of upscale hotels in the United States. The company was headquartered in Niagara Falls, New York, with administrative offices in New York City. The company was founded in 1910 by Frank A. Dudley and by the 1930s, the company was "the largest hotel group in the world under one control."

== History ==
The "United Hotels Company" was founded in 1910 and incorporated in the state of New York by Frank A. Dudley and F. W. Rockwell. On February 16, 1917, the company reorganized as "United Hotels Company of America" and was incorporated in the state of Delaware.

The company built and operated "first class fire proof hotels" in the more important cities of the United States and Canada. The strategy of the United Hotels Co. was to control 51% or more of the stock of all of its subsidiary operating companies (with certain exceptions, such as "The Onondaga Co.", where 90% of the stock was controlled by the officers of the United Hotels Co.). All of the companies operated the hotels under leases (except King Edward Hotel Co. Ltd., Clifton Co. Ltd., and Mount Royal Hotel Co. Ltd.). The United Hotels Co. owned substantial interests in the company stocks of the real estate companies whose hotels are leased to the operating companies.

Under the direction of hotelier and president Frank A. Dudley, the company eventually grew to become one of North Americas premier hotel companies, operating some of the finest hotels across the United States and Canada. By 1922, the company was operating eighteen hotels, and twenty-five by 1928. In 1924, Gen. J. Leslie Kincaid became president of the company.

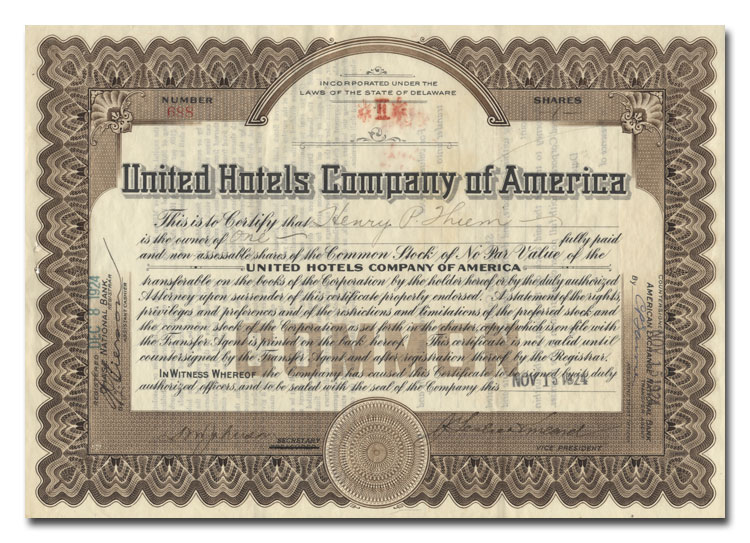
"United Hotels Company of America" Stock Certificate

By the 1930s, and with the onset of the Great Depression, the company was forced into receivership in November 1933, but it managed to reorganize in May 1934. The earnings of the individual hotels had shrunk by such a percent in the preceding four years that 80% of mortgages were in default, and in some cases, taxes and interest on first mortgages were unpaid. Continuing under Dudley, the newly organized "United Hotels Co. of America" was once again incorporated in New York with headquarters in the United Office Building in Niagara Falls. At that time, the company was also affiliated with the "American Hotels Corporation" chain, making it "the largest hotel group in the world under one control."

When Dudley, who was president of "United Hotels Company of America", vice-president of "American Hotels Corporation", and president or vice-president of 24 subsidiary hotel companies, died on September 21, 1945, at the age of 81, the hotel chain was managing 60 hotels. After his death, many of the company's hotels were acquired by other hotel chains, such as the Hilton Hotel.

== Company timeline ==
- 1910 - The "United Hotels Company" was founded and in incorporated in the state of New York.
- 1917 - The "United Hotels Company" was reorganized as the "United Hotels Company of America" in the state of Delaware
- 1922 - Operating 18 hotels
- 1928 - Operating 25 hotels
- 1933 - The company was forced into receivership in November
- 1934 - The company was reorganized as the "United Hotels Co. of America", once again incorporated in New York with headquarters in Niagara Falls, N.Y.
- 1945 - Operating 60 hotels. Frank A. Dudley died on September 21, at the age of 81. After Dudley's death, many of the company's hotels were acquired by other hotel chains, including Hilton Hotels.

== Gallery of former properties ==
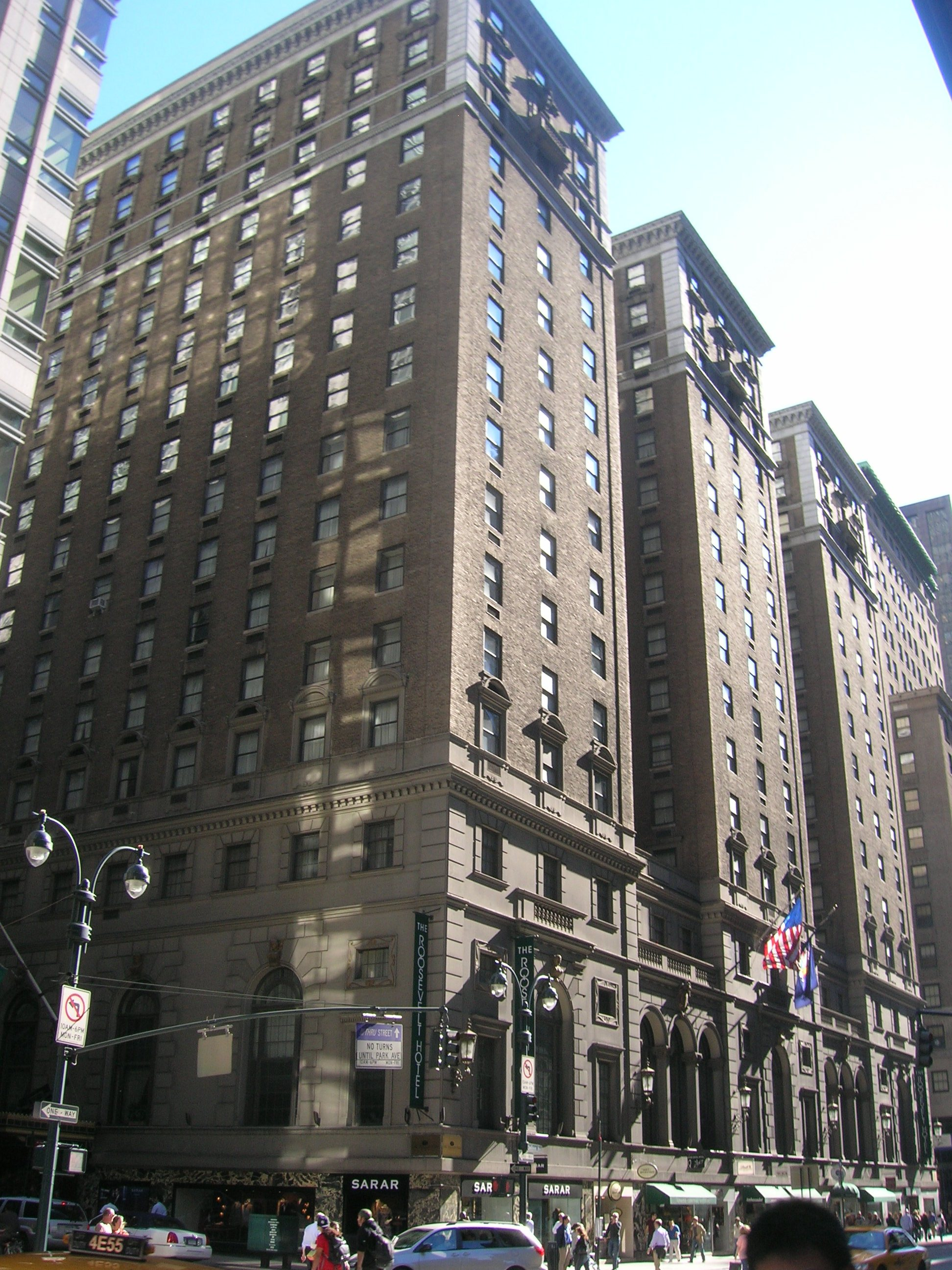
The Roosevelt in New York City

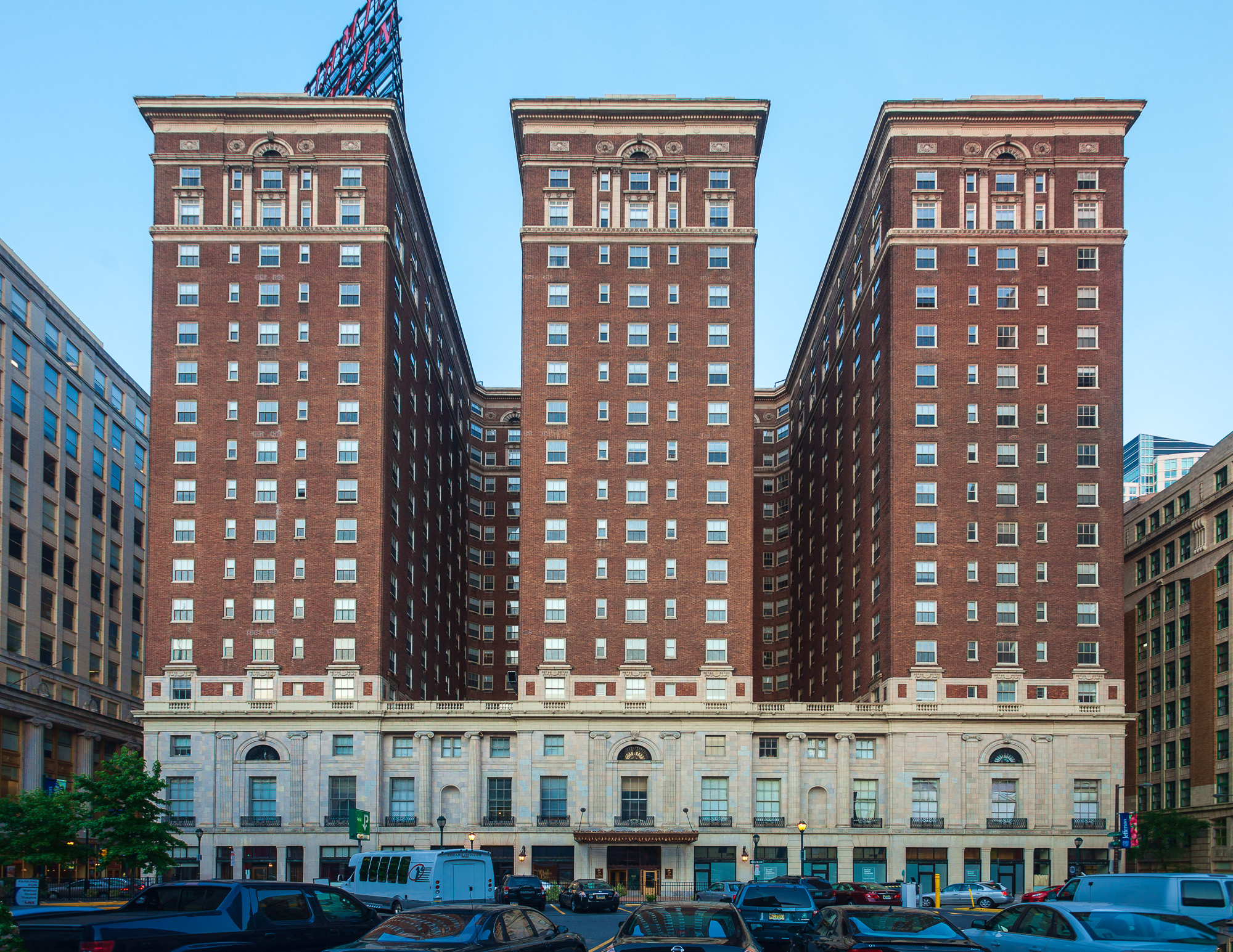
The Benjamin Franklin in Philadelphia

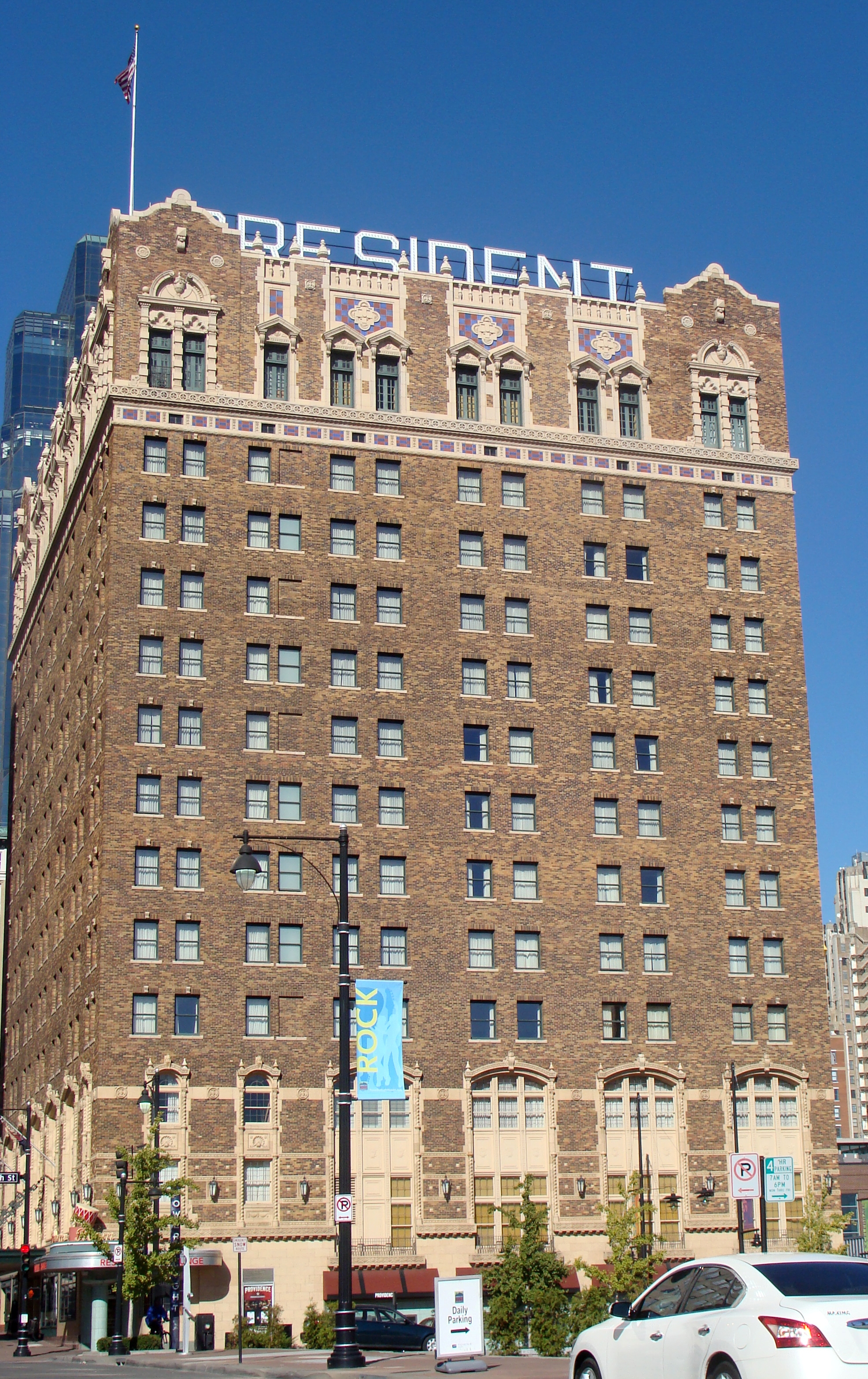
President in Kansas City, Missouri

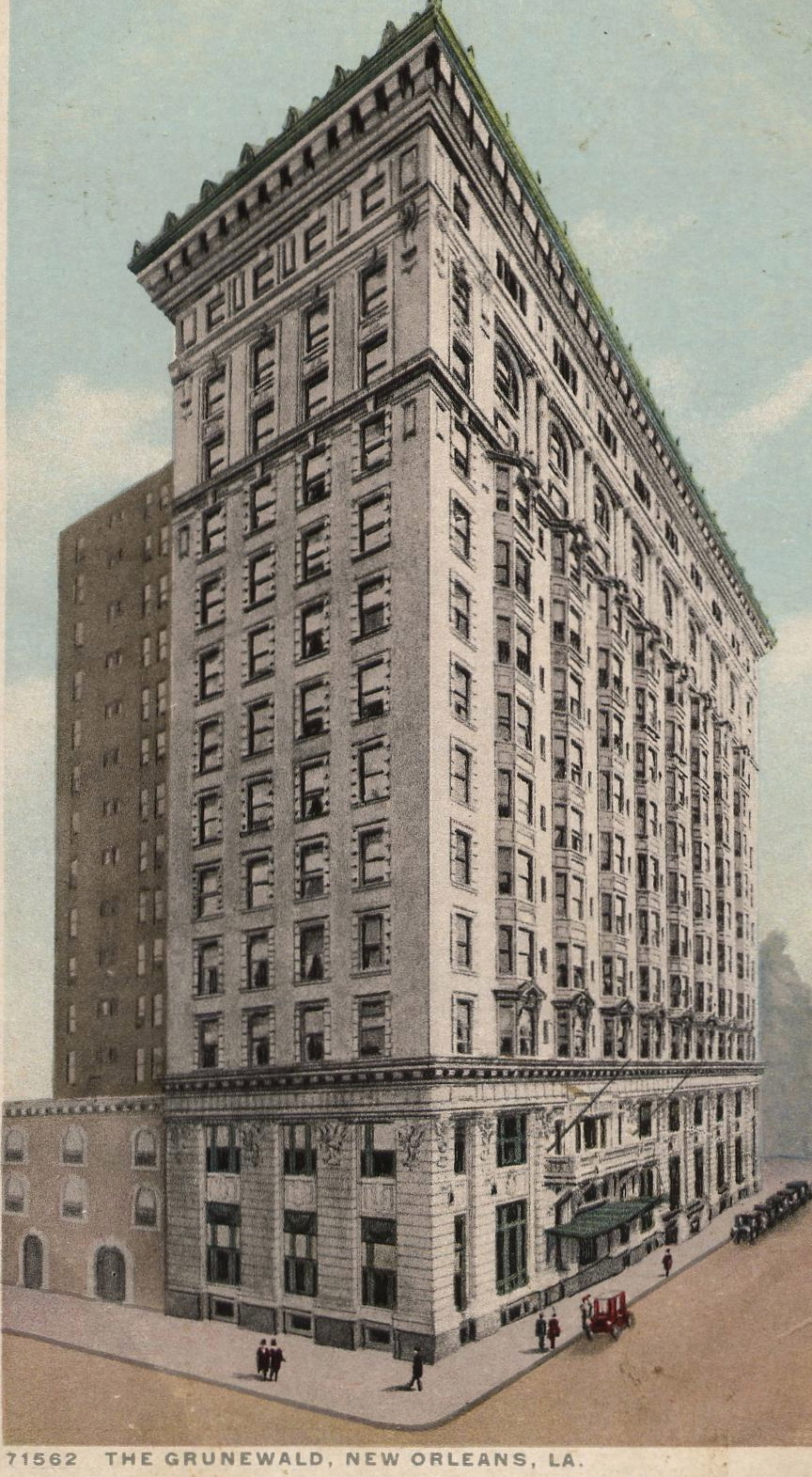
The Roosevelt in New Orleans

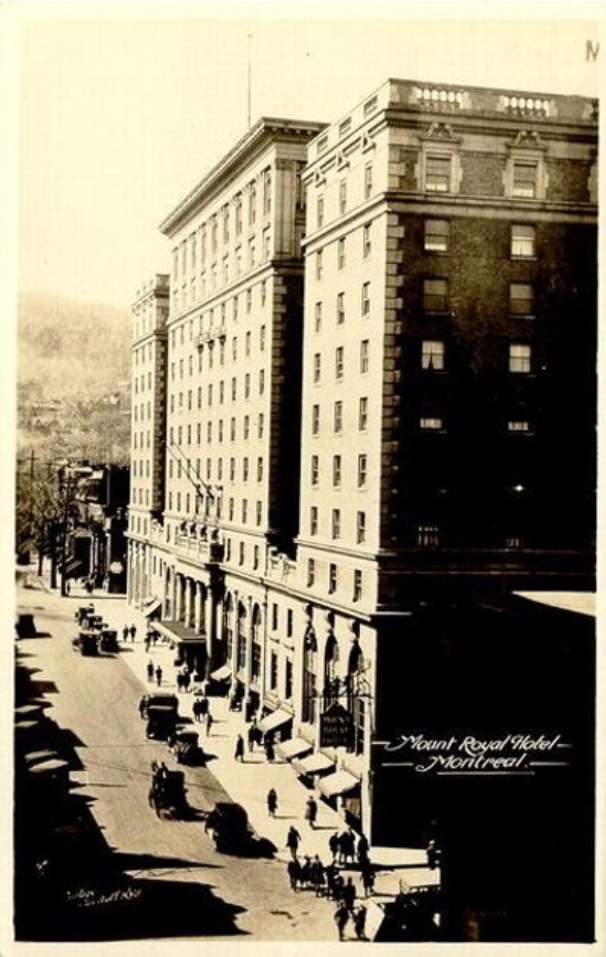
The Mount Royal in Montreal

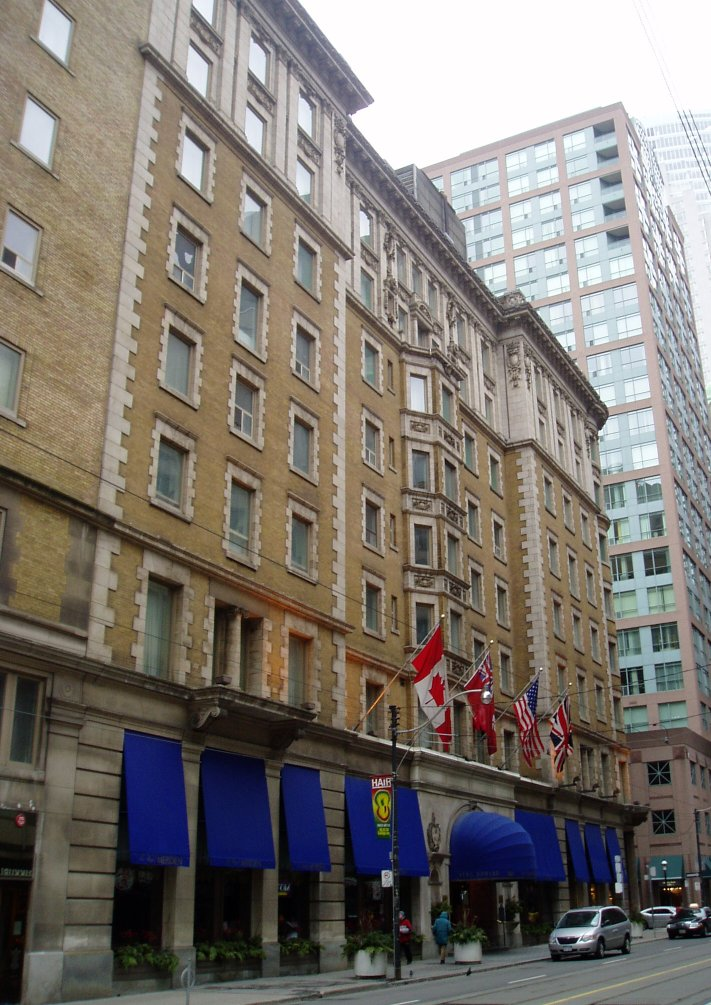
King Edward Hotel, in Toronto

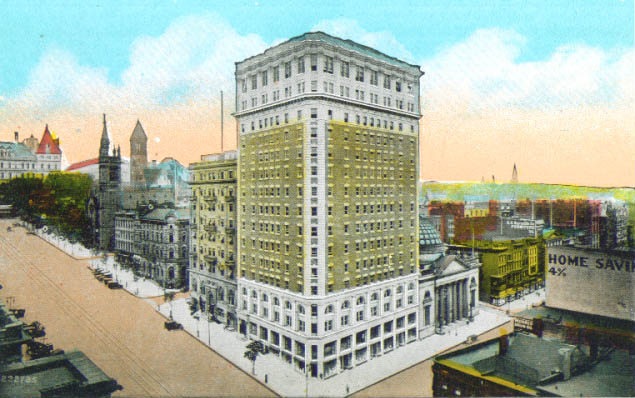
The Ten Eyck in Albany, New York

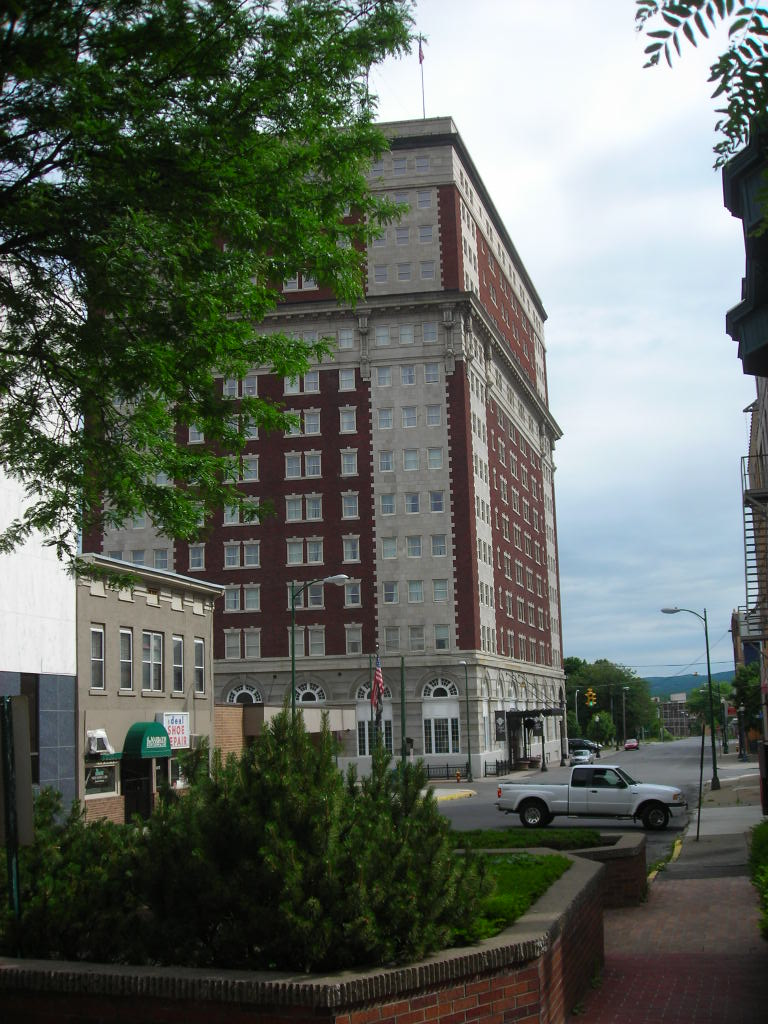
Hotel Utica in Utica, New York

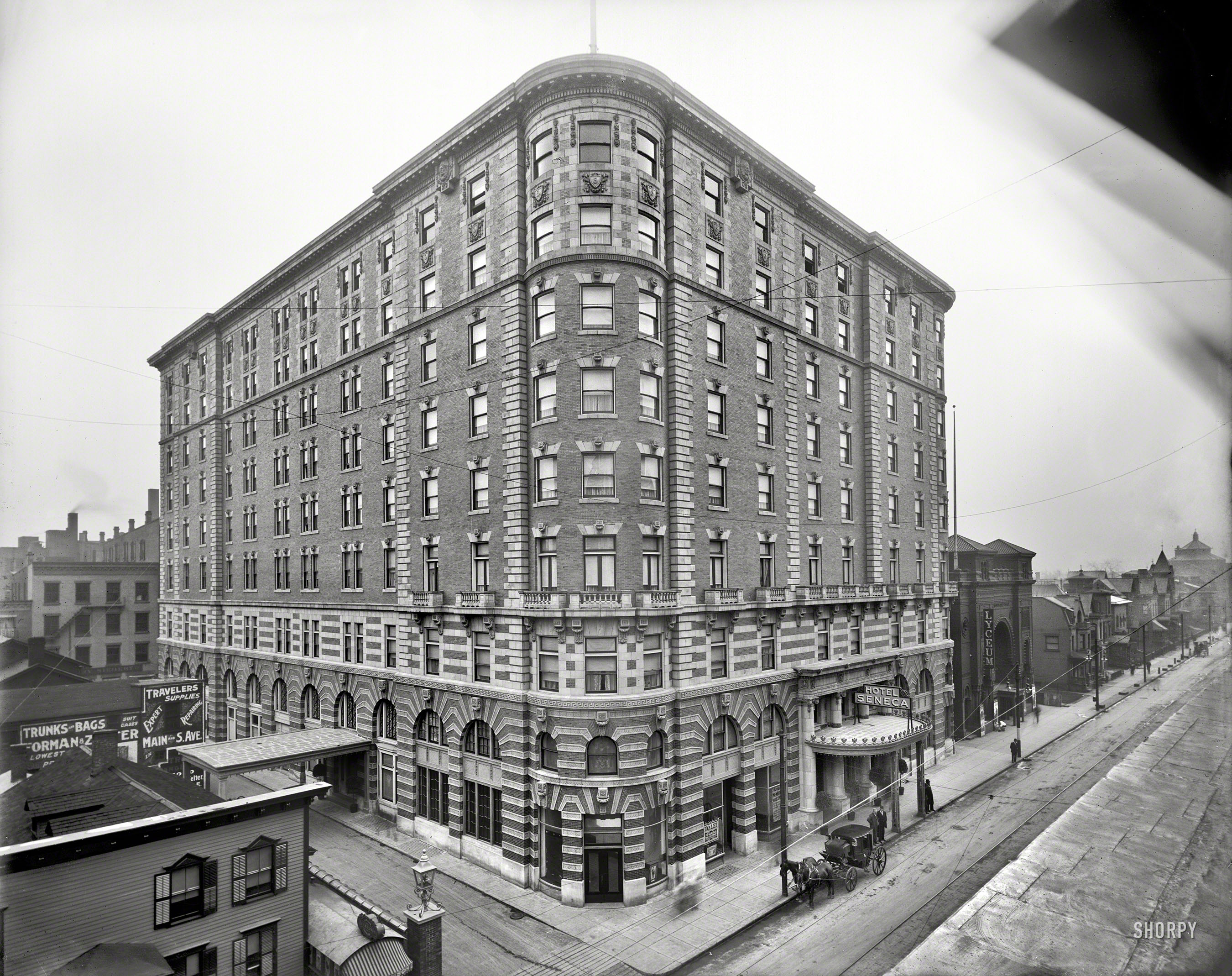
Seneca Hotel in Rochester, New York

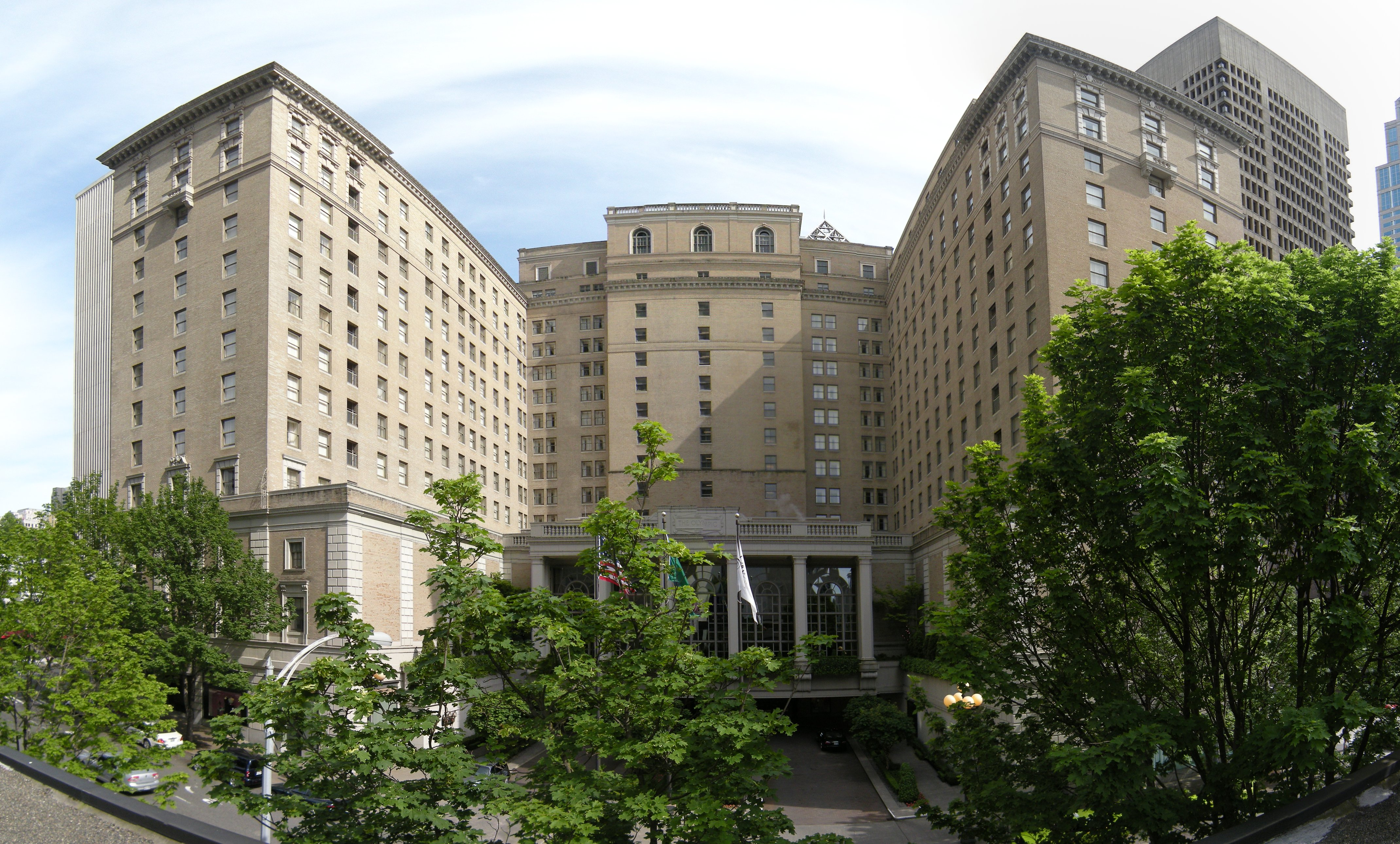
Olympic Hotel in Seattle

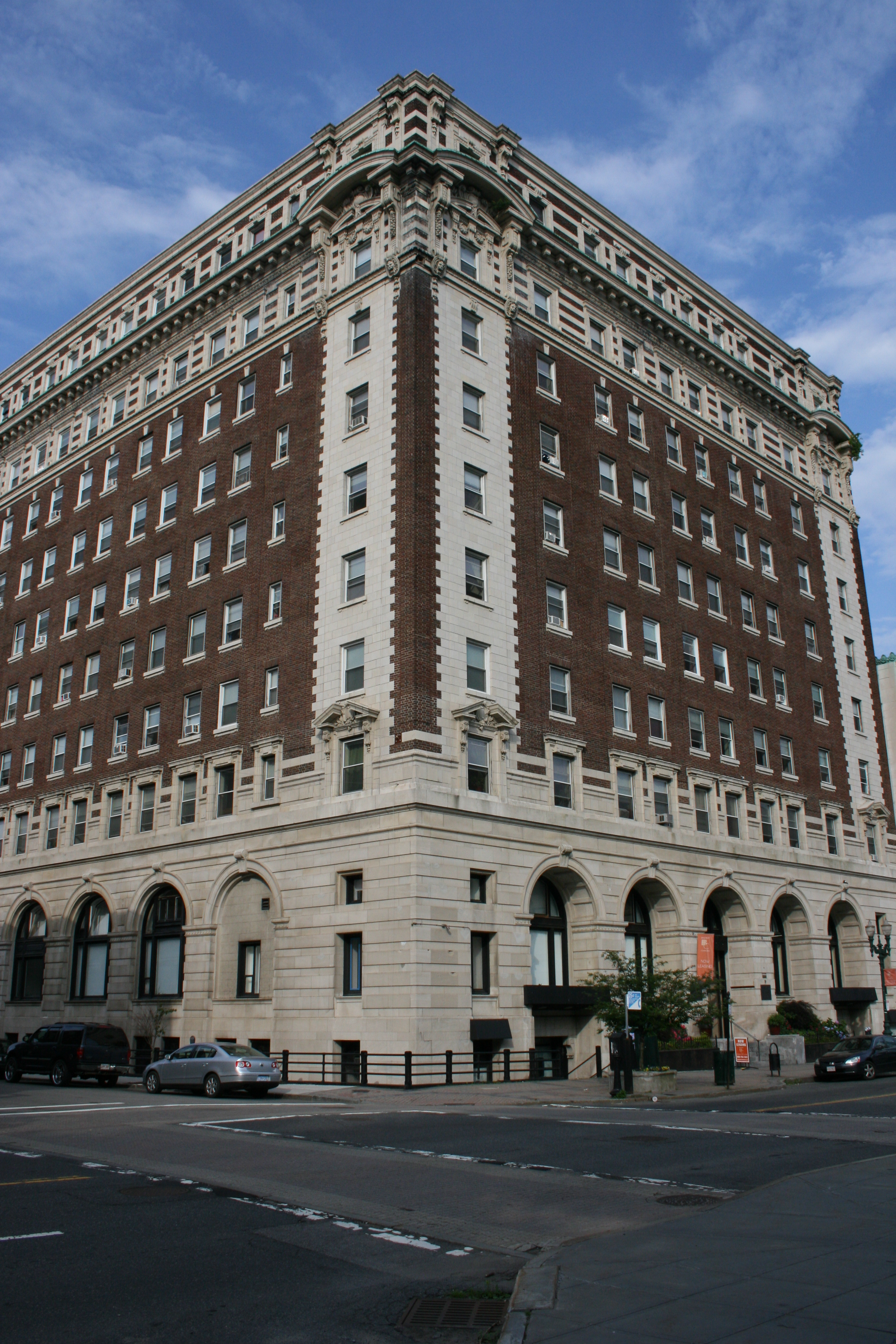
Bancroft Hotel in Worcester, Massachusetts

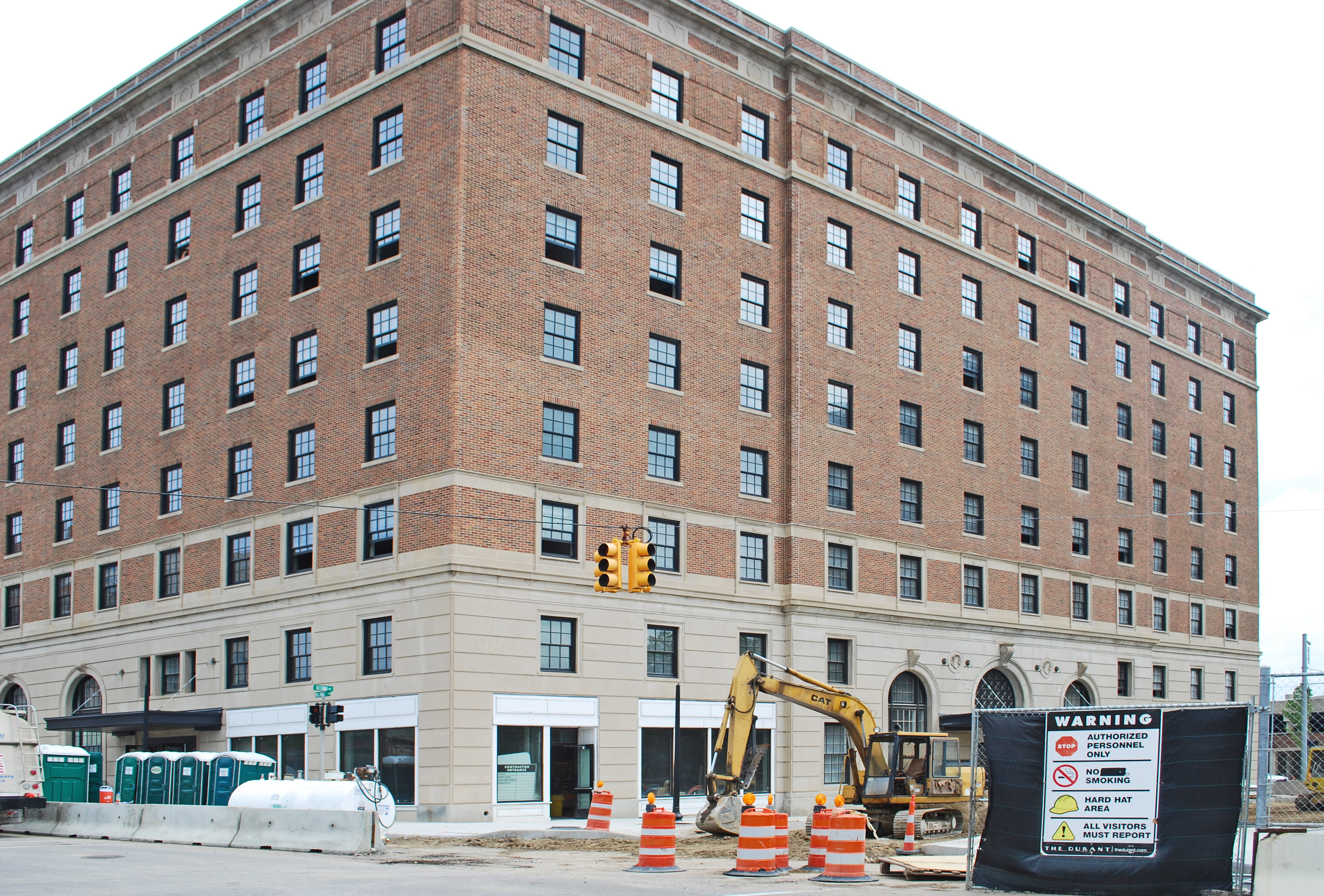
Hotel Durant in Flint, Michigan

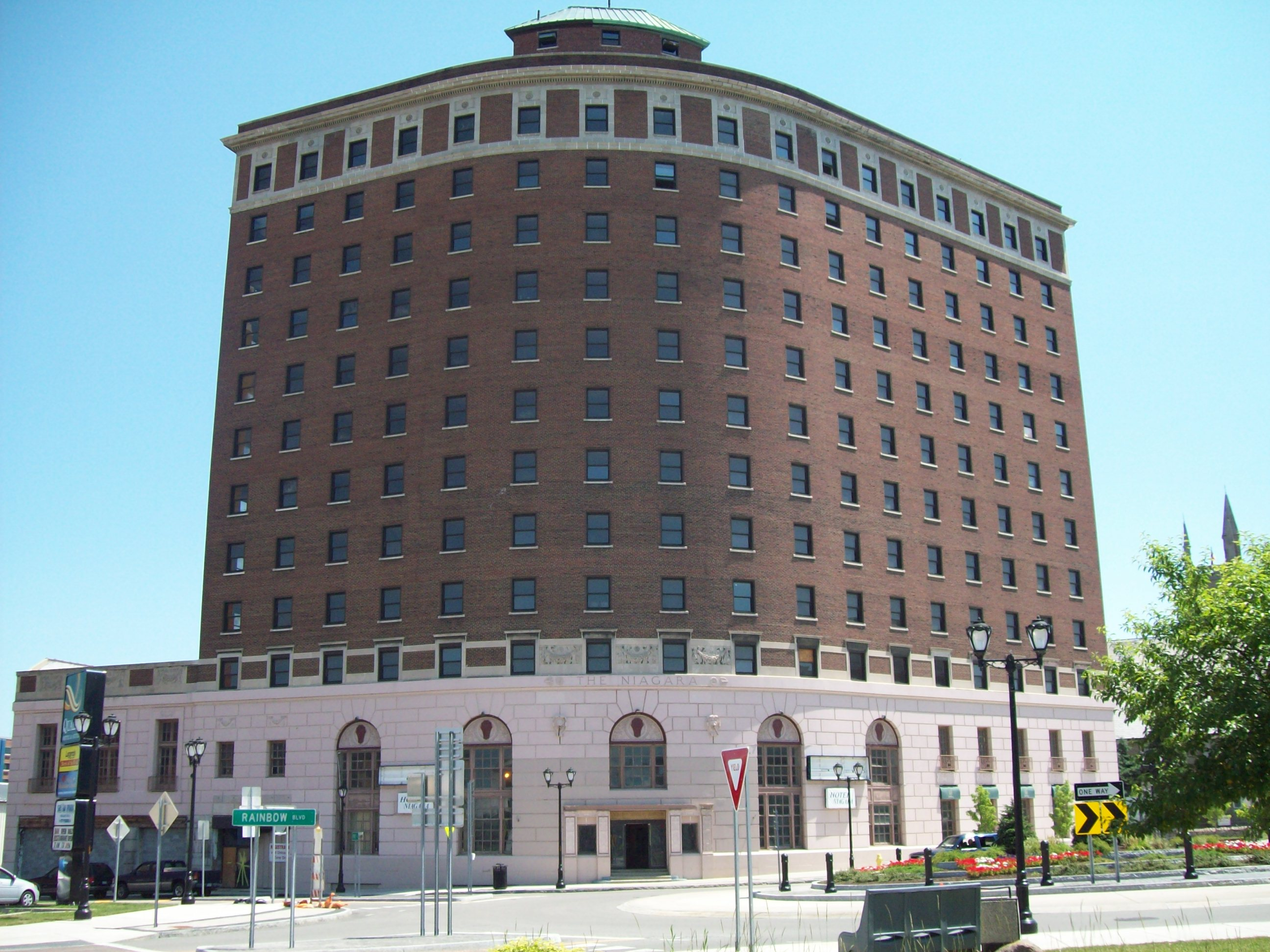
Hotel Niagara in Niagara Falls, New York

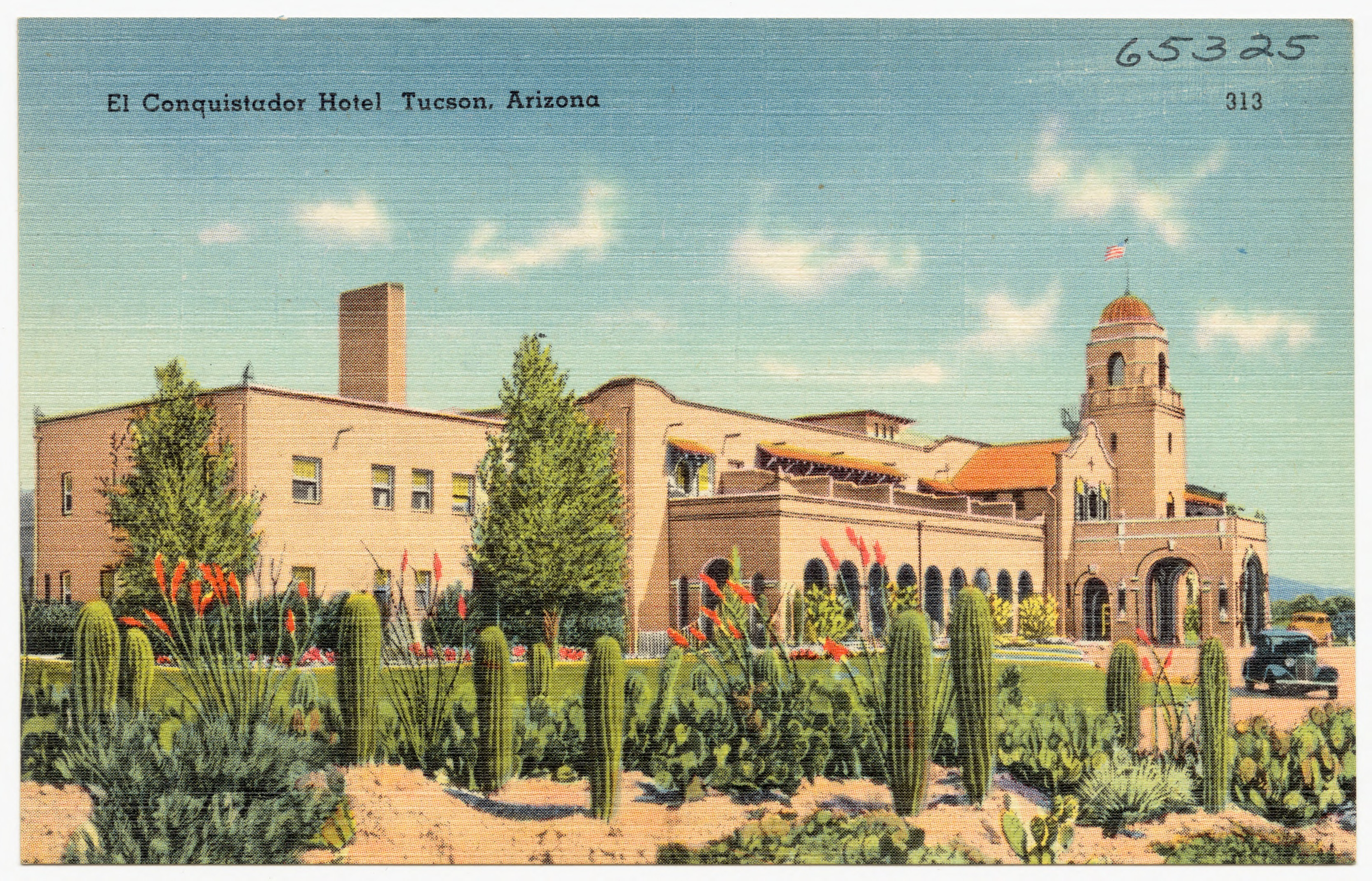
El Conquistador Hotel in Tucson, Arizona

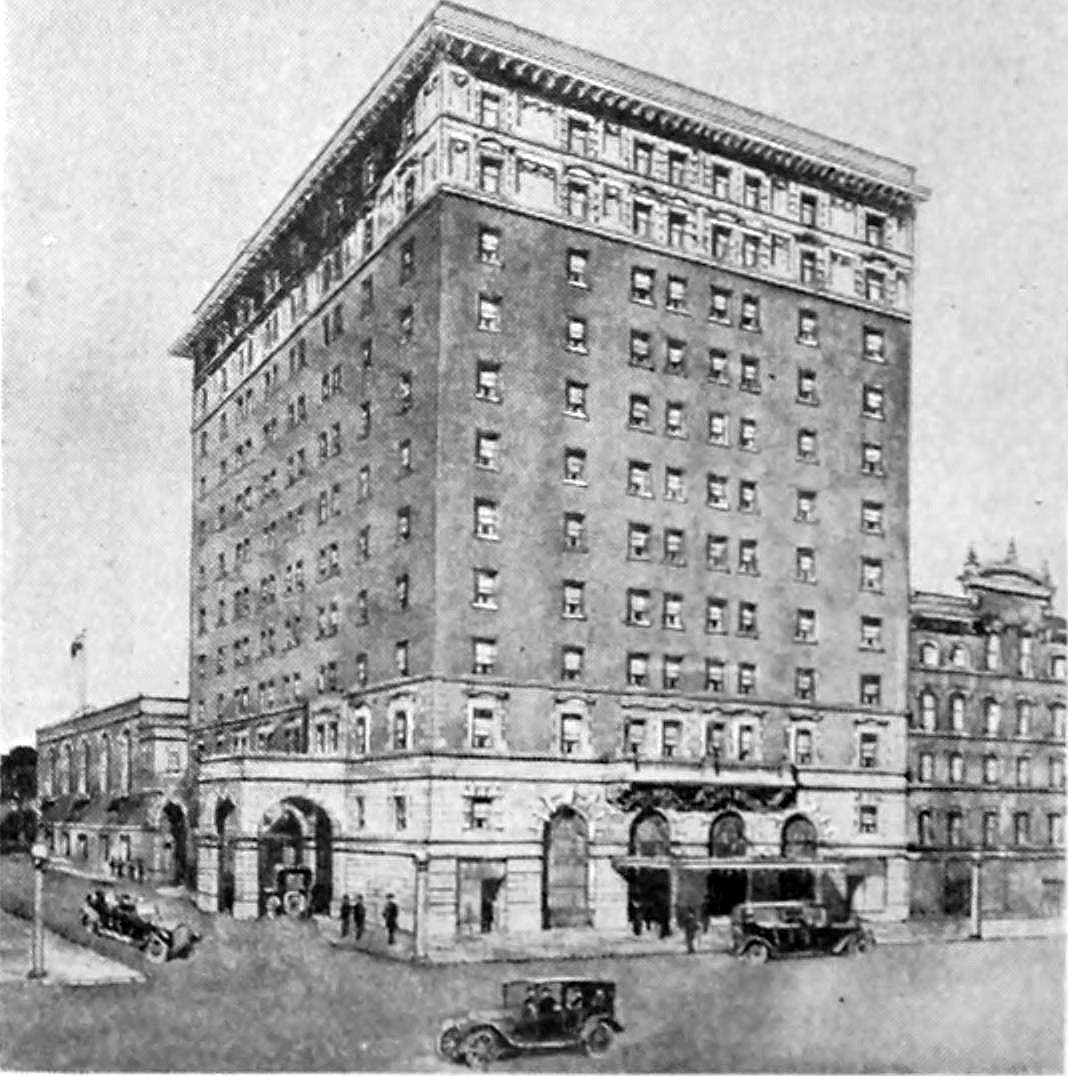
Royal Connaught Hotel in Hamilton, Ontario

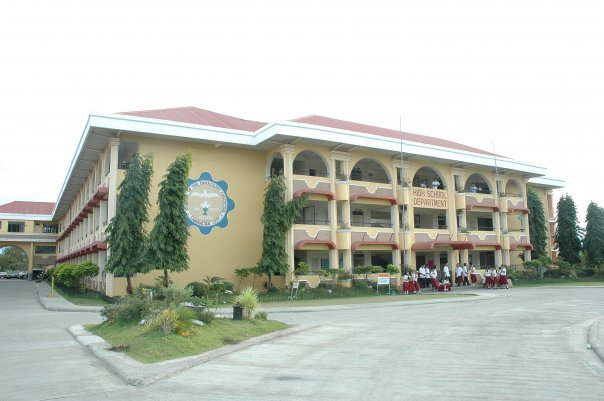
Constant Spring Hotel in Jamaica

== Properties ==
=== Domestic ===
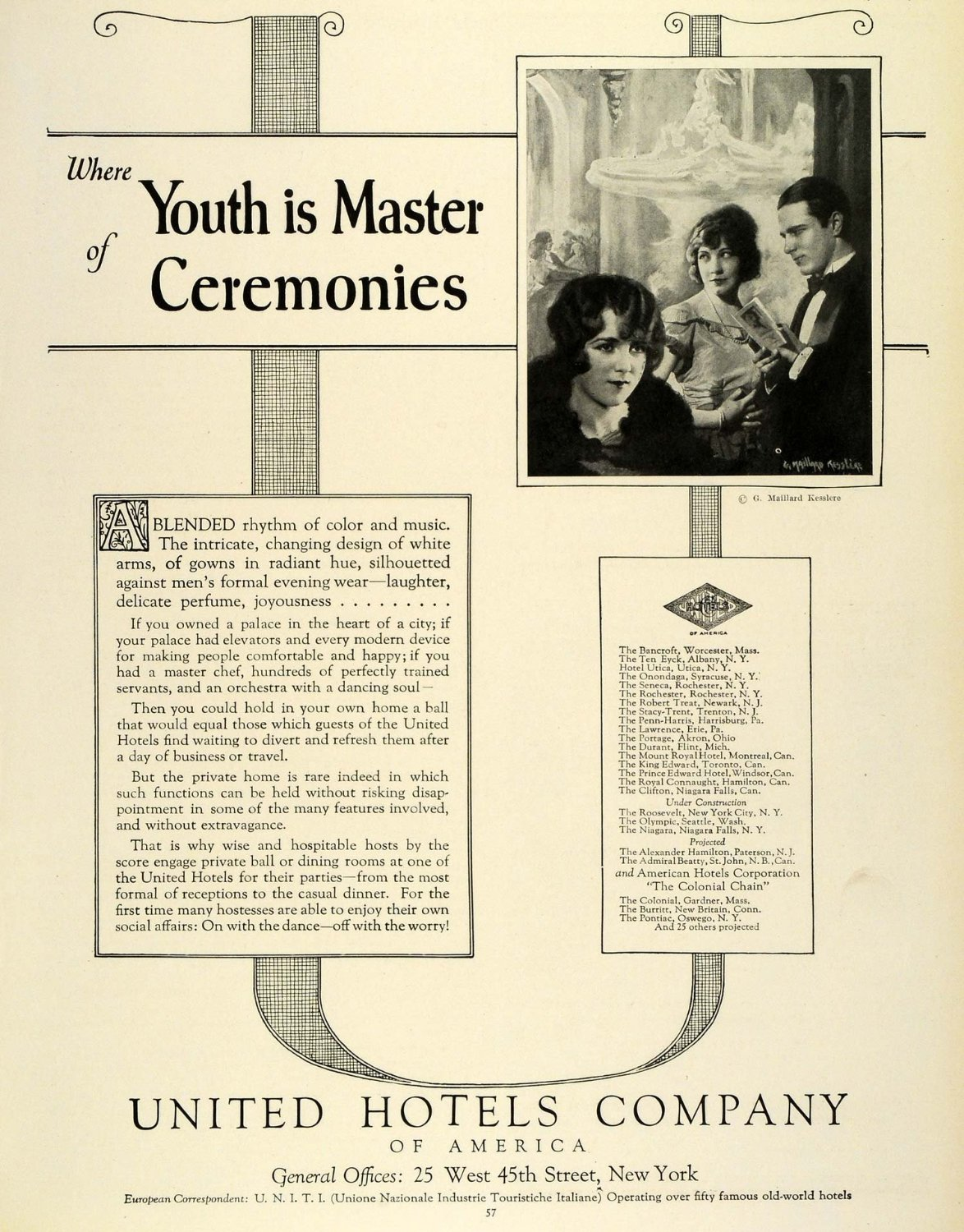
United Hotels Company Ad

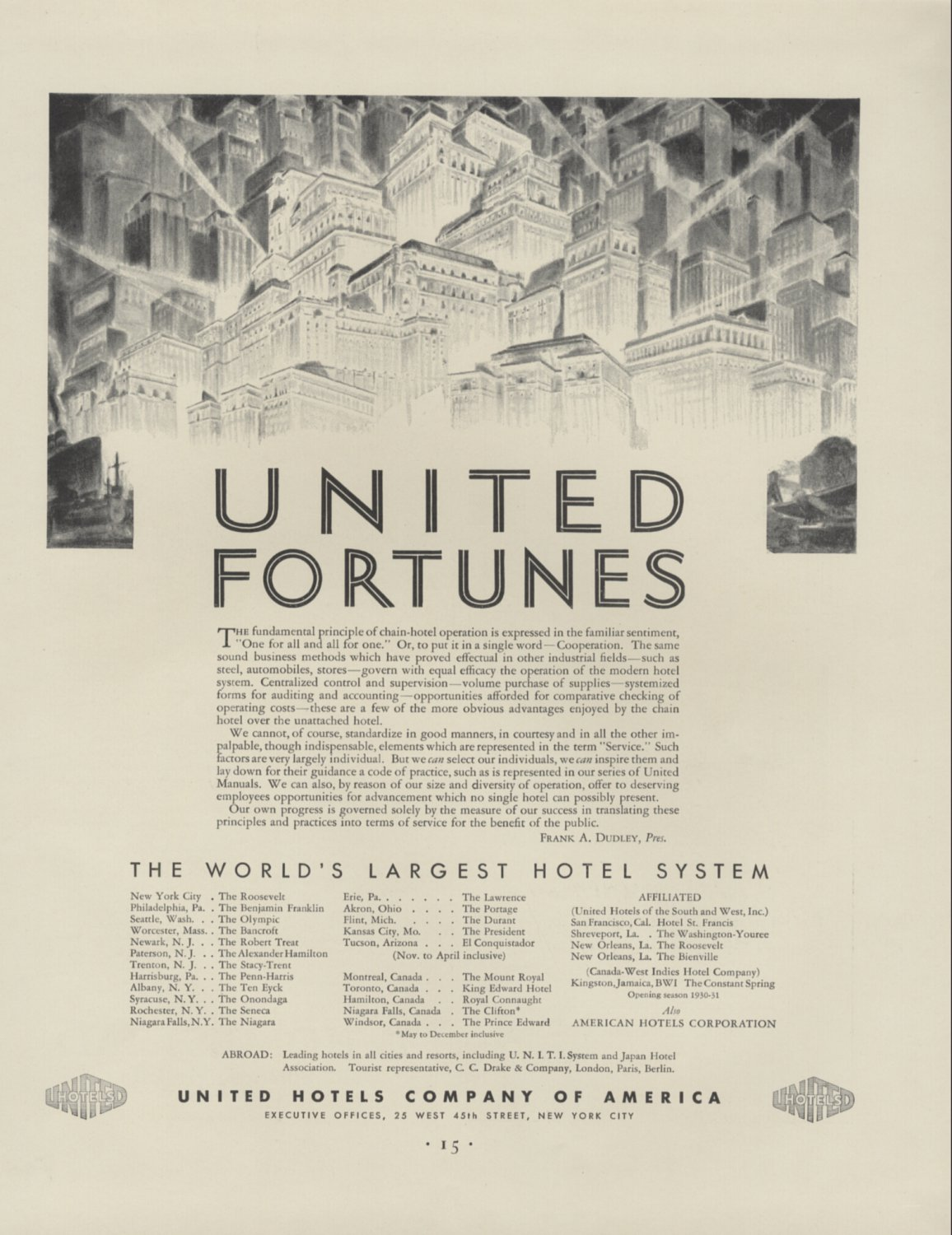
United Hotels Company of America Ad

While in operation, the company operated several upscale and famous hotels in the United States, including:

- The Roosevelt in New York City
- The Ten Eyck in Albany, N.Y. (demolished 1971)
- The Utica in Utica, N.Y.
- The Onondaga in Syracuse, N.Y. (demolished 1970)
- The Seneca in Rochester, N.Y. (demolished 1969)
- The Rochester in Rochester, N.Y. (demolished 1999)
- The Benjamin Franklin in Philadelphia
- The Lawrence in Erie, Pa. (demolished 1968)
- The Penn-Harris in Harrisburg, Pa. (demolished 1973)
- The Olympic in Seattle, Wash.
- The Bancroft in Worcester, Mass.
- The Portage in Akron, Ohio (demolished 1991)
- Fort Steuben Hotel Steubenville, Ohio
- The Durant in Flint, Mich.
- The Robert Treat in Newark, N.J.
- The Alexander Hamilton in Paterson, N.J.
- The Stacy-Trent in Trenton, New Jersey (demolished 1967)
- The Tutwiler, in Birmingham, Alabama (demolished 1974) (Note: The modern Tutwiler Hotel is an entirely unconnected business, which opened in 1986 in a converted apartment building, formerly The Ridgely.)
- The Roosevelt in New Orleans
- The Bienville in New Orleans
- The Washington-Youree Hotel in Shreveport, Louisiana (demolished 1979)
- Hotel Niagara in Niagara Falls, N.Y.
- President in Kansas City, Missouri
- El Conquistador Hotel in Tucson, Arizona (demolished 1968)

=== International ===
In Canada, the company operated:

- The Mount Royal in Montreal
- The Royal Connaught in Hamilton, Ontario
- The Clifton in Niagara Falls, Ontario (burned 1932)
- King Edward Hotel, in Toronto
- The Prince Edward in Windsor, Ontario (demolished 1976)
- The Admiral Beatty in Saint John, New Brunswick

Outside the United States and Canada, the company operated:

- Constant Spring Hotel in Kingston, Jamaica

=== International affiliates ===
The "United Hotels Company" was affiliated international with Important Hotels of U.N.I.T.I. "Unione Nazionale Industrie Turistiche Italiane" in Italy; the "Japan Hotel Association", Tokyo, Japan; "United Travel and Hotel Bureau", headquarters in Paris.

== See also ==
- Frank A. Dudley
- List of defunct hotel chains
