= The Durant =

- Hotel Durant
- U.S. National Register of Historic Places
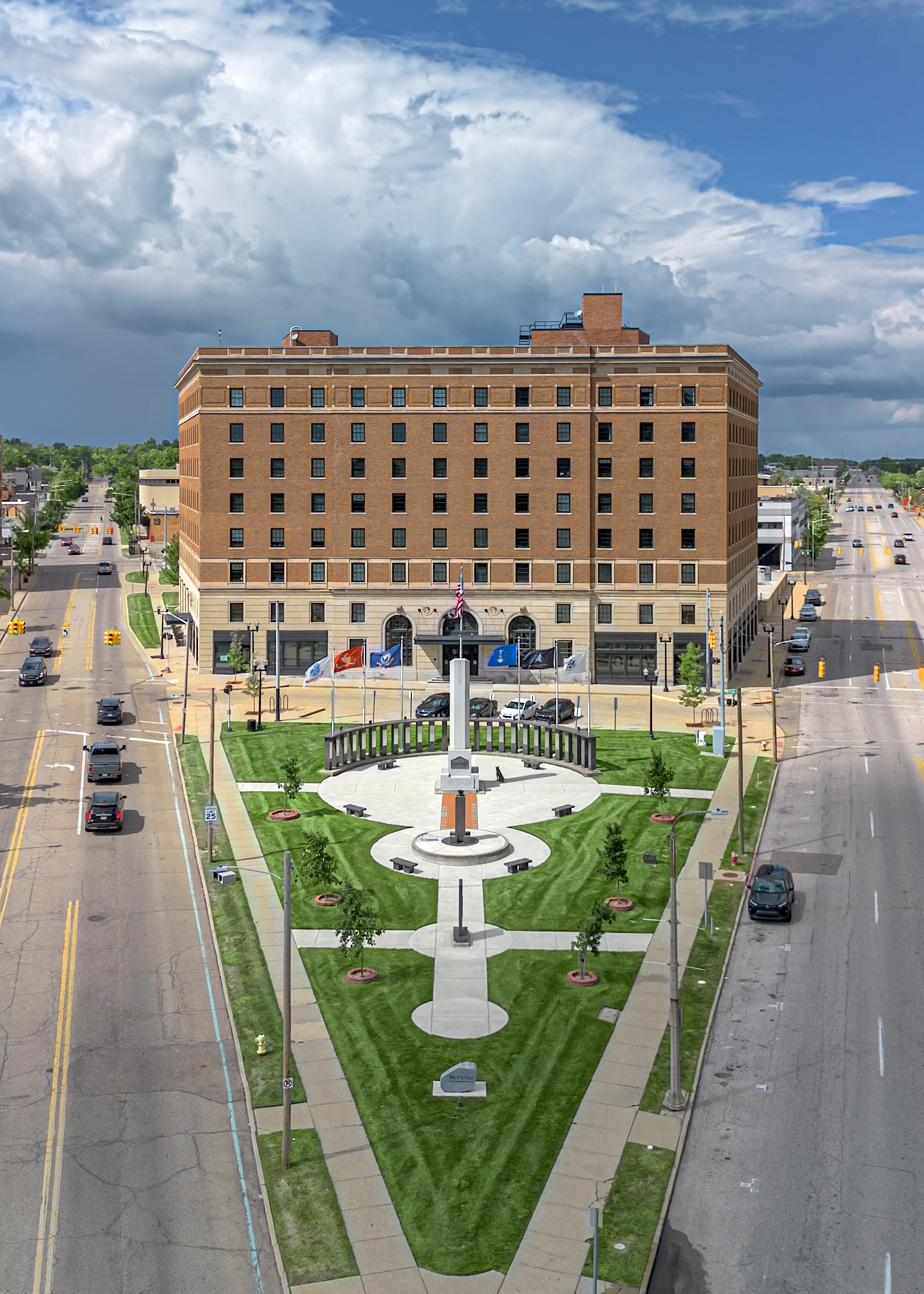
- Interactive map
- Location: 607 E. 2nd Ave. Flint, Michigan
- Coordinates: 43°01′13″N 83°41′39″W
- Area: 1.7 acres (0.69 ha)
- Built: 1919
- Architect: Esenwein & Johnson
- Architectural style: Colonial Revival
- NRHP reference No.: 09000128
- Added to NRHP: March 17, 2009

The Durant is an apartment building located at 607 East 2nd Avenue in Flint, Michigan, United States. It was built as the Hotel Durant in 1919, and was listed on the National Register of Historic Places in 2009.

== History ==
In the early 20th century, the automotive industry in Flint rapidly expanded, raising Flint's population from 13,000 in 1900 to more than 90,000 in 1920. Buick and Chevrolet led the rise of the automakers in Flint. When both were folded into the new General Motors (GM) in 1908, the company dominated Flint's economy. The rise of GM quickly created an urgent need for more and better hotel accommodations in Flint. By the late 1910s, the Durant Hotel Company, headed by GM chairman William C. Durant, had raised $500,000 to construct a new hotel. The company contracted with the United Hotels Company of America to supervise the construction and furnishing of the hotel, and to manage it after opening. In 1918, United retained the architectural firm of Esenwein & Johnson of Buffalo, New York, to design the hotel, and construction began in 1919.

The hotel was originally planned as a six-story structure, but two additional stories were added during construction to respond to increased demand. The hotel opened with 264 guest rooms on December 14, 1920. The Durant was immediately Flint's leading hotel, by far the largest and the most distinguished in the area. In addition to hosting guests from out of town, it was used by local groups and individuals for meetings and celebrations.

In 1942, the hotel was purchased by the Albert Pick Hotels Company. By the late 1960s, GM's operations in Flint were declining, and there was less need for a large hotel. The 1973 oil crisis provided the final shock, and the Hotel Durant closed its doors in 1973. The hotel remained vacant, with various redevelopment plans falling through. In 2005, it was purchased by the Genesee County Land Bank. In 2008, it was taken over by an LLC, and renovations began to turn the former hotel into an apartment complex. The new apartments opened in 2010, and reached full capacity the next year.

== Description ==
The Durant is a large eight-story Neo-Georgian building with a splayed U configuration fitting into a trapezoidal lot. It has three primary exterior facades, each having a two-story base finished in limestone, with the upper six stories finished in red brick with limestone detailing, including bands at the fourth and eighth floors. Two main entrances leading to the lobby are located to the south (the base of the U) and west facades. The primary entrance on the south is flanked by two large arched windows; a set of four similar windows are on the west side. Commercial storefronts ring the remainder of the base. The upper floors contain identical, six-over-six, double-hung windows with limestone sills. The building is topped with a brick and limestone cornice/parapet.
