= Miss World 1976 =

26th Miss World pageant

- Cindy Breakspeare
- Date: 18 November 1976
- Presenters: Ray Moore; Patrick Lichfield; Sacha Distel
- Venue: Royal Albert Hall, London, United Kingdom
- Broadcaster: BBC
- Entrants: 60
- Placements: 15
- Debuts: Guatemala; United States Virgin Islands
- Withdrawals: Barbados; Bolivia; Cuba; Guernsey; Haiti; India; Malaysia; Mauritius; Nicaragua; Philippines; Saint Lucia; Seychelles; Sri Lanka; Swaziland; Tunisia; Yugoslavia
- Returns: Chile; Cyprus; Ecuador; French Polynesia; Jamaica; Paraguay; Spain
- Winner: Cindy Breakspeare; Jamaica
- Personality: Veronica Matsepe; South Africa (Note: Black representative from South Africa competed as Miss Africa South in the pageant)
- Photogenic: Jakki Moore; Ireland

Miss World 1976 was the 26th edition of the Miss World pageant, held at the Royal Albert Hall in London, United Kingdom on 18 November 1976.

At the end of the competition, Wilnelia Merced of Puerto Rico crowned Cindy Breakspeare of Jamaica as Miss World 1976. It was Jamaica's second victory in the history of the pageant. Karen Jo Pini of Australia finished as first runner-up, while Diana Marie Duenas of Guam finished as second runner-up.

Contestants from sixty countries and territories participated in this pageant. Ray Moore, Patrick Lichfield, and Sacha Distel hosted the competition. This edition also featured for the first time the new Miss World crown made by English jeweler Russel Stone, which featured 1,259 diamonds.

== Background ==
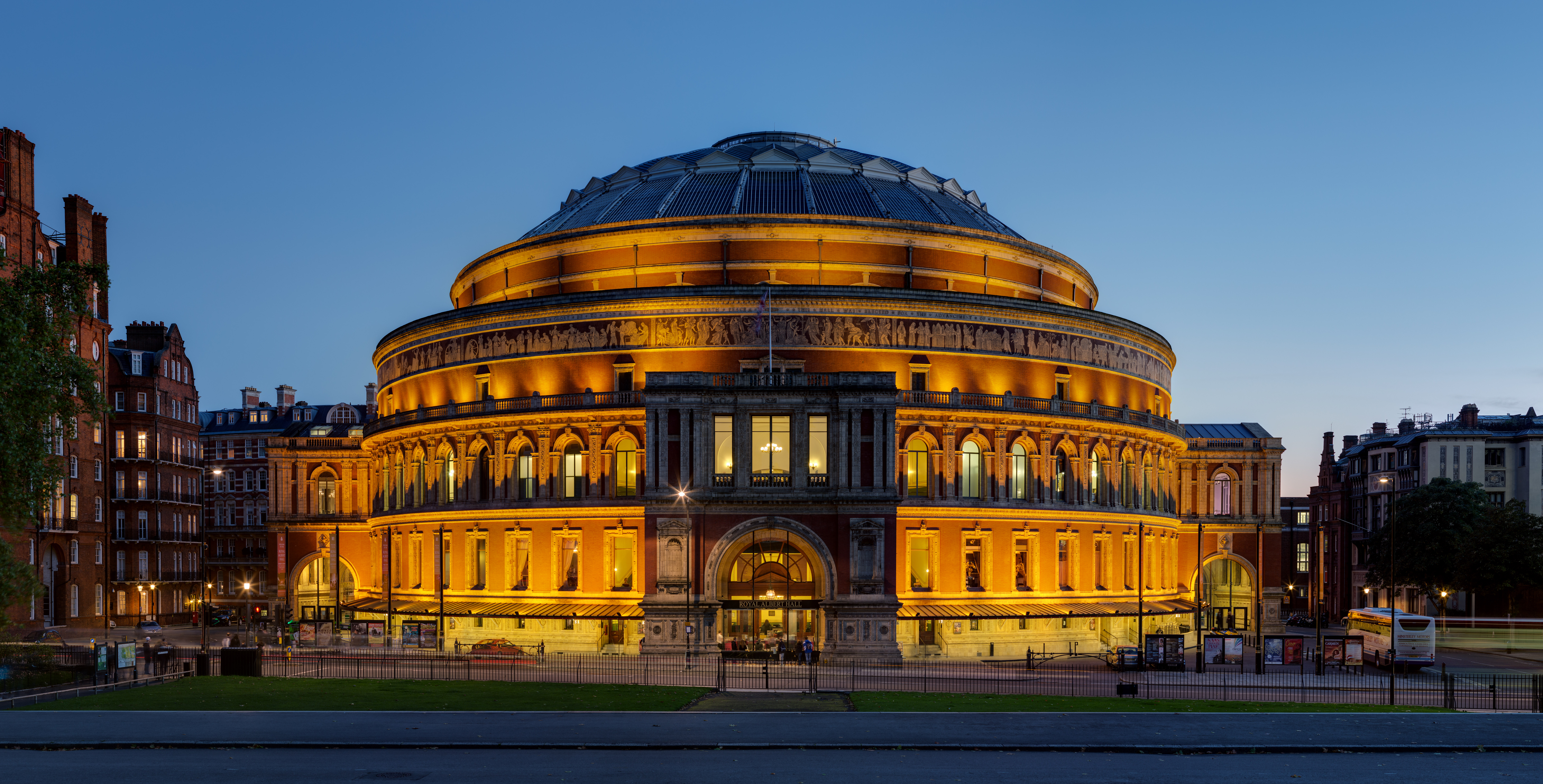
Royal Albert Hall, the location of Miss World 1976

=== Selection of participants ===
Participants from sixty countries and territories were chosen to compete in the pageant. Nine contestants were appointed to represent their countries/territories after placing as runners-up in their national pageants, or were selected through a casting process, and three contestants were appointed after the original delegates withdrew.

A new rule was implemented by Miss World in this edition. Beginning with this edition, a contestant would only be accepted if the national competition in which the said contestant won took place in the country she represents. This rule was implemented so that what happened to Maricela Maxie Clark, who represented Cuba even though she was born in Miami, Florida in the United States, would not happen again.

==== Replacements ====
Miss Honduras 1976 first runner-up Carmen Leticia Figueroa was originally scheduled to compete in this edition, but she was not allowed by the organizers of Miss Honduras to participate in Miss World because she was married. Because the runners-up wanted to replace Figueroa, Maribel Ayala, one of the semi-finalists of Miss Honduras 1976, was appointed instead to represent Honduras at Miss World. Miss Mexico 1976 first runner-up Emilia Estefanía Smith was originally scheduled to compete, but she was replaced by Miss Mexico 1976 Carla Jean Evert due to undisclosed reasons. Although the new Miss Italy, Paola Bresciano, claimed her right to participate in Miss World, she was ignored by the said organization because Italy's official candidate in this edition was Antonella Lombrosi.

==== Debuts, returns, and withdrawals ====
Guatemala and the U.S. Virgin Islands competed for the first time. Returning to this edition were Tahiti, which last competed in 1965; Chile, which last competed in 1969; Paraguay, which last competed in 1972; Cyprus, which last competed in 1973; and Ecuador, Spain, and Jamaica, which all last competed in 1974.

Barbados, Bolivia, Cuba, Guernsey, Haiti, India, Malaysia, Mauritius, Nicaragua, Philippines, Saint Lucia, Seychelles, Sri Lanka, Swaziland, Tunisia, and Yugoslavia did not compete in this edition. Jewell Nightingale of Barbados did not compete due to a lack of funds to send her to London and instead competed in Miss Universe. Irene Matthews of Guernsey and Ivania Navarro of Nicaragua did not compete due to undisclosed reasons. Cynthia Elibox of Saint Lucia also did not compete due to a budget shortage. Bolivia, Haiti, and Cuba did not compete in this edition after their national organizations failed to hold a national competition or appoint a delegate. Meanwhile, Naina Balsavar of India, Lorraine Wede Johnson of Liberia, Che Puteh Che Naziauddin of Malaysia, Anne-Lise Lesur of Mauritius, Josephine Conde of the Philippines, Lynn Gobine of Seychelles, Tamara Ingrid Subramanian of Sri Lanka, Zanella Tutu Tshabalala of Swaziland, and Slavica Stefanović of Yugoslavia withdrew from the competition in protest against the participation of two candidates from South Africa, led by the South African Non-Racial Olympic Committee or SANROC. Although announced to compete in Miss World, Yuliarti Rahayuningsih of Indonesia did not compete due to undisclosed reasons.

Two contestants were not allowed to compete in this edition. First was Mandi Anathi Gulwa of Transkei, who was disqualified by Julia Morley because the United Kingdom did not recognize Transkei's independence even though its independence was declared on 26 October 1976. The second was Jane Bird of Rhodesia, who was not allowed by Morley to participate due to political reasons, and because the United Kingdom also did not recognize Rhodesia. Additionally, Bird arrived in London too late to participate in Miss World.

=== Controversies ===
==== Withdrawal of some contestants in protest of South Africa's participation ====
On 10 November 1976, SANROC asked the Miss World organizers to ban the participation of two candidates from South Africa, one black and one white, because it was racist and only one candidate should be sent by each participating country in Miss World. Julia Morley rejected the request and said that in the next edition, only one candidate from South Africa would participate and the competition in which the candidate would be chosen would be multiracial. However, Chris de Broglio, secretary of SANROC, still doubted that the South African government would allow Miss South Africa to have a multiracial competition. The refusal of SANROC's request prompted SANROC to send letters to forty-five country embassies in London urging them to boycott Miss World, much like what happened at the 1976 Summer Olympics in Montreal.

On 14 November, Anne-Lise Lesur of Mauritius and Zanella Tutu Tshabalala of Swaziland received letters from their governments to withdraw from the competition due to South Africa's delegation in this edition. The letters came from the embassies of Swaziland and Mauritius in London, which they had to follow. On 15 November, the Foreign Minister of Liberia instructed Lorraine Wede Johnson to also withdraw from the competition, and on 16 November, Naina Balsavar of India withdrew by order of her government. On 17 November, Lynn Gobine of Seychelles, Che Puteh Che Naziauddin of Malaysia, and Tamara Ingrid Subramanian of Sri Lanka also withdrew.

Although seven contestants had already withdrawn from the competition due to their governments' boycott of Miss World, Morley still decided to continue the competition. The remaining sixty-two contestants continued with their dress rehearsal and the recording of the parade of nations when Morley received two letters regarding the withdrawal of candidates from the Philippines and Yugoslavia, Josephine Conde and Slavica Stefanović. Morley received the letter from the Philippine Government a few minutes before the recording of the parade of nations began. When Conde was informed that the Philippine government ordered her to withdraw, the candidate wept and tried to appeal to the First Lady of the Philippines, Imelda Marcos, who was also in London at that time, but it failed. Although no longer part of the list of candidates, Conde decided to still participate in the parade of nations. Stefanović withdrew from the competition after the recording of the parade of nations. According to a BBC spokesperson, because the recorded parade of nations at the Royal Albert Hall had background music, Conde and Stefanović could not be removed from the video, and viewers would simply be told what happened during the final telecast.

On 18 November, on the day of the final telecast, one more candidate was instructed by her government to withdraw, and she was Patricia Anderson Leon of Trinidad and Tobago. Although the letter from their government was received, Anderson Leon ignored it and continued to participate. Anderson Leon was later named as one of the fifteen semi-finalists. Although Morley still feared that approximately twenty-five more candidates might withdraw at the last minute, the competition and the final telecast proceeded according to plan.

== Results ==
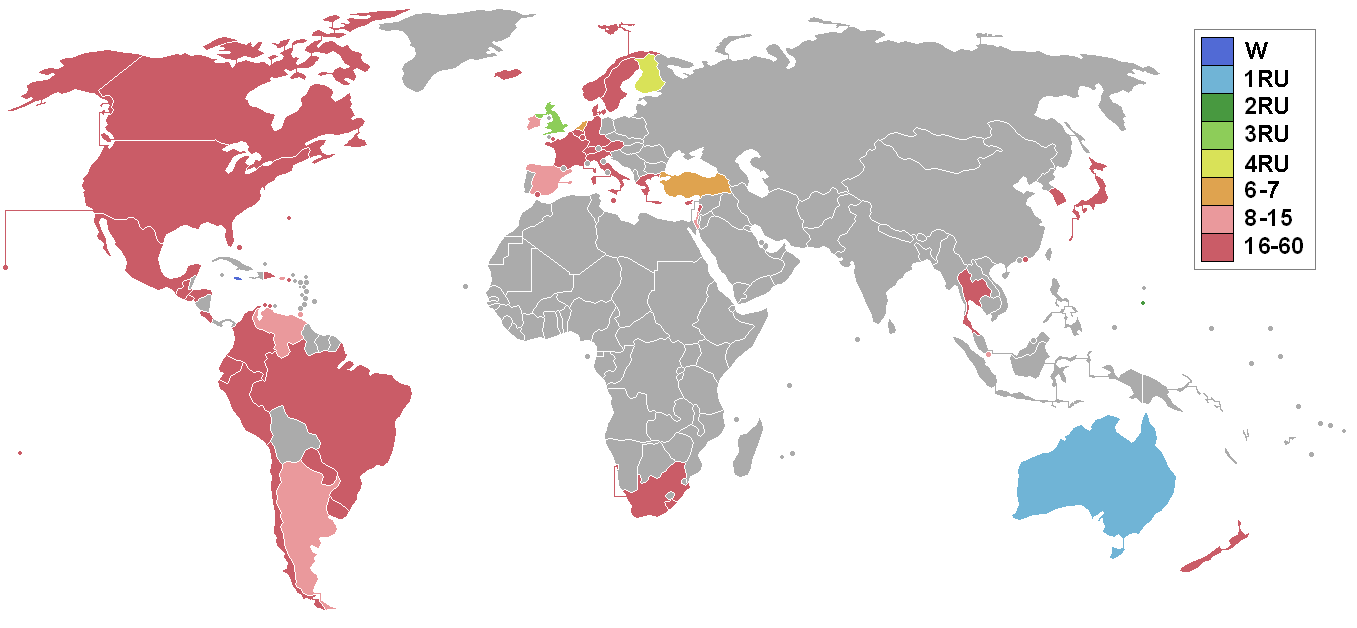
Countries and territories which participated in Miss World 1976 and their placements.

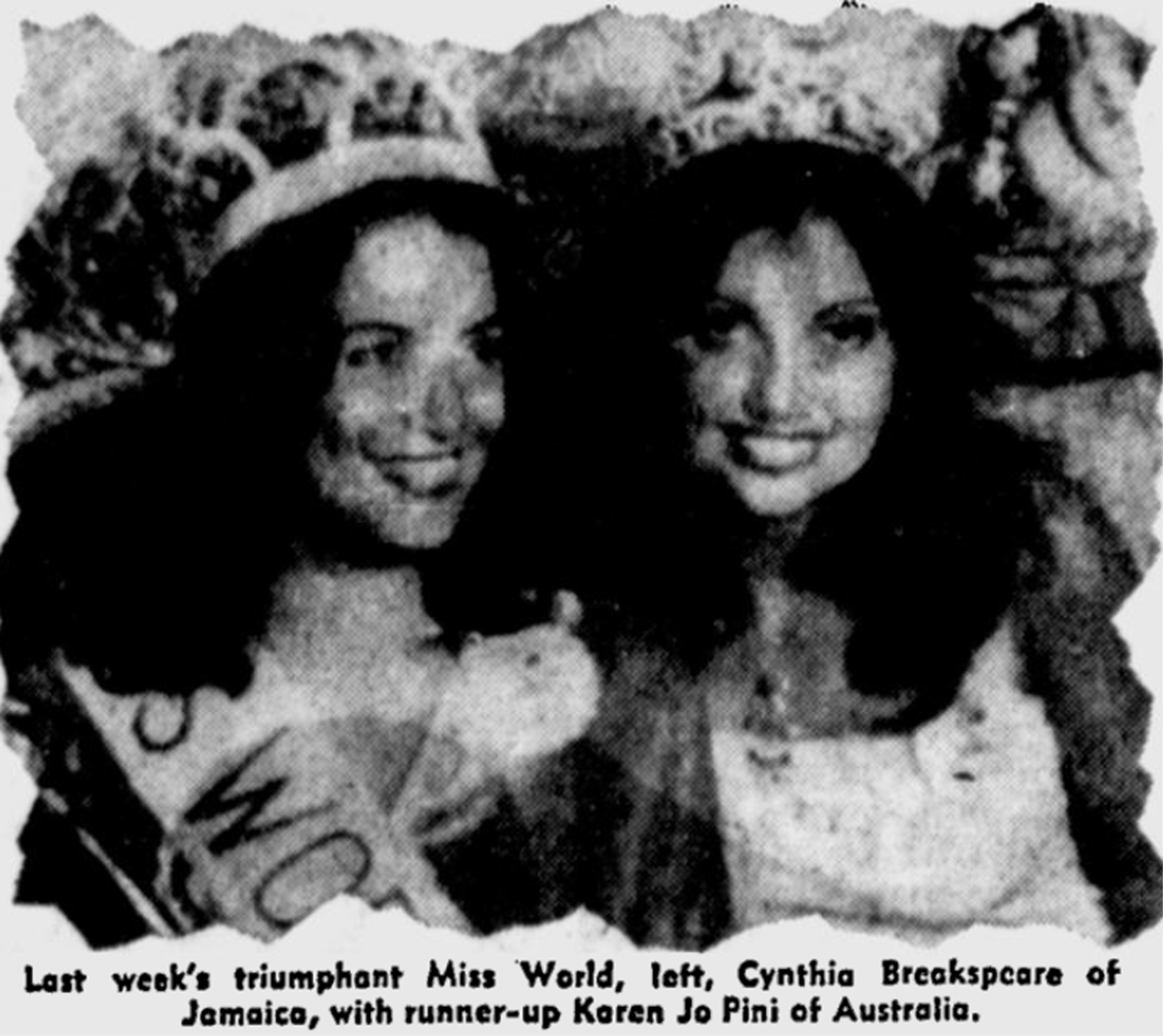
Cindy Breakspeare of Jamaica (left) and her first runner-up Karen Jo Pini of Australia (right)

=== Placements ===
Placement	Contestant
Miss World 1976	Jamaica – Cindy Breakspeare
1st runner-up	Australia – Karen Jo Pini
2nd runner-up	Guam – Diana Marie Duenas
3rd runner-up	United Kingdom – Carol Jean Grant
4th runner-up	Finland – Merja Tammi
Top 7	Netherlands – Stephanie Flatow; Turkey – Jale Bayhan
Top 15	Argentina – Adriana Salguiero; (Republic of Ireland) Ireland – Jakki Moore; Israel – Levana Abarbanel; Puerto Rico – Ivette Rosado; Singapore – Pauline Poh Neo Cheong; Spain – Luz María Polegre; Trinidad and Tobago – Patricia Anderson Leon; Venezuela – María Genoveva Rivero

=== Special awards ===
Award	Contestant
Miss Photogenic	(Republic of Ireland) Ireland – Jakki Moore
Miss Personality	South Africa – Veronica Motsepe

== Pageant ==
=== Format ===
As in 1961, fifteen semi-finalists were chosen through a preliminary competition held on the day of the final competition, which consisted of the swimsuit and evening gown competitions. The fifteen semi-finalists competed in the swimsuit and evening gown competitions, and seven finalists were subsequently chosen to compete in the final interview.

=== Selection committee ===
- Barbara Bain – American actress
- Wentworth Christopher – National Director of Bermuda
- Fred Demmond
- James Hunt – English racecar driver
- Curd Jürgens – Austrian-German actor
- Michael Knotts – English painter
- Wilnelia Merced – Miss World 1975 from Puerto Rico
- Doreen Miller
- Eric Morley – Chairman of Mecca and founder of Miss World
- Mary Peters – English pentathlon athlete
- Demis Roussos – Greek singer
- Yuki Torimaru – Japanese fashion designer

== Contestants ==
Sixty contestants competed for the title.

Country/Territory	Contestant	Age (Note: Ages at the time of the pageant)	Hometown
Argentina	Adriana Salguiero	19	Tres Arroyos
Aruba	Maureen Wever	20	Oranjestad
Australia	Karen Jo Pini	19	Perth
Austria	Monika Mühlbauer	17	Karlstetten
(The Bahamas) Bahamas	Mazorian Larona Miller	19	Nassau
Belgium	Yvette Aelbrecht	18	Brussels
Bermuda	Vivienne Anne Hollis	19	Smith's Parish
Brazil	Adelaida Fraga de Oliveira Filha	18	Brasilia
Canada	Pamela Mercer	20	Ancaster
Chile	María Cristina Granzow	18	Santiago
Colombia	María Loretta Celedón	19	Valledupar
Costa Rica	Ligia María Ramos	23	San Jose
Curaçao	Viveca Marchena	18	Willemstad
Cyprus	Andri Tsangaridou	20	Famagusta
Denmark	Susanne Juul Hansen	18	–
Dominican Republic	Jennyfer del Carmen Corporán	17	Santo Domingo
Ecuador	Marie Clare Fontaine	20	Guayaquil
El Salvador	Soraya Camondari	17	San Salvador
Finland	Merja Tammi	21	Helsinki
France	Monique Uldaric	22	Paris
French Polynesia	Patricia Servonnat	18	Papeete
Germany	Monika Schneeweiss	21	Frankfurt
Gibraltar	Rosemarie Parody	19	Gibraltar
Greece	Rania Theofilou	20	Athens
Guam	Diana Marie Duenas	17	Agana
Guatemala	Marta Elisa Tirado	21	Guatemala City
Honduras	Maribel Ayala	18	San Pedro Sula
Hong Kong	Christine Leung	22	Hong Kong
Iceland	Sigríður Olgeirsdóttir	19	Reykjavík
(Republic of Ireland) Ireland	Jakki Moore	17	Dublin
Israel	Levana Abarbanel	17	Tel Aviv
Italy	Antonella Lombrosi	17	Milan
Jamaica	Cindy Breakspeare	21	Kingston
Japan	Noriko Asakuno	19	Tokyo
Jersey	Susan Hughes	21	St. Helier
Lebanon	Suad Nachoul	21	Beirut
Luxembourg	Monique Wilmes	19	Echternach
Malta	Jane Saliba	18	Żurrieq
Mexico	Carla Jean Evert	19	Acapulco
Netherlands	Stephanie Flatow	23	Rotterdam
New Zealand	Anne Clifford	22	Christchurch
Norway	Nina Rønneberg	21	Oslo
Paraguay	María Cristina Fernández Samaniego	21	Asunción
Peru	Rocío Lazcano	21	Lima
Puerto Rico	Ivette Rosado	19	Bayamón
South Africa	Veronica Motsepe	21	Pretoria
South Africa	Lynn Massyn	18	Durban
South Korea	Shin Byoung-sook	19	Seoul
Spain	Luz María Polegre	18	Tenerife
Sweden	Ann-Christine Gernandt	19	Stockholm
Switzerland	Ruth Crottet	21	Lugano
Thailand	Duangcheewan Komolsen	20	Bangkok
Trinidad and Tobago	Patricia Anderson Leon	21	San Fernando
Turkey	Jale Bayhan	20	Ankara
United Kingdom	Carol Jean Grant	19	Glasgow
United States	Kimberly Foley	21	Southfield
United States Virgin Islands	Denise La Franque	19	Saint Croix
Uruguay	Sara Alaga	19	Salto
Venezuela	María Genoveva Rivero	19	Caracas
