= J. Leslie Kincaid =

American politician

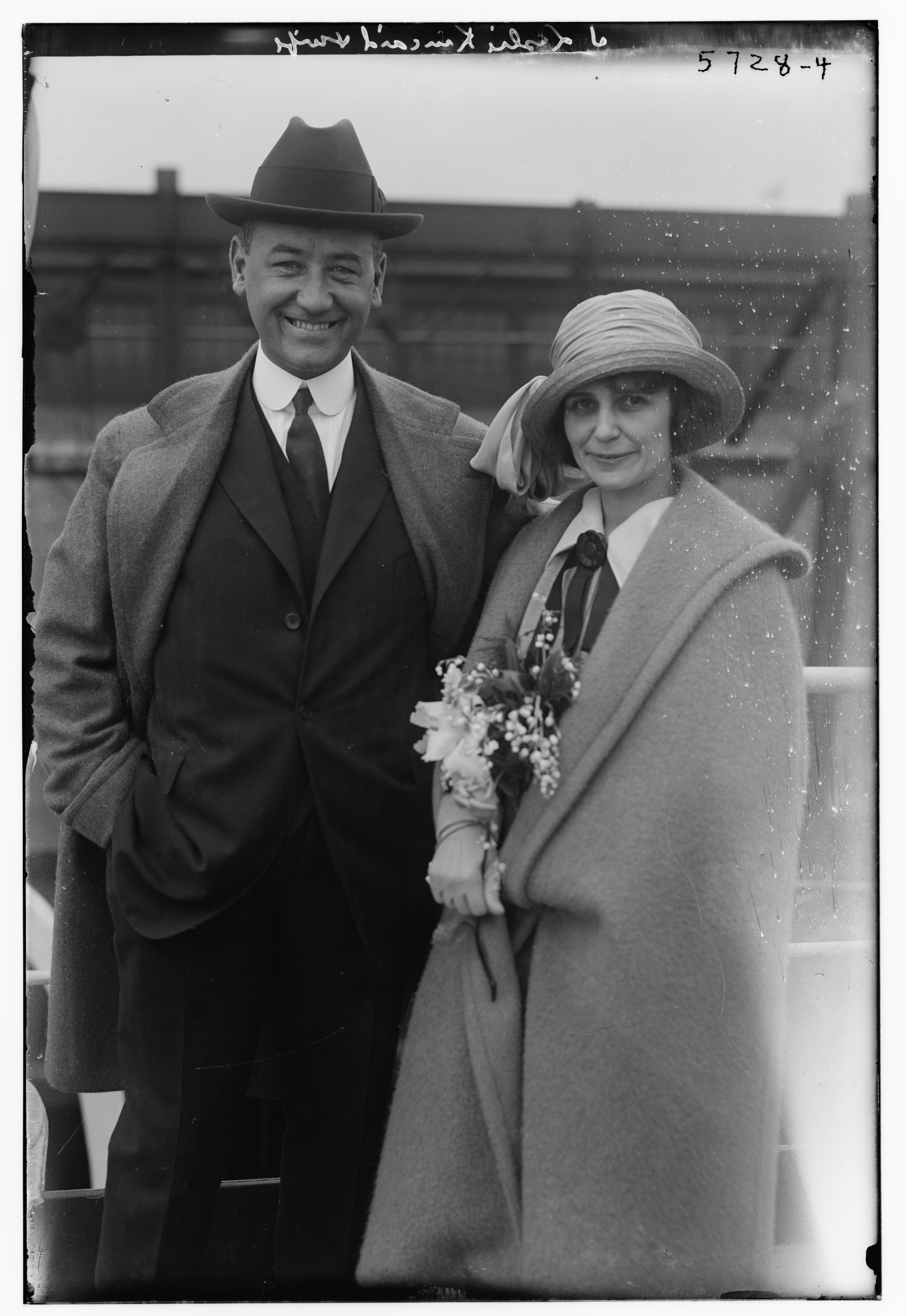
Kincaid and his wife, 1900

James Leslie Kincaid (November 28, 1884 – April 10, 1973) was an American lawyer, politician, businessman, and military officer from New York.

== Early life and education ==
Kincaid was born on November 28, 1884, in Syracuse, New York, the son of James Faucett Kincaid and Carrie Dennis. Kincaid attended the Syracuse grammar and high school. He graduated from Syracuse University Law School in 1909.

== Career ==
He was admitted to the bar in 1909 and began practicing law in Syracuse with the office of Nottingham, Nottingham & Edgcomb. He also worked as Secretary of J. F. Kincaid, Inc., which conducted a general retail business in Syracuse. In 1914, he was elected to the New York State Assembly as a Republican, representing the Onondaga County 2nd District. He served in the Assembly in 1915 and 1916. While in the Assembly, he was appointed a member of the Joint Committee of the Legislature to investigate the New York Public Service Commission.

In 1904, Kincaid joined the New York National Guard as a private in Troop D, Cavalry. He was promoted over the years to corporal, sergeant, 1st sergeant, and lieutenant. When the cavalry was organized into a regiment, he became squadron adjutant, 2nd Squadron. He was then promoted to major and put in command of the squadron. In 1911, he was appointed an aide-de-camp on the staff of Major-General John F. O'Ryan, a position he held until 1914. He was also an aide on Governor Whitman. During the outbreak at the Mexican border, he became major, Judge Advocate-General's Department, was assigned to the Division Staff, 6th Division, New York National Guard, and served in that capacity throughout the conflict. He then acted as chief of the Federal Registration Bureau, State of New York, and charged with all preliminary operations connected with executing the Selective Service Act in the state.

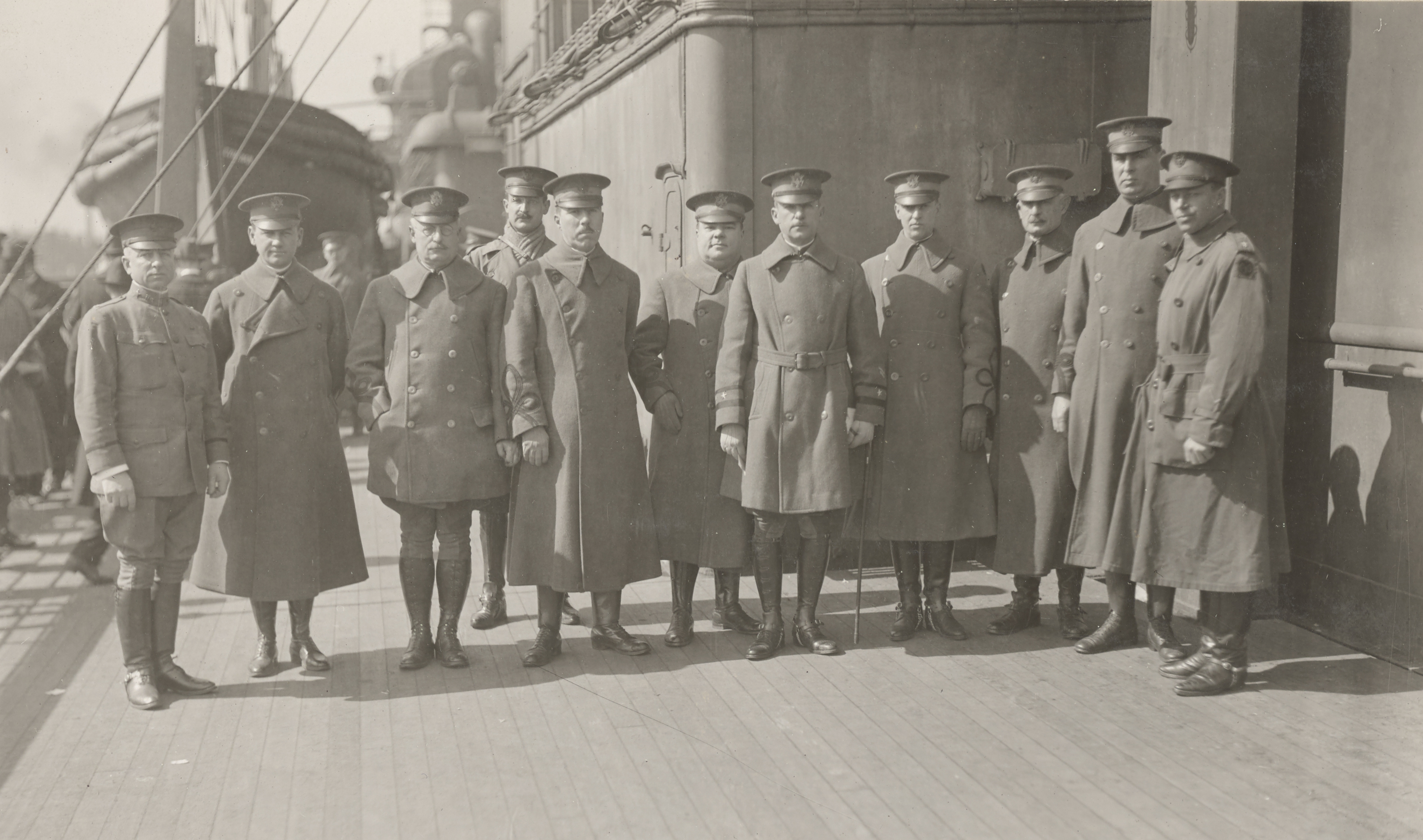
Major General O'Ryan and members of his staff on the top deck of the Leviathan, March 1919. Stood second on the left is Lieutenant Colonel J. Leslie Kincaid.

When America entered World War I, he entered the service with his former rank and position. In May 1918, he went overseas with the 27th Division. He served with that Division in France and Belgium until February 1919. He was decorated by Field Marshal Douglas Haig for gallantry in action. He was promoted to lieutenant-colonel just before returning to the United States, and when he returned he was in command of the advance party of the 27th Division and in charge of all arrangements for the reception and homecoming of the New York National Guard Division. Governor Al Smith promoted him to colonel, Judge Advocate-General's Department, New York National Guard. He served in that position until 1921, when Governor Nathan L. Miller appointed him Adjutant General of New York.

Kincaid served as Adjutant General until 1922, after which he became an unassigned brigadier general of the reserves. He was breveted major general by Governor Smith in 1923. After he returned from France in 1919, he entered the legal department of the United Hotels Company of America, a large chain group of hotels, as assistant to the president. He served as the vice-president from 1921 to 1926. In 1924, he became president of the American Hotels Corporation, a management corporation that directed the operation of forty eight hotels. In 1933, he was industrial advisor to the National Recovery Administration in regards to the hotel code.

During World War II, Kincaid served in North Africa, Italy, and France. He also served as military governor of Naples. Later, he became the Army's hotel supervisor and took over from the French the hotels and facilities along the Riviera for the United States Riviera Recreational Center. Over the course of his military service, he was decorated with the Distinguished Service Cross, the Distinguished Service Order from Great Britain, Chevalier of the Legion of Honor of France, the Officer Order of the Crown from Belgium and the Commander Order of the Crown from Italy. He left military service in April 1945, and in 1953 with the rank of brigadier general.

Kincaid was president of the Lexington Avenue Civic Association and a member of the Freemasons, the Lotos Club, and the Army and Navy Club. He was a Methodist. In 1914, he married Ada Shinaman of Fort Plain, New York. They had two daughters, Jane and Dorothy.

== Death ==
Kincaid died at his home in Captiva Island, Florida, on April 10, 1973. He was buried in Arlington National Cemetery.

New York State Assembly
Preceded by George M. Haight	New York State Assembly; Onondaga County, 2nd District; 1915–1916	Succeeded by Harley J. Crane
