= Tracy S. Robinson =

Jamaican lawyer

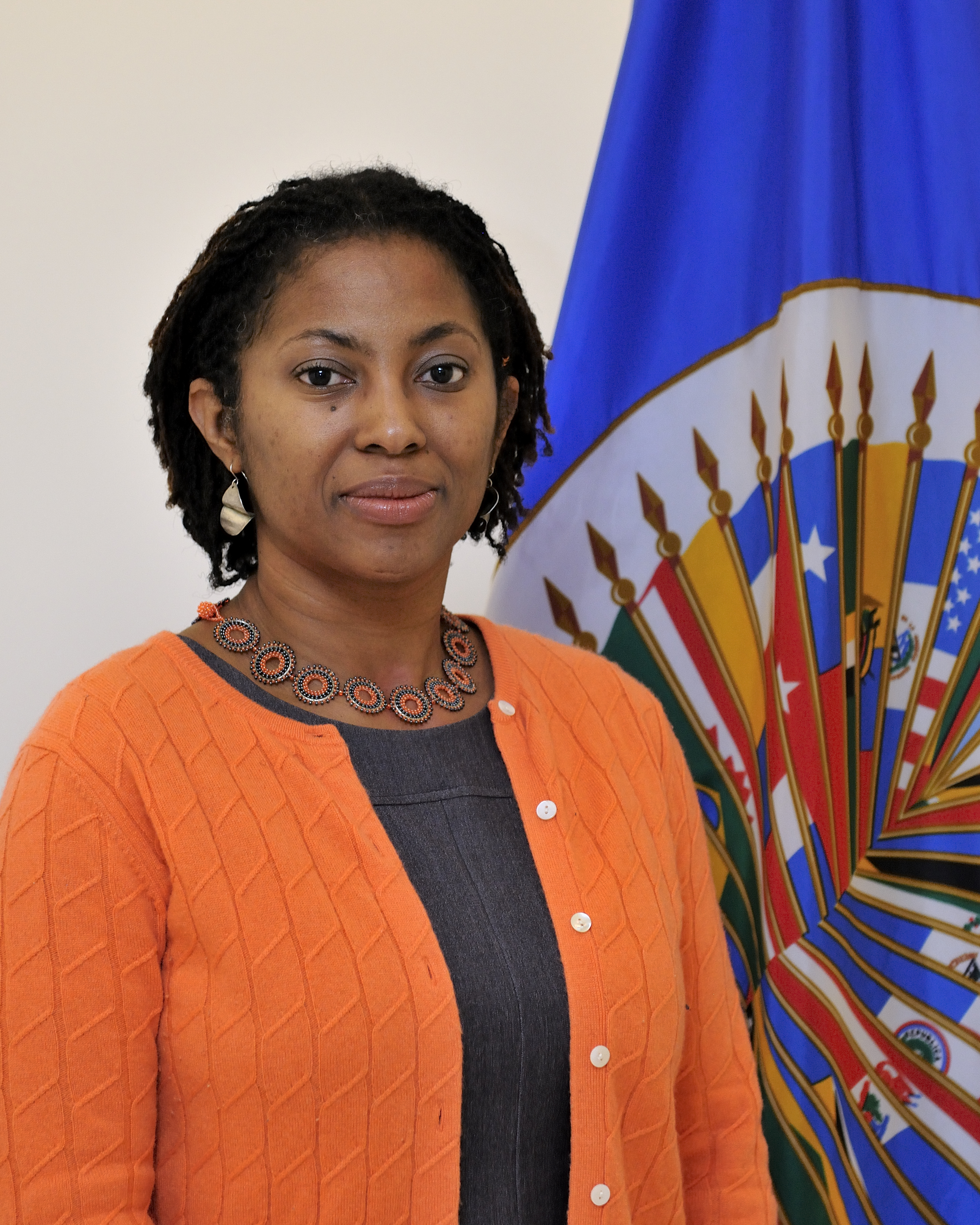
- Education: University of the West Indies; Oxford University; Yale University
- Occupation: Commissioner of the Inter-American Commission on Human Rights
- Years active: 2012–2015
- Employer: University of the West Indies
- Known for: Human rights activism

Tracy S. Robinson is Jamaican attorney and lecturer in the Faculty of Law at the University of the West Indies (UWI). She served as commissioner on the Inter-American Commission on Human Rights (IACHR) from 2012 to 2015 and in 2014 was elected as chair of the organization. She has served as the Rapporteur on the Rights of Women since January 2012 for the Organization of American States (OAS) and helped establish the Rapporteurship on the rights of LGBTI, serving as its first Rapporteur.

== Biography ==
Tracy Robinson grew up in Jamaica, attending Immaculate Conception High School. She continued her education at the University of the West Indies, earning a law degree with honours in 1991. In 1992, she attended Oxford University as a Rhodes Scholar earning a bachelor's degree in Civil Law. She then earned a master's in Law from Yale University.

Robinson is a senior lecturer at the University of the West Indies, Mona Campus, in the Faculty of Law, where she lectures on constitutional and human rights law; family law; and, law and gender. Her focus is on social inequality and the impact of gender and sexuality on legal vulnerability and empowerment. Her expertise is focused in human rights law and includes child rights, gender-based violence, same-sex sexuality and the law, sexual harassment, sexual and reproductive rights, and sex work and the law, and how civil society, Caribbean governments and intergovernmental organisations, and international organisations interpret and utilize law in these areas. She is a co-founder of UWI's Rights Advocacy Project (U-RAP), which has worked to promote human rights and social justice in the Caribbean. U-RAP has participated in human rights litigation with other in human rights lawyers and human rights organisations. She also co-founded and serves as the co-coordinator for the Faculty's Workshop Series (FWS), which provides legal analysis and research to organisations, such as the Caribbean Court of Justicepe and various appellate courts.

As a lawyer, she has tackled such issues as women's poverty and child support, protection for human rights defenders who are working on equality issues, and equality for LGBTI Caribbean citizens. Robinson has served as editor of the Caribbean Law Bulletin and has written reports on topics including a wide range of human rights issues. In addition, she has served as a consultant to Caribbean governments and international agencies such as the United Nations Development Fund for Women and UNICEF on legislation and topics related to gender and children rights.

She was elected to serve as a commissioner on the Inter-American Commission on Human Rights (IACHR) in 2011, with a term from 2012 to 2015. Simultaneously, she took office in January 2012 as the OAS's Rapporteur on the Rights of Women. During her tenure, she helped establish the Rapporteurship on the rights of LGBTI, serving as its first Rapporteur, and in 2014 was elected as the Chair of the IACHR through 31 December 2015.
