= Utica Canal Terminal Harbor =

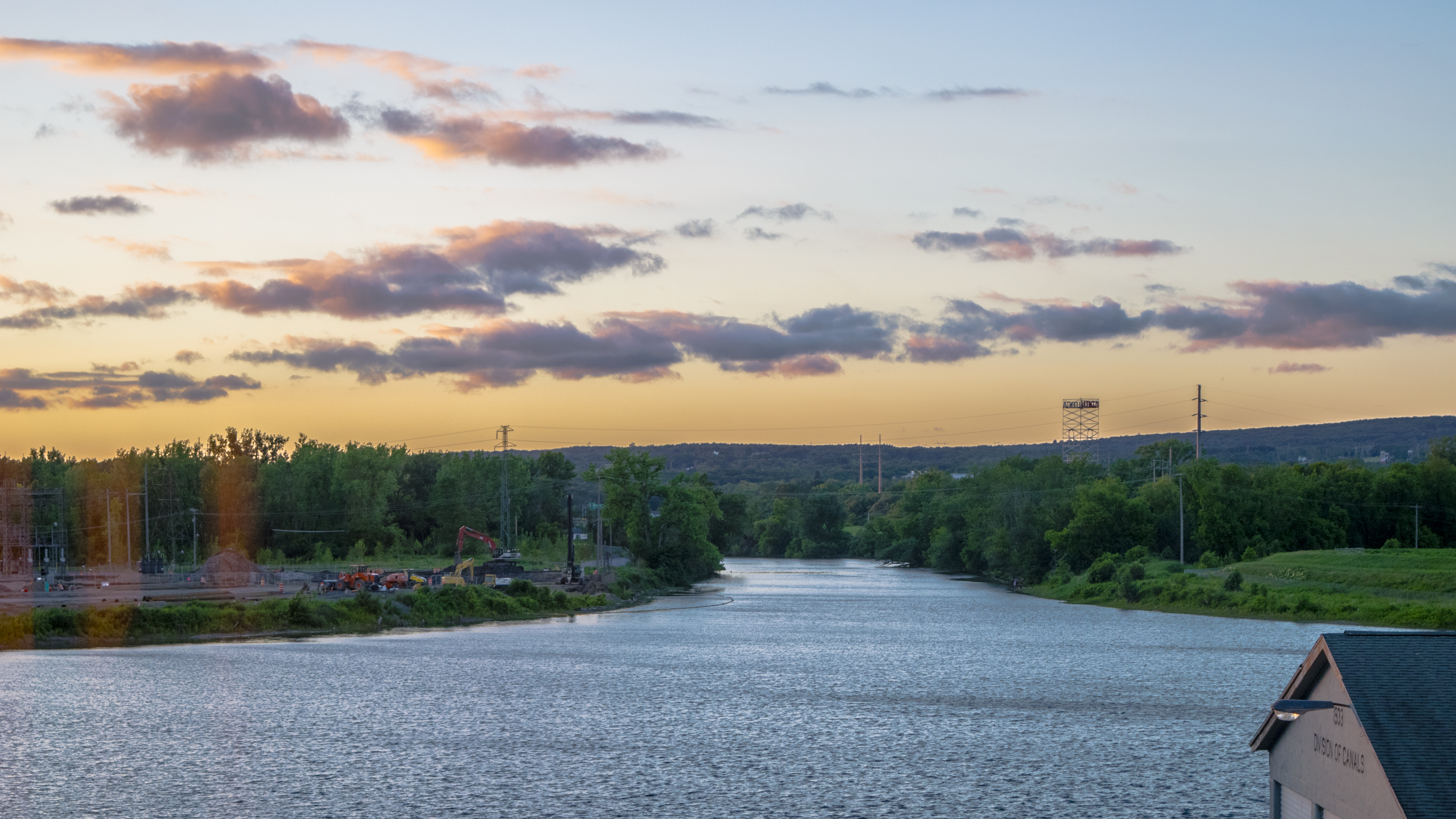
- Harbor in 2015 looking north

- Location within New York Location within the United States
- Location: Oneida County, New York
- Coordinates: 43°06′35″N 75°13′25″W
- Primary outflows: Mohawk River, Erie Canal
- Surface elevation: 394 feet (120 m)
- Settlements: Utica

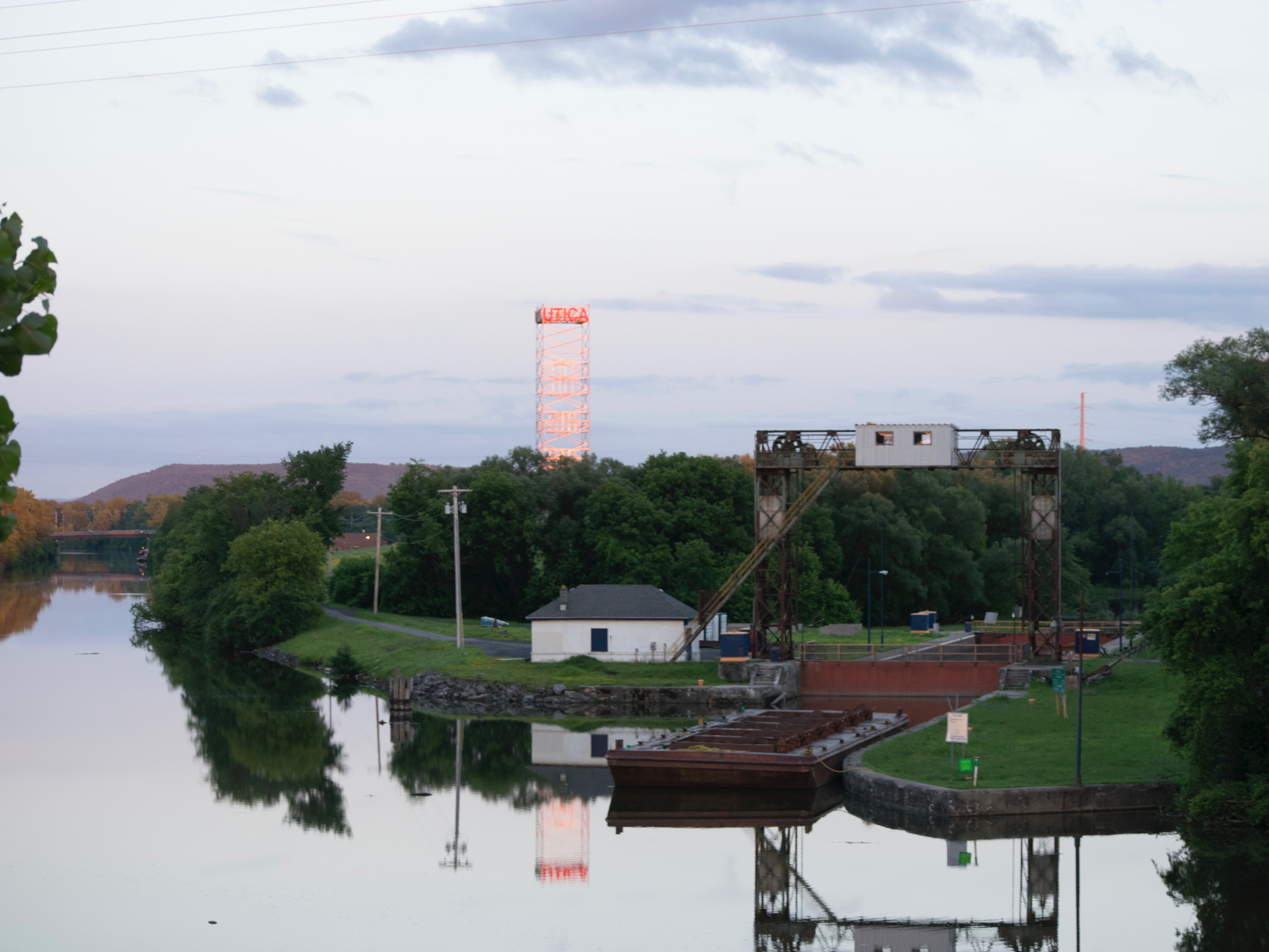
The Utica Tower and harbor lock.

Utica Canal Terminal Harbor, commonly known as Utica Harbor, is a small man-made harbor in Utica, Oneida County, New York. The harbor was once connected to the Mohawk River and the Erie Canal by the Utica Harbor Lock, which is now permanently closed and used only for flood control.
