= Immaculate Conception High School (Jamaica) =

Location
- 152c Constant Spring Road; Kingston; Jamaica
- 18.04395°N 76.79218°W

Information
- Other names: Immac, 1Immac
- Type: Public secondary school
- Motto: Ad Astra Per Aspera (Through Difficulty to Excellence (Literally: Through Difficulties to the stars)
- Religious affiliation: Christian
- Denomination: Roman Catholic
- Patron saint: Our Lady of Immaculate Conception
- Founded: 1858; 168 years ago
- Founder: Scottish Franciscan Sisters
- Status: Open
- Principal: Stacey Wilson Reynolds
- Gender: Female
- Age range: 10-19
- Enrolment: About 1,500
- Language: English
- Houses: 7
- Colours: Blue and White
- Mascot: Wolf
- Accreditation: CSEC, CAPE
- Yearbook: Our World
- Website: www.immaculatehigh.edu.jm

Immaculate Conception High School (ICHS) is a Roman Catholic High School for girls in Saint Andrew Parish, Jamaica. About 1500 girls are enrolled.

== History ==
In January 1858, the Scottish Franciscan Sisters set up a Preparatory and Secondary School for girls at Duke Street in Kingston. The School was dedicated to and named after Our Lady of Immaculate Conception. In January 1879, the Scottish Franciscans handed over the school to the Franciscan Sisters of Allegany. Mothers Paula and Veronica set a high standard of achievement which is today still being preserved.

In the summer of 1858, the school moved to Duke Street. On Saturday 23 October 1937, the ICHS was burnt to ashes in a terrible fire that started a block away at a beauty parlor. The school moved to Old Hope Road (temporarily) and then in 1941, the school acquired the Constant Spring Hotel (which was operated by Niagara Falls businessman Frank A. Dudley and the United Hotels Company of America in 1933.) which is now used for the Immaculate Conception High School, Preparatory School and Convent.

The school was separated into two sections, one section for the English speaking students of Jamaica and the other for French speaking students of Haiti. Due to the lack of Haitian students, the French section has been closed down.

The school was a boarding and day school.

== Campus ==
ICHS is located on a large campus with many facilities including:

- Administrative Block
- Faculty Room
- School Chapel
- Library
- Classrooms
- Performing Arts Centre
- 5 Computer Rooms
- Medical Room
- Offices of Guidance Counsellors
- Book Store
- Science Building
- 2 Home Economics Labs
- 2 Art Studios
- 3 Audio-Visual Rooms
- Campus Ministry Room
- Cafeteria
- Music House
- School Pool
- Tennis Court
- Netball Court
- Summer House
- Sixth Form Lounge
- Drama House

== Insignia ==
Motto

- Ad Astra Per Aspera "Through Difficulties to Excellence"

Emblem

- The Franciscan Coat of Arms.

== Notable alumnae ==
- Politics and Law
  - Shahine Robinson, MP for St Ann
  - Tracy Robinson, senior lecturer in the Faculty of Law, University of the West Indies (UWI) Mona, Jamaica; Rhodes Scholar 1992
- Sports
  - Sanya Richards-Ross, American track and field athlete
  - Alia Atkinson, Jamaican swimmer and Olympian

== See also ==
- Education in Jamaica
