= Ray Wagner =

American football player (1902–1990)

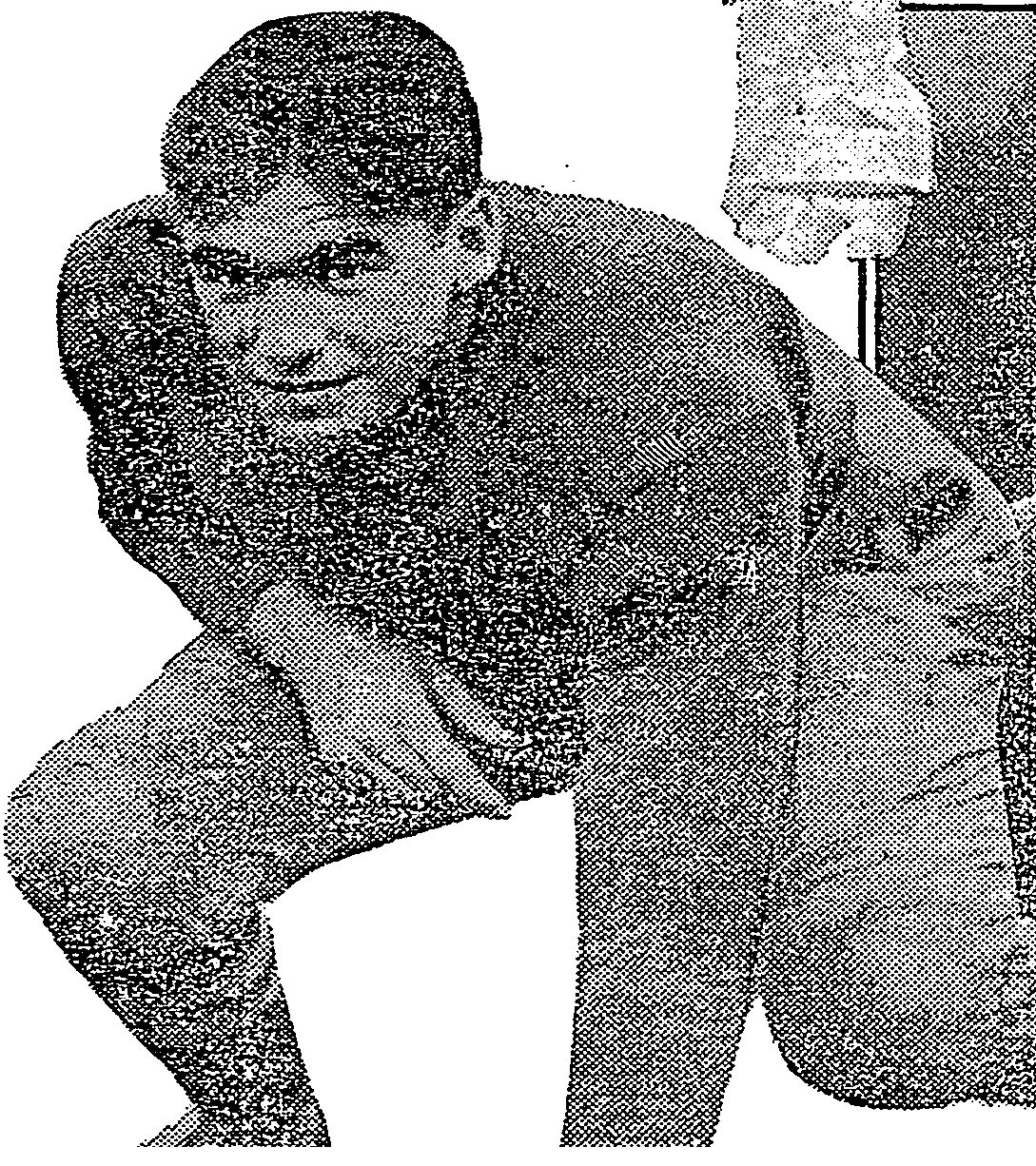
- Wagner in 1925

No. 63
- Position: End

Personal information
- Born: February 25, 1902; Buffalo, New York
- Died: December 3, 1990 (aged 88); St. Petersburg, Florida
- Listed height: 5 ft 10 in (1.78 m)
- Listed weight: 173 lb (78 kg)

Career information
- High school: Buffalo (NY) Fosdick-Masten Park
- College: Columbia

Career history
- Orange Tornadoes (1929); Newark Tornadoes (1930); Buffalo Indians (1931)

Awards and highlights
- Third-team All-American (1925)

Raymond John Wagner (February 25, 1902 – December 3, 1990) was an American football player. Parker was born in Buffalo, New York, and attended Fosdick-Masten Park High School before enrolling at Columbia University. He played college football at the end position for the Columbia Lions football team and was selected by the All-America Board as a third-team player on the 1925 College Football All-America Team. He also played three years as an end in the National Football League for the Orange Tornadoes (one game, 1929), Newark Tornadoes (five games, 1930), and Buffalo Indians (six games, 1931). Wagner died in 1990 at age 88 in St. Petersburg, Florida.
