= The Grid District =

Urban development in Massachusetts, US

Coordinates: 42.262°N 71.803°W

The Grid District is a collection of buildings in downtown Worcester, Massachusetts.

== Description ==
When finished, the Grid District will have 510 residential units, 60,000 square feet of retail and restaurant space and parking spaces. The buildings included in the Grid District are the Park Plaza apartments at 507 Main Street; Bancroft Commons apartments at 50 Franklin Street; 56 Franklin Street, which is home to Brew on The Grid; the Paris Cinema building, 66 Franklin Street; 72 Franklin Street, which is leased by Becker College for student housing; and the Houghton Building at 82 Franklin Street.

The Paris Cinema building has been under threat of taking by eminent domain by the city, but is now scheduled to be demolished in 2016 and replaced with pop-up retail space in the short term.

== Background ==
MG2 acquired the Bancroft Commons building in the 1990s, which became the genesis of the Grid District. The owner of record is Fifty Franklin LLC, a domestic limited liability corporation listing John McGrail, MG2’s president, as a signatory of the corporation, according to public records. Bancroft on the Commons (landmarked as the Bancroft Hotel, and referred to as Bancroft Commons) has been updated and the lobby was recently rebuilt as part of the redevelopment of downtown Worcester. The Grid District is part of a 118-acre (48 ha) area subject to an urban redevelopment plan proposed by the Worcester Redevelopment Authority. The area that MG2 owns is about 6 acres (2.4 ha). Within these 6 acres, five restaurants and a coffee shop, with a total of 550 seats, are scheduled to open next year. The restaurant group developing these restaurants plans to use them to launch new brands throughout New England or nationwide.
