= Dnipro Ukraine =

Dnipro Ukraine may refer to:

- Dnipro, city and administrative center of Dnipropetrovsk Oblast, Ukraine
- Dnieper Ukraine, historical region in Ukraine
- Dnipro Ukrainian Cultural Center, club in Buffalo, New York
