= Taylor Signal Company-General Railway Signal Company =

- U.S. National Register of Historic Places
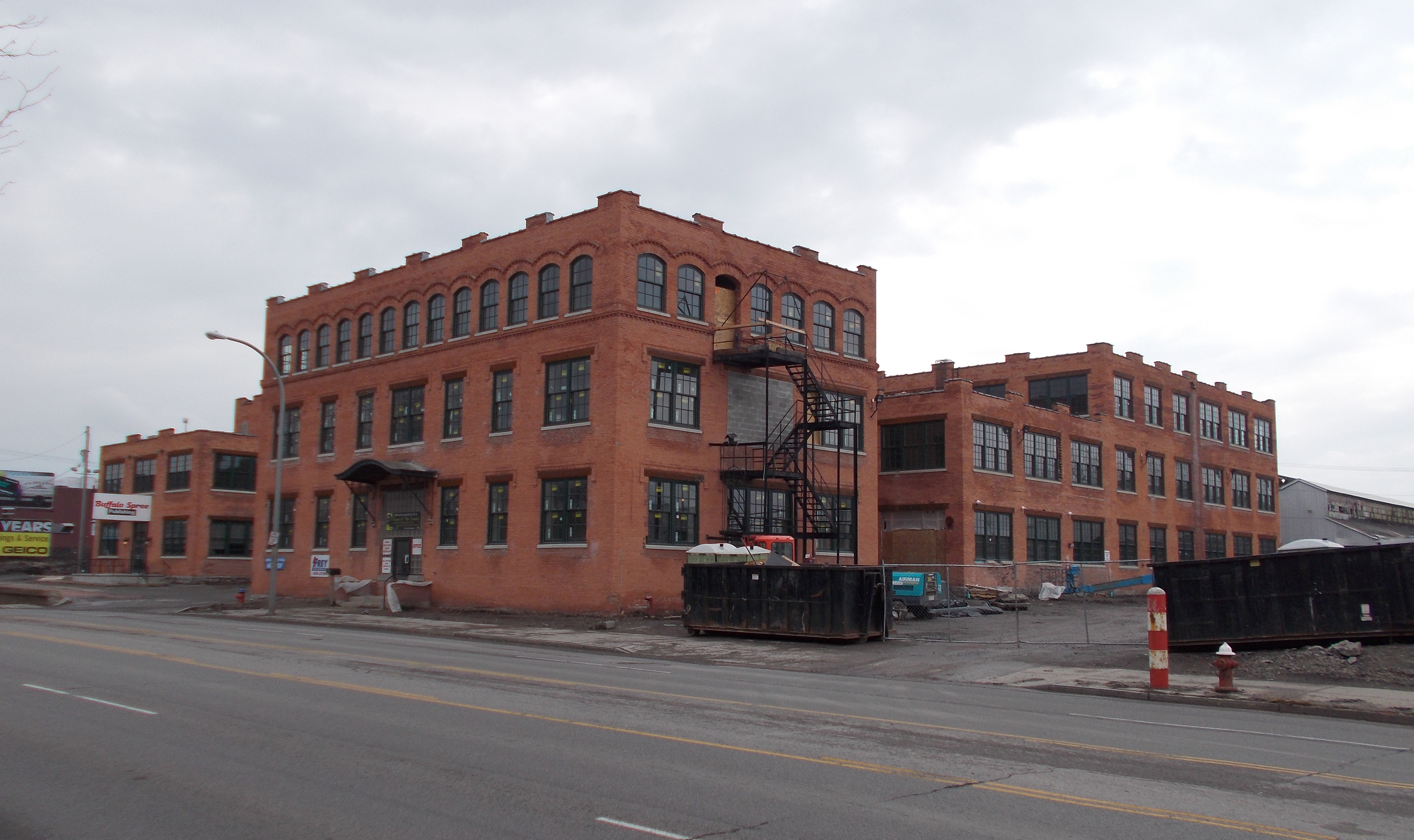
- Taylor Signal Company-General Railway Signal Company, April 2014

- Location within New York Location within the United States
- Location: 1738 Elmwood Ave., Buffalo, New York
- Coordinates: 42°56′41″N 78°52′42″W
- Area: 2.57 acres (1.04 ha)
- Built: 1902-1906
- Architect: Esenwein & Johnson
- Architectural style: Gothic, daylight factory
- NRHP reference No.: 14000260
- Added to NRHP: May 27, 2014

Taylor Signal Company-General Railway Signal Company is a historic industrial complex located in Buffalo, Erie County, New York. It was designed by the architectural firm of Esenwein & Johnson and built between 1902 and 1906. The daylight factory complex consists of a rectangular two and three-story brick factory building with a central light court and wings. It has a three-story brick office building fronting on Elmwood Avenue and connected to the factory by a hyphen. The office building features Gothic Revival style design elements. The complex housed the Taylor Signal Company/General Railway Signal Company until 1907, when operations were moved to Rochester, New York. Afterwards, it housed a number of manufacturing companies including the Century Telephone Construction Company, General Drop Forge Company, Curtiss Aeroplane and Motor Company, and Lippard-Stewart Motor Car Company. The complex has been renovated to house a hotel, banquet facility, and loft apartments.

It was listed on the National Register of Historic Places in 2014.
