= Linde Air Products Factory =

- U.S. National Register of Historic Places
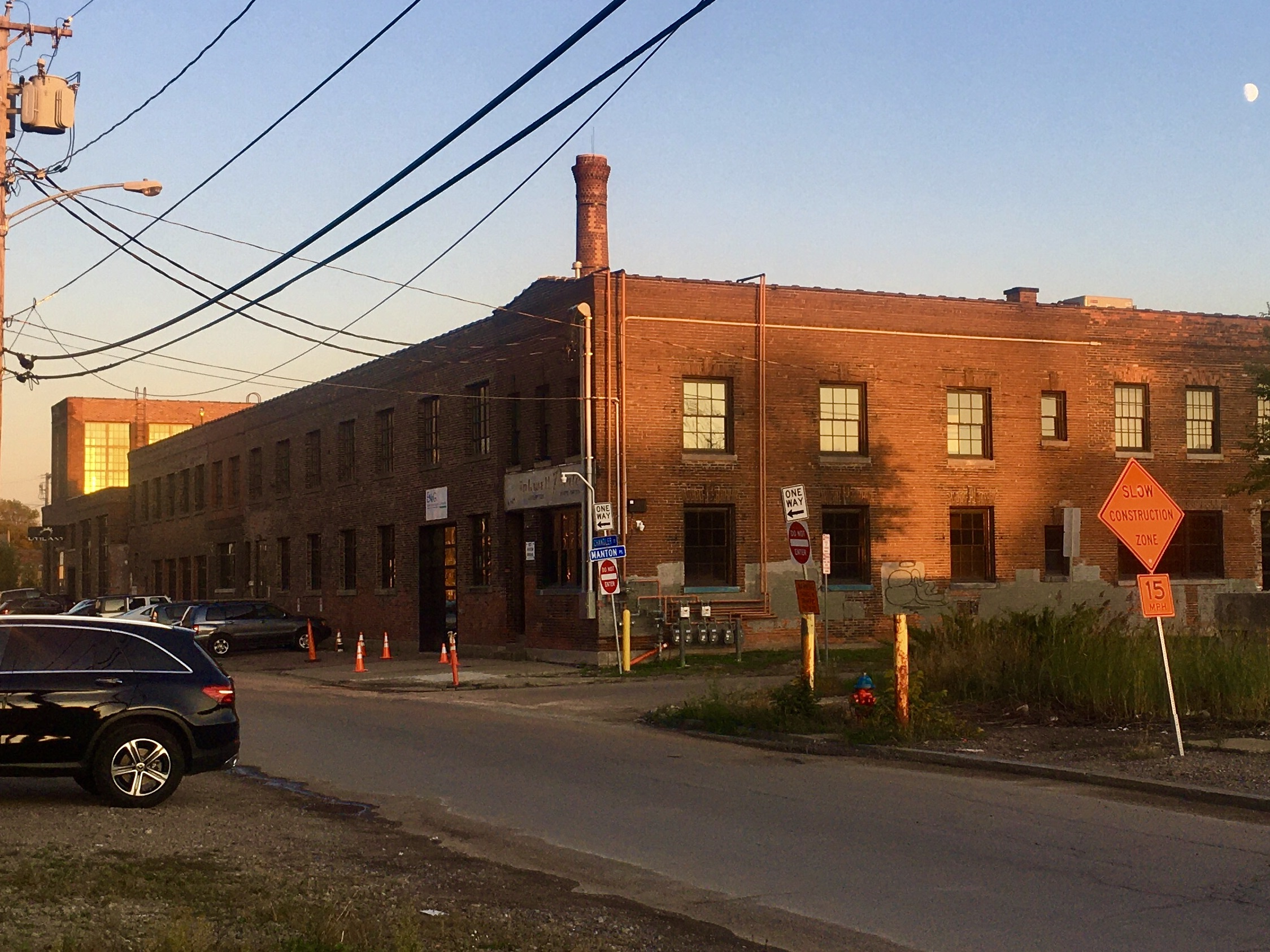
- Linde Air Products Factory, October 2019

- Location within New York Location within the United States
- Location: 155 Chandler Street, Buffalo, New York
- Coordinates: 42°56′36″N 78°53′09″W
- Area: 1.98 acres (0.80 ha)
- Built: 1907, 1911, 1916, 1934, 1948
- Architect: James B. McCreary (1907 Factory), Esenwein & Johnson (1910, 1911 Additions)
- MPS: Black Rock Planning Neighborhood MPS
- NRHP reference No.: 100001584
- Added to NRHP: September 11, 2017

Linde Air Products Factory, also known as the Chandler Street Plant, is a historic liquid oxygen factory building in the Black Rock neighborhood of Buffalo, New York, United States. It was listed on the National Register of Historic Places in 2017.

The original two-story section was built in 1907 of solid masonry construction with double-hung wood windows, brick piers, and pitched roofs. Red brick additions were made to the original building through 1948. The present building has a C-shaped plan that is nearly fully enclosed around a center courtyard and measuring approximately 300 feet wide by 275 feet deep.

The building housed the first oxygen extraction facility in America and was later dubbed "the birthplace of the oxygen industry in the United States." It also served as the primary research facility for the Linde Air Products Company from 1923 until 1942. The building has been redeveloped as a kombucha brewery, cider works, orthodontic laboratory, loft apartments and utilant llc (insurtech company.
