= General Railway Signal =

American manufacturer of railway signaling equipment

Coordinates: 43°04′03″N 77°40′09″W

General Railway Signal Company
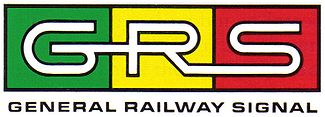
- Type: Private
- Industry: Engineering
- Predecessor: Pneumatic Signal Company; Taylor Signal Co. New York and Standard Railroad Signal Company
- Founded: 1904; 122 years ago
- Founder: John Taylor
- Defunct: 1998; 28 years ago
- Fate: Merged with Alstom
- Successor: Alstom
- Headquarters: Rochester, New York, United States
- Area served: Worldwide
- Key people: John Taylor, Wilmer Salmon, Winthrop Howe
- Products: Level crossing signals, railway signalling
- Number of employees: 350

General Railway Signal Company (GRS) was an American manufacturing company located in the Rochester, New York area. GRS was focused on railway signaling equipment, systems and services. The company was established in 1904 and became part of Alstom Transport in 1998. GRS was a member of the Dow Jones Industrial Average from 1928 to 1930.

== History ==
GRS was founded in 1904 with the merger of three companies (Pneumatic Signal Company of Rochester, New York; Taylor Signal Co. of Buffalo, New York and Standard Railroad Signal Company of Arlington, New Jersey). In 1923 GRS acquired the Federal Signal Company of Albany, New York.

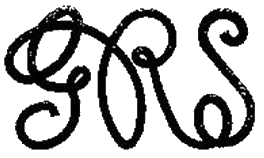
Company's former logo

General Railway Signal was one of the 30 stocks when the Dow Jones Industrial Average was expanded from a 20-stock average on October 1, 1928. It was replaced in the DJIA by Liggett & Myers on July 18, 1930. In 1965,General Signal Corporation (GSX) was created with the intent to diversify into areas other than railway signaling. GRS was a wholly owned subsidiary of GSX.

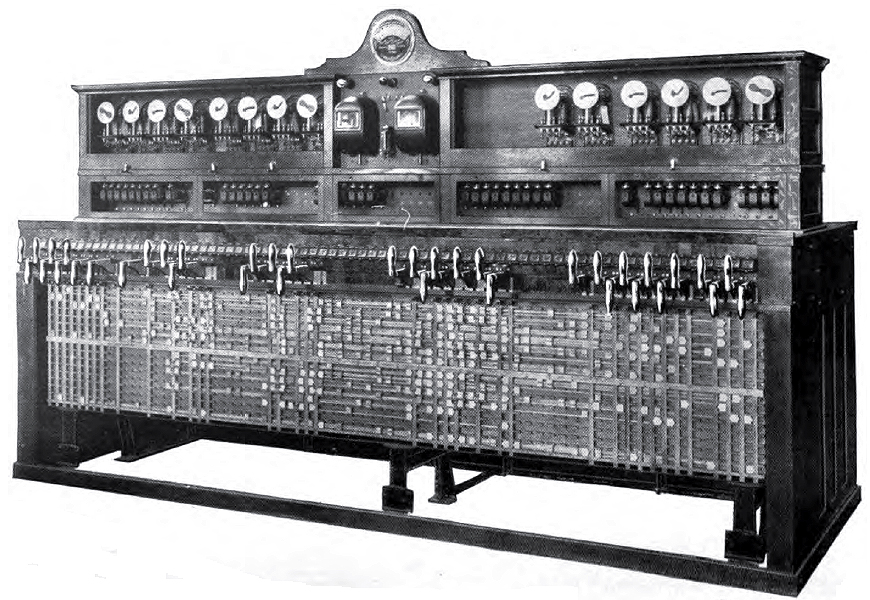
GRS Model 2 interlocking machine (1915)

In 1960, GRS opened the "General Railway Signal Company de Argentina" (GRSA) division in Buenos Aires, which provided manufacture, installation and technical support of GRS railroad signalling systems in Argentina. Some local railroad lines that were provided with GRSA products were Belgrano Norte, Belgrano Sur, Urquiza and Sarmiento. Most of the signals remain active. Among their products are railroad crossing signalling parts, branded with the GRSA logo, instead of the usual GRS. This facility was closed in the early 1980s.

In 1986, GRS joined with China National Railway Signal & Communication Group Corporation (CRSC) to form the Chinese-American Signal Company (CASCO) in Shanghai, China, which produces products and systems for railways in the People's Republic of China.

In 1989, GRS was acquired by the Italian company Sasib and joined the Sasib Railways group. From its founding until 1993, GRS main office and manufacturing facilities were located at 801 West Avenue in Rochester. In 1993, it moved to two new suburban facilities: administration and engineering to Sawgrass Drive in Brighton, and manufacturing to John Street in West Henrietta. In 1998, it became part of Alstom, when Alstom acquired Sasib Railways. The GRS name is no longer used. All products now use the Alstom brand.

== Products ==
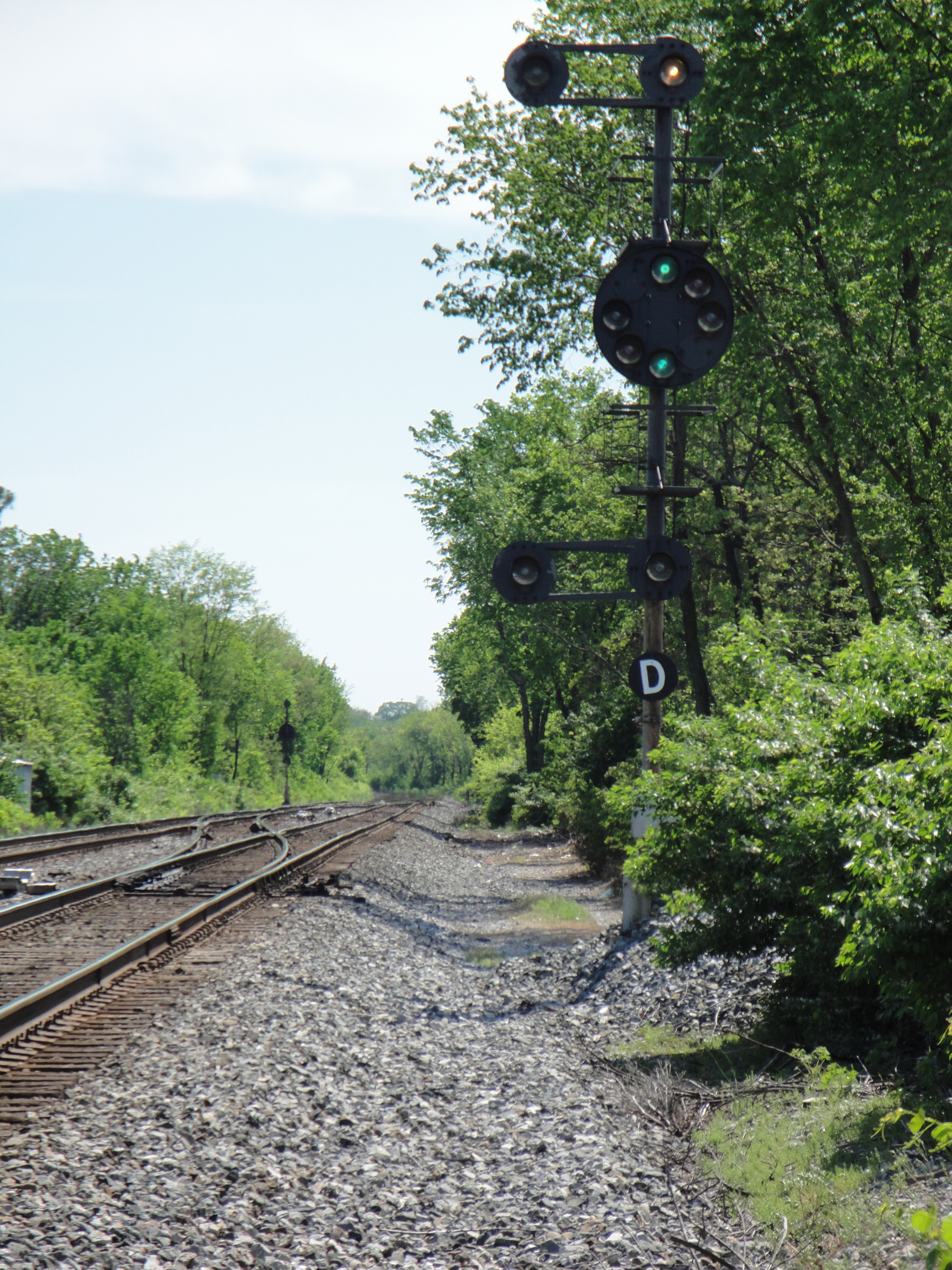
GRS color position light signal on CSX in Beltsville, Maryland, April 2011

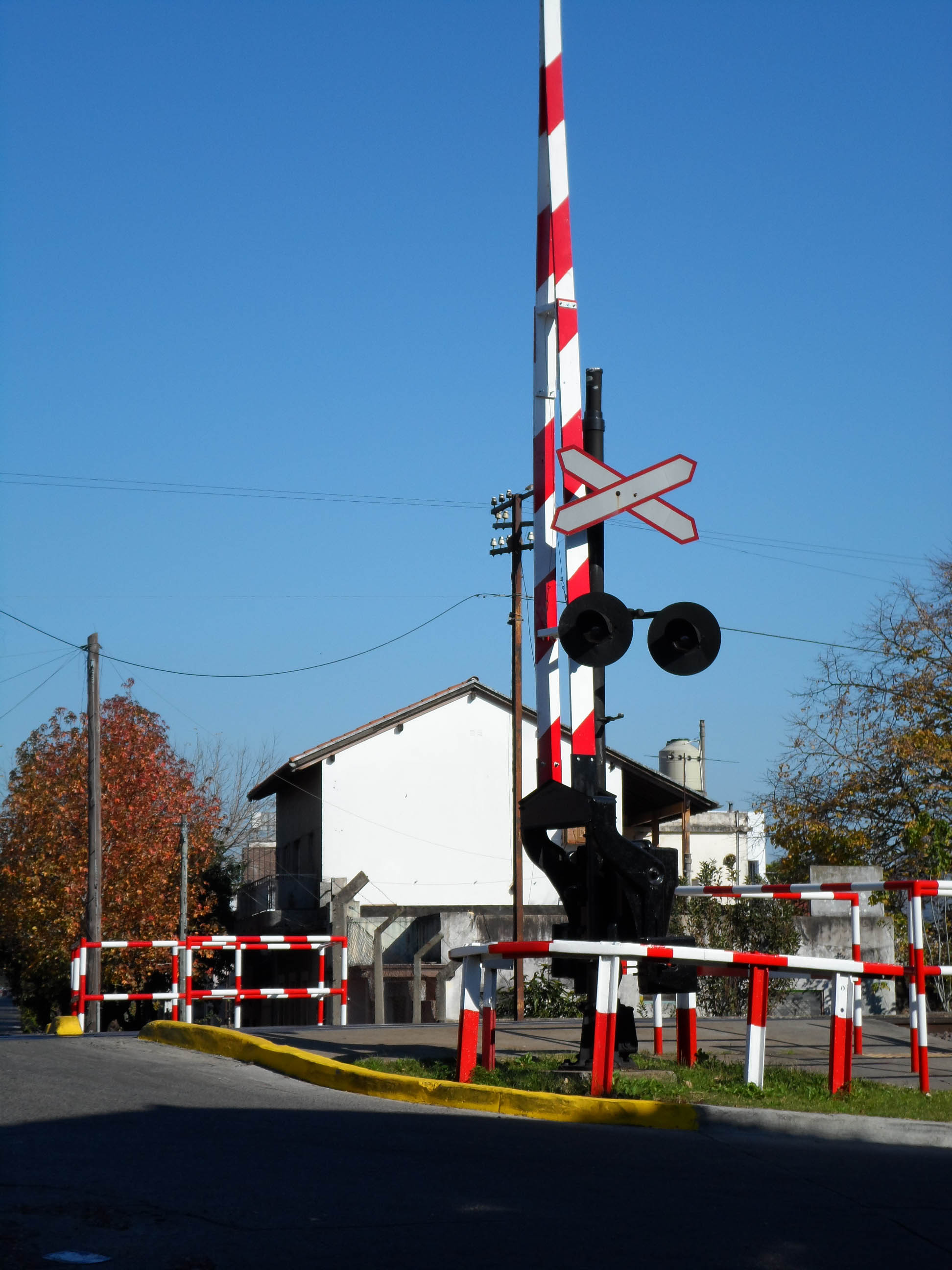
Argentine level crossing signals on Belgrano Norte Line, May 2014

=== Carborne signaling equipment ===
- Automatic Train Control
- Automatic Train Protection
- Automatic train stop

=== Wayside signaling ===
- DC code systems
- Electronic communication systems
- Electronic interlocking
- Relays
- Signals
- switch machines
- track circuits
- trip stops
- yard retarders

=== Central control signaling ===
- Computer-based Manual Control Systems
- Computer-based Traffic Management Systems
- Dark territory control systems
- Electro-mechanical centralized traffic control (cTc) machines
- Yard control systems

== Clients ==
=== Railroads ===
- (United States) Amtrak
- (United States) BNSF Railway
- (United States) CSX Transportation
- (United States) Kansas City Southern Railway
- (United States) Norfolk Southern Railway
- (United States) Union Pacific Railroad
- (Argentina) Ferrocarriles Argentinos
- (Australia) Transport Asset Holding Entity
- (Brazil) Estrada de Ferro Central (1933–57)
- (Brazil) RFFSA (1957–84)
- (Brazil) CBTU Rio de Janeiro (1984–98)
- (Brazil) Supervia
- (Canada) Canadian National Railway
- (Canada) Canadian Pacific Railway
- (South Korea) Korean National Railroad
- (Mexico) Ferromex
- (Mexico) Transportación Ferroviaria
- (Netherlands) ProRail

=== Transit ===
- (United States) Bay Area
- (United States) Chicago
- (United States) Massachusetts Bay
- (United States) Metro Atlanta
- (United States) Niagara Frontier
- (United States) NJ Transit
- (United States) New York City
- (United States) Southeastern Pennsylvania
- (United States) Washington
- (Canada) Toronto
- (Netherlands) Amsterdam Municipal Transport
- (Taiwan) Taipei Rapid Transit Corporation

== Major accomplishments ==
- First Centralized traffic control (cTc) machine, 1927.
- "NX" (eNtrance-eXit) systems (relay-based cTc), 1937.
- First fully automated freight yard, 1955.
- Computer-based central control office, 1968.
- First fully automatic computer-planned and executed train meet, 1981.
- Microprocessor based Interlocking ("Vital Processor Interlocking"), 1986.
- Amtrak Northeast Corridor Improvement Project, 1980s.
- 100th Anniversary, 2004.

== See also ==
- History General Signal Building in Buffalo
- Union Switch and Signal, the other major US railway signaling company.
- North American railroad signals
