= Sinclair, Rooney & Co. Building =

Historic commercial building in New York, United States

- U.S. National Register of Historic Places
- New York State Register of Historic Places
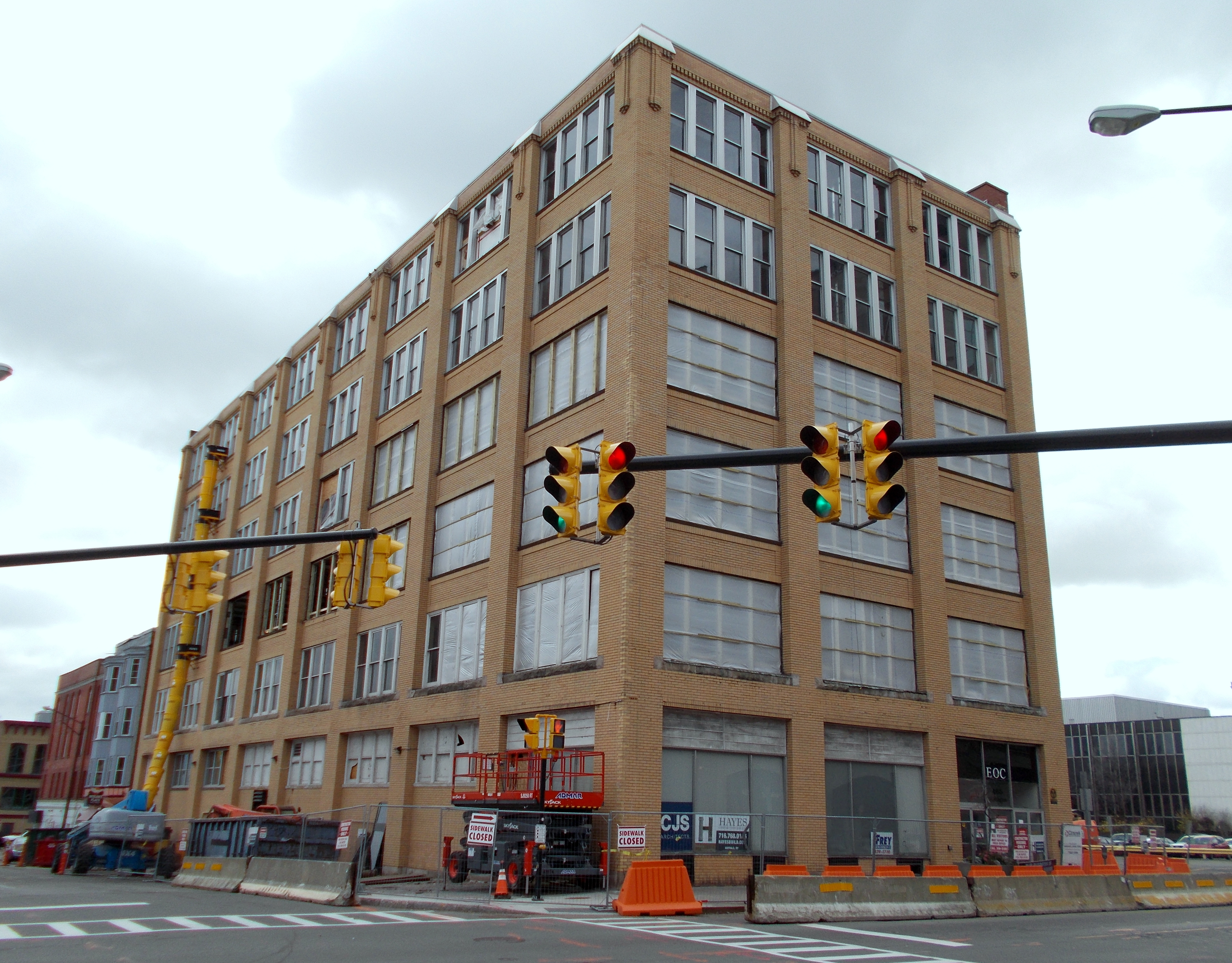
- Sinclair Rooney and Company Building, November 2015

- Location within New York Location within the United States
- Location: 465 Washington St., Buffalo, New York
- Coordinates: 42°53′12″N 78°52′29″W
- Area: 0.27 acres (0.11 ha)
- Built: 1909-1911
- Architects: Esenwein & Johnson
- Architectural style: Commercial Style
- NRHP reference No.: 15001025
- NYSRHP No.: 02940.003047

Significant dates
- Added to NRHP: February 2, 2016
- Designated NYSRHP: December 9, 2015

Sinclair, Rooney & Co. Building, also known as the Remington Rand Building and Sperry-Rand Building, is a historic building located in downtown Buffalo, Erie County, New York. It was designed by the architecture firm Esenwein & Johnson and built between 1909 and 1911. The building is representative of Commercial Style architecture. The six-story, steel frame and concrete, L-shaped building is clad in yellow brick and consists of a rectangular main block, approximately 60-feet by 164-feet, with an extension of approximately 30-feet by 63-feet. It features brick pilasters that extend to the sixth floor, where they are capped by ornamental brick brackets and dentil molding below the roofline. It was built for Sinclair, Rooney, & Co., wholesale milliners, and later occupied by Remington Rand Corporation and its successor Sperry-Rand. The building housed offices and light manufacturing activities.

It was listed on the National Register of Historic Places in 2016.
