= Bancroft Trust Building =

- Dodge Block and Sawyer Building, Bancroft Trust Building
- U.S. National Register of Historic Places
- U.S. Historic district – Contributing property
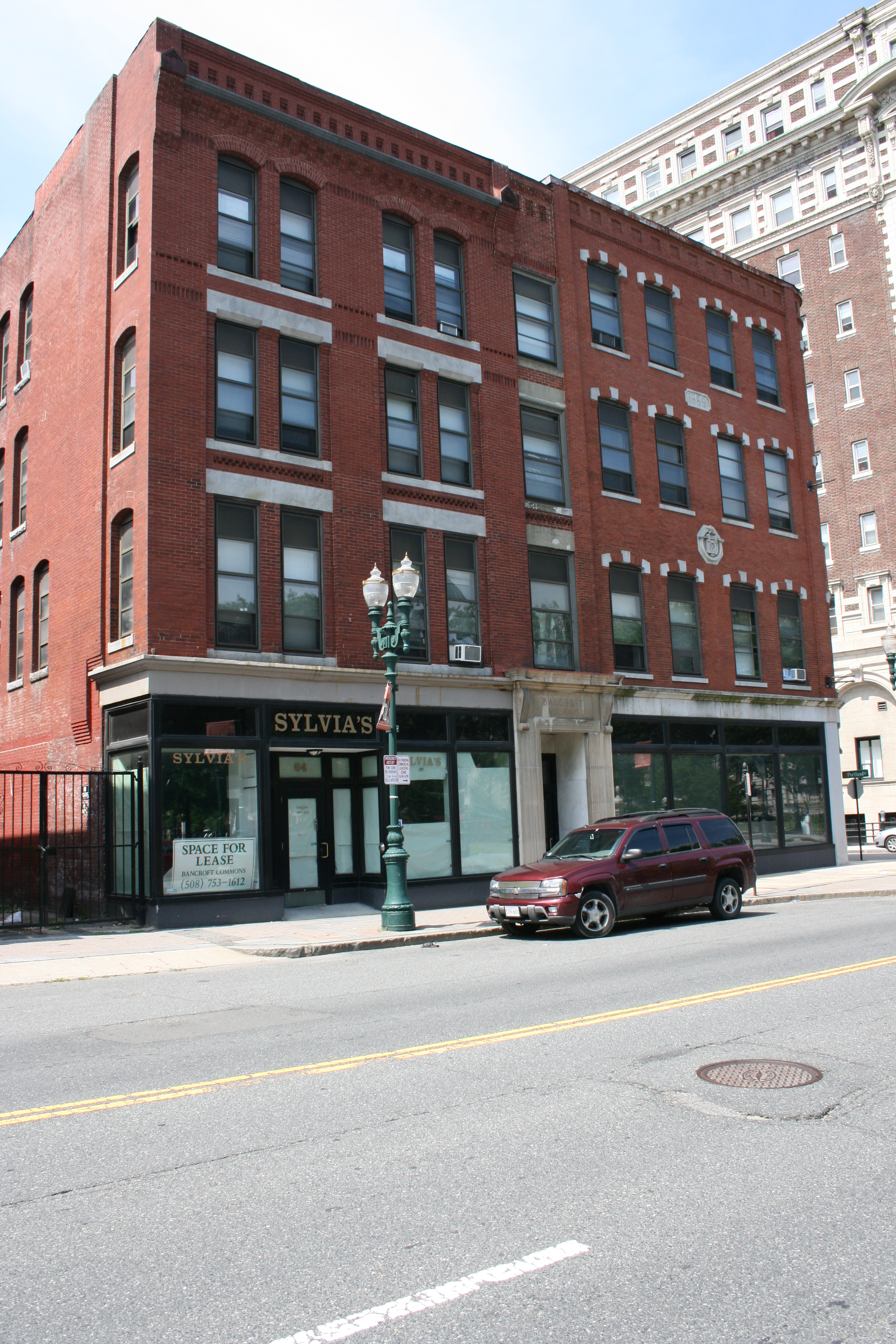

- Location within Massachusetts Location within the United States
- Location: 60 Franklin St., Worcester, Massachusetts
- Coordinates: 42°15′41″N 71°48′6″W
- Built: 1869, 1884, 1920
- Architect: Fuller & Delano
- Architectural style: Late Victorian
- Part of: Main and Franklin Streets Historic District (ID100007732)
- MPS: Worcester MRA
- NRHP reference No.: 02000155

Significant dates
- Added to NRHP: March 15, 2002
- Designated CP: May 27, 2022

The Bancroft Trust Building, formerly the Dodge Block and Sawyer Buildings, is an historic commercial building at 60 Franklin Street in Worcester, Massachusetts. It is the result of combining the 1883 Sawyer Building with the 1869 Dodge Block, one of the few surviving buildings of Worcester's early industrial age. Both buildings were designed by Fuller & Delano of Worcester, and were combined into the Bancroft Trust Building in 1920. It was added to the National Register of Historic Places in 2002.

== Description and history ==
The Bancroft Trust Building is located at the southeast corner of Franklin and Portland Streets in the heart of Worcester, facing the city common. It is a four-story masonry structure, with its heritage as two separate building visible in the different exteriors of the two parts, with a unified presentation of the ground floor consisting of storefronts with large glass display windows set in metal frames, with black panels and a

=== Dodge Block ===
The Dodge Block forms the right side of the building. Its upper floors have windows set in segmented-arch openings, with stone blocks setting of the corners and keystone, and there is a band of rectangular panels above the top floor. The building has a rounded corner with an entrance at the angle. It was built in 1869 for Thomas Dodge, a prominent lawyer and inventor, whose office space occupied much of the second level. Each of the upper floors apparently had a single residential unit, although subsequent alterations to the interior mean its original layout is not known. It was also originally capped by a mansard roof, but it and the fifth floor under it were destroyed in a 1971 fire.

=== Sawyer Building ===
The Sawyer Building forms the left half of the building. It has a stylistically more complex five-bay facade, with a single storefront on the ground floor, and an entrance to the upper floors to its right, near the center of the combined buildings. Above the storefront, windows are grouped in pairs with tall stone lintels and thinner sills. The fourth-floor windows have segmented-arch openings headed by bricks, and there is a band of corbelling above. The entrance is flanked by stone pilasters and topped by a narrow stone portico with scrolled brackets. This building was built in 1882 for Stephen Sawyer, a local businessman who subdivided his house lot to build it. Like the Dodge Block, it was also built for retail space on the ground floor and residential spaces above.

=== Combined ===
By 1920, the Worcester Common had become almost exclusively office and retail space. The two buildings, originally separated by a narrow alleyway, were combined into single structure internally, bound together by filling in the alley with the present entrance bay. It was named after the Bancroft Trust Company, its principal occupant between 1922 and 1936.

== See also ==
- National Register of Historic Places listings in northwestern Worcester, Massachusetts
- National Register of Historic Places listings in Worcester County, Massachusetts
