= The Colonial (Buffalo, New York) =

- Colonial Flats and Annex
- U.S. National Register of Historic Places
- New York State Register of Historic Places
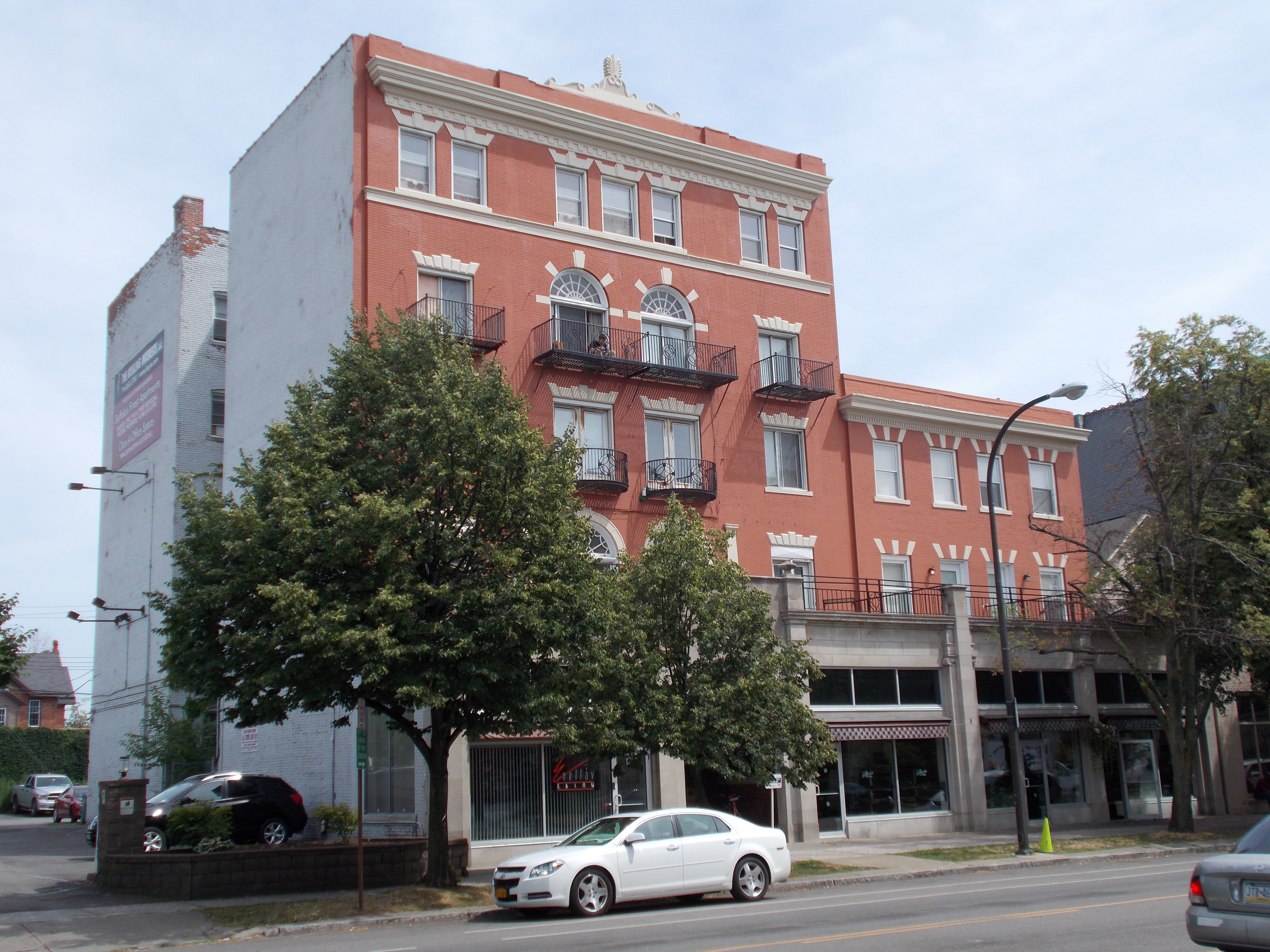
- Colonial Flats and Annex, July 2016

- Location within New York Location within the United States
- Location: 399-401 Delaware Ave., Buffalo, New York
- Coordinates: 42°53′43″N 78°52′30″W
- Area: .172 acres (0.070 ha)
- Built: 1896, 1900, 1926
- Architects: Boughton & Johnson (The Flats), Esenwein & Johnson ("Annex")
- Architectural style: Colonial Revival
- NRHP reference No.: 100002366
- NYSRHP No.: 02940.000647

Significant dates
- Added to NRHP: April 30, 2018
- Designated NYSRHP: March 7, 2008

Colonial Flats and Annex, also known as The Colonial Apartments, is a historic apartment building located in the Allentown neighborhood of Buffalo, Erie County, New York, United States. The building consists of three components: the 1896 five-story, brick "Flats" to the north; the 1900 three-story brick "Annex" at the south end, and a 1926 single-story precast concrete commercial storefront that unites the Flats and Annex along Delaware Avenue. The Flats and Annex are internally connected and share a similar Colonial Revival style.

It was listed on the National Register of Historic Places in 2018.
