= Automobile Club of Buffalo =

- U.S. National Register of Historic Places
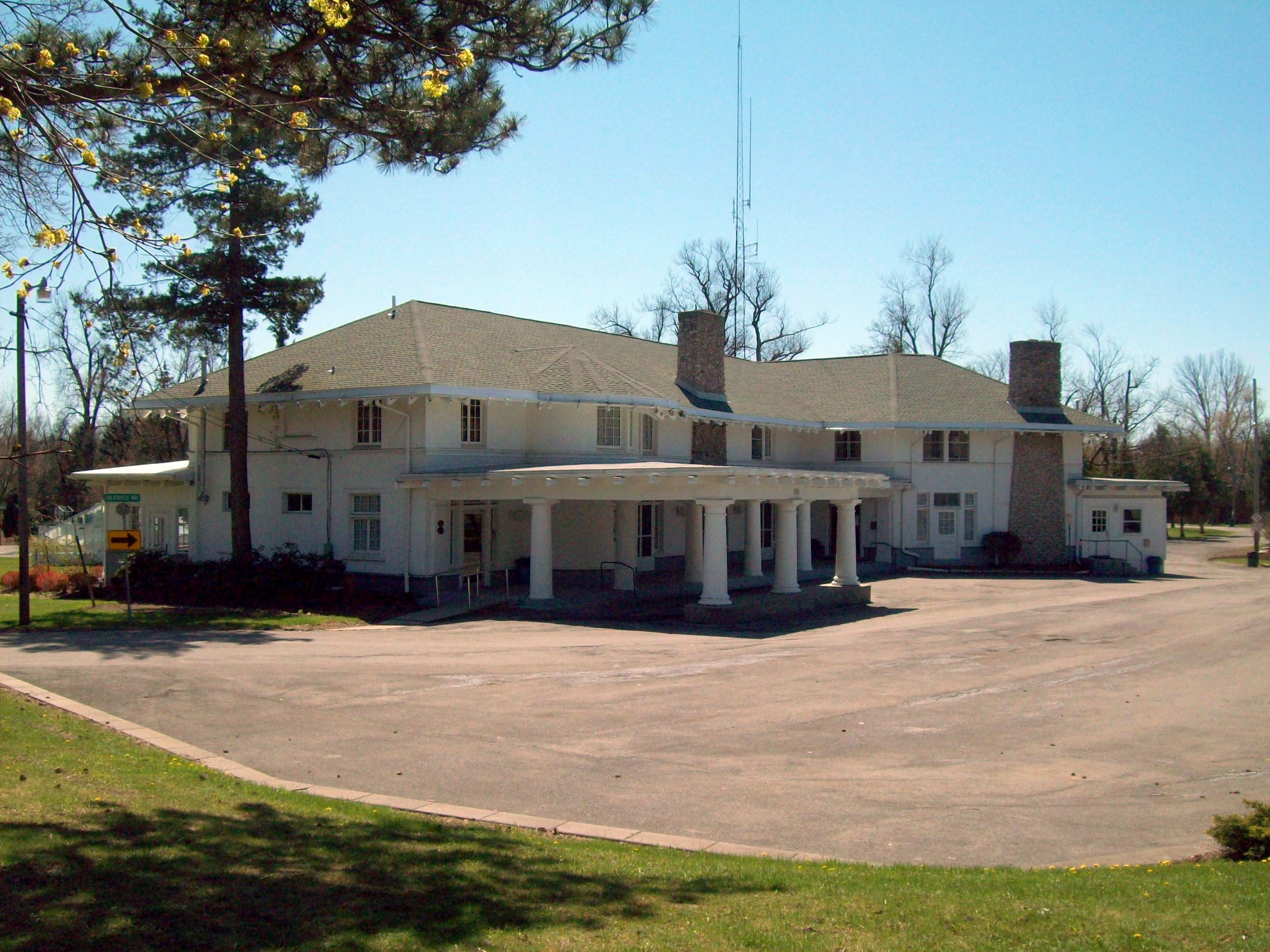
- Automobile Club of Buffalo, April 2012

- Location within New York Location within the United States
- Location: 10405 Main Street, Clarence, New York
- Coordinates: 42°58′47″N 78°35′56″W
- Area: 32.93 acres (13.33 ha)
- Built: 1910-1911
- Built by: Metz Brothers Construction Co.
- Architect: Esenwein & Johnson
- Architectural style: Craftsman
- NRHP reference No.: 12000341
- Added to NRHP: June 20, 2012

Automobile Club of Buffalo is a historic clubhouse located at Clarence in Erie County, New York. It was designed by the architectural firm of Esenwein & Johnson and built in 1910–1911 in the Craftsman style. It is a two-story, Y-shaped, wood-frame building with a low hipped roof and broad eaves. The building measures 184 feet long and 32 feet wide. It features a deep porte cochere, semicircular two-story tower, broad verandah, enclosed one-story porch, and two exposed chimneys. Also on the property is a contributing storage shed. The property was sold to the Town of Clarence in 1957, and is used as a town park. The Automobile Club of Buffalo joined the American Automobile Association in 1903, one of its earliest affiliates. The clubhouse was built to promote membership in the Automobile Club of Buffalo, and was one of only six country clubs built by similar organizations in the United States.

It was added to the National Register of Historic Places in 2012.
