= Main and Franklin Streets Historic District =

Historic district in Massachusetts, United States

- Main and Franklin Streets District
- U.S. National Register of Historic Places
- U.S. Historic district
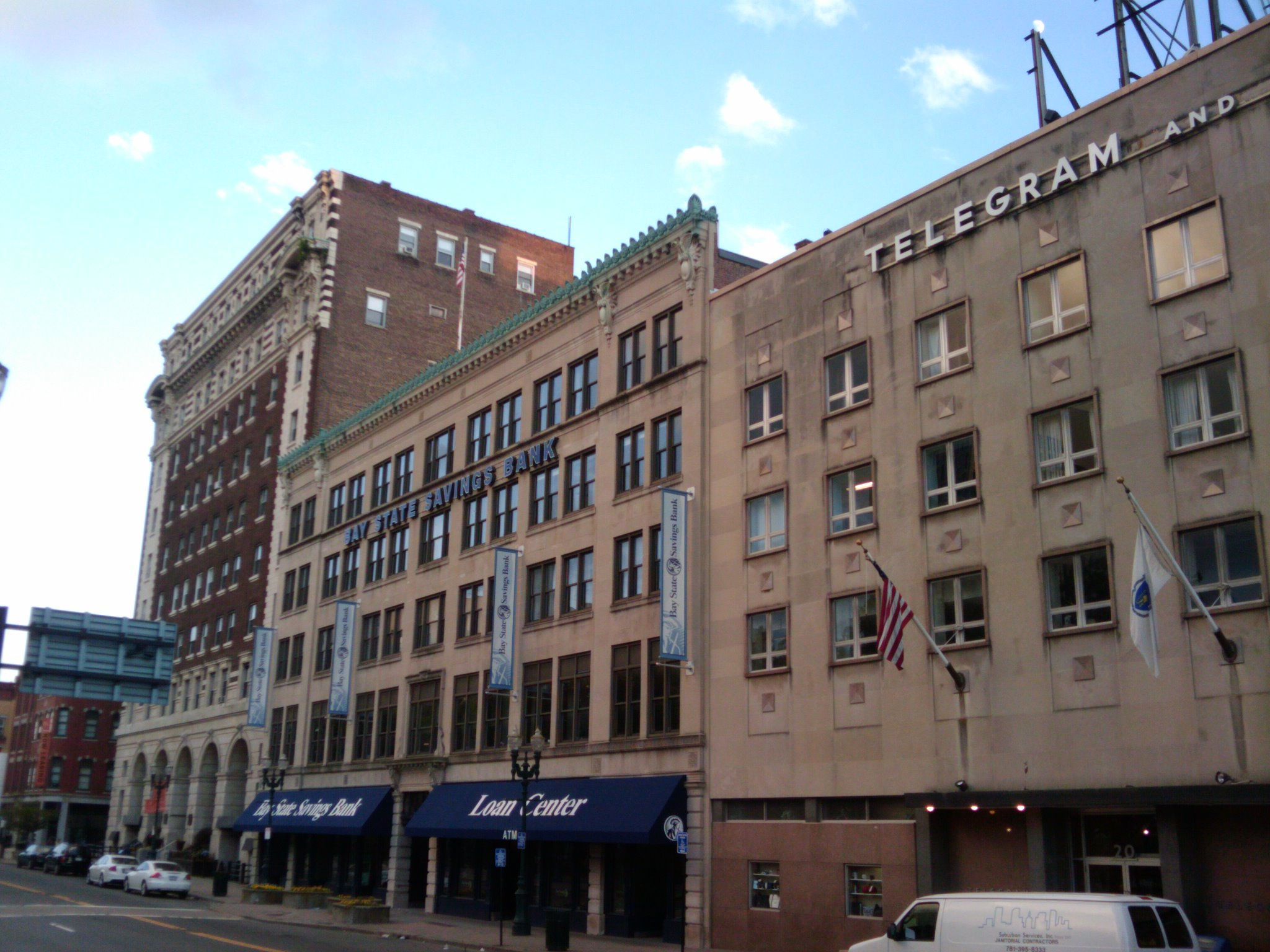
- Franklin Street view

- Location within Massachusetts Location within the United States
- Location: Roughly bounded by Main, Franklin, Federal, Salem, and Portland Sts., Worcester, Massachusetts
- Coordinates: 42°15′40″N 71°48′5″W
- Area: 4 acres (1.6 ha)
- Built: c. 1870
- Architect: Fuller & Delano and others
- Architectural style: Second Empire, Queen Anne, Classical Revival, Romanesque
- NRHP reference No.: 100007732
- Added to NRHP: May 27, 2022

The Main and Franklin Streets Historic District is an historic district encompassing most of two city blocks in downtown Worcester, Massachusetts. Roughly bounded by Main, Franklin, Federal, Portland, and Salem Streets, the district includes a well-preserved concentration of commercial buildings constructed during Worcester's economic height in the late 19th and early 20th centuries. The district was listed on the National Register of Historic Places in 2022.

== Description and history ==
The Main and Franklin Streets Historic District is located directly south of Worcester City Hall and Common in the heart of downtown Worcester. It includes all of the buildings in the square block bounded by Main, Franklin, Federal, and Portland Streets, and most of the adjacent buildings in the block directly to the east, bounded by Franklin, Portland, and Salem Streets, and a linear continuation of Federal Street. The most prominent buildings line Franklin Street and face the common; these include the Park Building, Bancroft Hotel, Bancroft Trust Building (all individually listed on the National Register), and the former premises of the Worcester Telegram & Gazette.

Although Worcester's Main Street had seen significant commercial development into the mid-19th century, the Franklin Street stretch facing the common was still largely residential in 1870. Over the next 60 years the area was completely transformed into the densely built commercial district it is today. This was due in part to a railroad spur, which served to separate the areas. In the 1890s, the railroad facilities were removed, and the largest commercial buildings, the luxury Bancroft Hotel and the Park Building, were built between 1910 and 1914.

== See also ==
- National Register of Historic Places listings in northwestern Worcester, Massachusetts
- National Register of Historic Places listings in Worcester County, Massachusetts
