= Esenwein & Johnson =

- Type: Private company
- Industry: Architecture
- Founded: 1898
- Founder: August Esenwein; James A. Johnson
- Defunct: c. 1930
- Headquarters: Buffalo, New York

Esenwein & Johnson was an architectural firm of Buffalo, New York.

== Firm history ==
It was a partnership of German-born August Esenwein (1856-1926) and James A. Johnson (1865-1939). The partnership was started in 1898; the firm designed "many of Buffalo's outstanding buildings including the Lafayette High School and the General Electric Building".

A number of their works are listed on the U.S. National Register of Historic Places. In 2007, the Buffalo History Museum, then called the Buffalo and Erie County Historical Society, held an exhibition of their work entitled, "Art Nouveau and Other Expressions: Rediscovering the Architecture of Esenwein & Johnson."

== Works ==
Works include (with attribution):

- Ansonia Building (1906), 712-726 Main Street (at W. Tupper), Buffalo, New York (Esenwein & Johnson)
- Automobile Club of Buffalo, 1910-1911, Clarence, New York (Esenwein & Johnson), NRHP-listed
- Bancroft Hotel, built 1912, 50 Franklin St. Worcester, Massachusetts (Esenwein & Johnson), NRHP-listed
- Buffalo Museum of Science, built in 1929, (Esenwein & Johnson)
- The Calumet (1906), 46-58 West Chippewa St., Buffalo, New York (Esenwein & Johnson), NRHP-listed
- Colonial Flats and Annex, 399-401 Delaware Ave., Buffalo, New York. Designed the "Annex" (1900), (Esenwein & Johnson), NRHP-listed.
- Dnipro Ukrainian Cultural Center, originally Fraternal Order of Orioles Headquarters (1914), 562 Genesee St., Buffalo New York (Esenwein & Johnson)
- The Durant, 607 E. 2nd Ave. Flint, Michigan (Esenwein & Johnson), NRHP-listed
- Hotel Utica in Utica, New York
- Iroquois Hotel, Buffalo in Buffalo, New York, Built 1889 and demolished in 1940 (known as the Gerrans Building at that time) to make way of Bond Clothing Company Building (1940-1964) and now site of One M&T Plaza
- Fosdick-Masten Park High School, aka Masten Park High School (1914), Masten Ave. and E. North St., Buffalo, New York (Esenwein & Johnson), NRHP-listed
- General Electric Tower, aka Niagara-Mohawk Building and Electric Tower, 535 Washington St., Buffalo, New York (Esenwein & Johnson), NRHP-listed
- Louis Kurtzman House (1907-1909), 24 Lincoln Parkway, Buffalo, New York (Esenwein & Johnson)
- Lafayette High School, 370 Lafayette Ave., Buffalo, New York (Esenwein & Johnson), NRHP-listed
- Hotel Lafayette (1902), 391 Washington St., Buffalo, New York (Esenwein & Johnson), NRHP-listed
- Linde Air Products Factory (1910, 1911 Additions), 155 Chandler St., Buffalo, New York (Esenwein & Johnson), NRHP-listed
- The Niagara, 201 Rainbow Blvd. Niagara Falls, New York (Esenwein and Johnson of Buffalo, NY), NRHP-listed
- Portage Hotel, 10 N. Main St. Akron, Ohio (Esenwein & Johnson), NRHP-listed
- Robert Keating Root Building (1912), 70-86 West Chippewa Street, Buffalo, New York (Esenwein & Johnson)
- Royal Connaught Hotel (1916) 118 King Street East Hamilton, Ontario
- Sinclair, Rooney & Co. Building (1909-1911), 465 Washington St., Buffalo, New York, NRHP listed
- John Sinclair House (1909-1911), 94 Jewett Parkway, Buffalo, New York (Esenwein & Johnson), part of the NRHP-listed Parkside East Historic District
- Hotel Statler (original, c. 1908), Buffalo, New York (Esenwein & Johnson)
- Taylor Signal Company-General Railway Signal Company (1902-1906), Buffalo, New York (Esenwein & Johnson)
- Temple of Music (1901), Buffalo, New York (Esenwein & Johnson)
- United Office Building (1929), 222 1st Street, Niagara Falls, New York (James A. Johnson), NRHP-listed
- M. Wile and Company Factory Building, 77 Goodell St., Buffalo, New York (Esenwein & Johnson), NRHP-listed

A more complete list of works is found on the Buffalo Architecture and History web site.

== Gallery ==
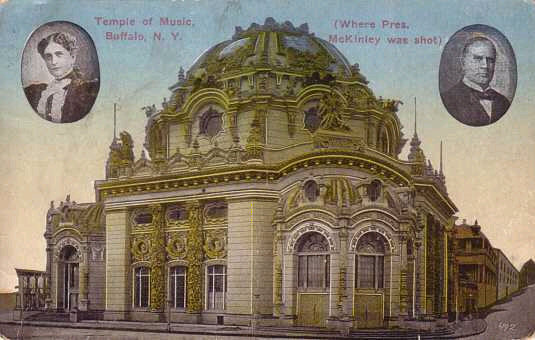
Temple of Music (where President William McKinley was assassinated)

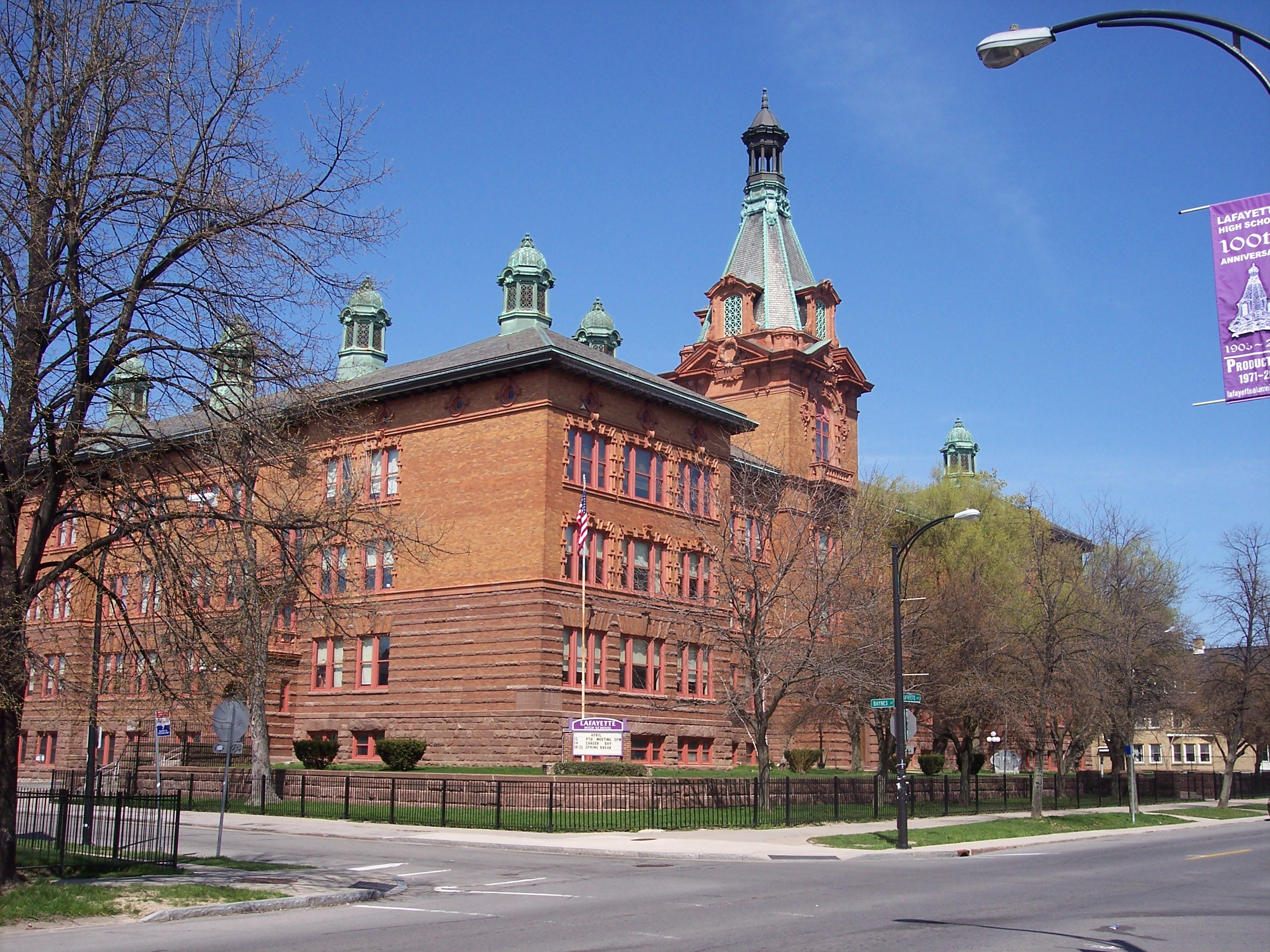
Lafayette High School

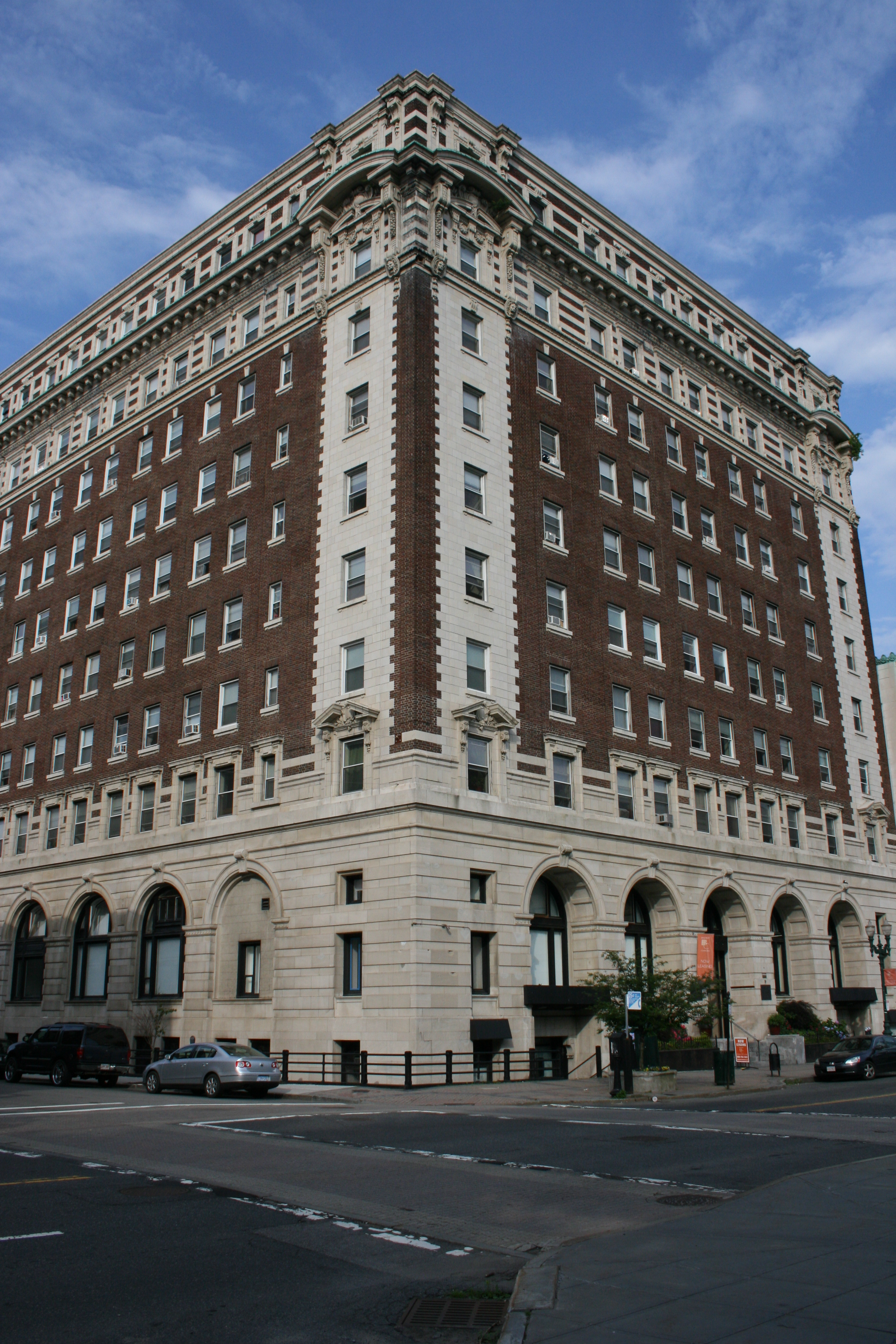
Bancroft Hotel

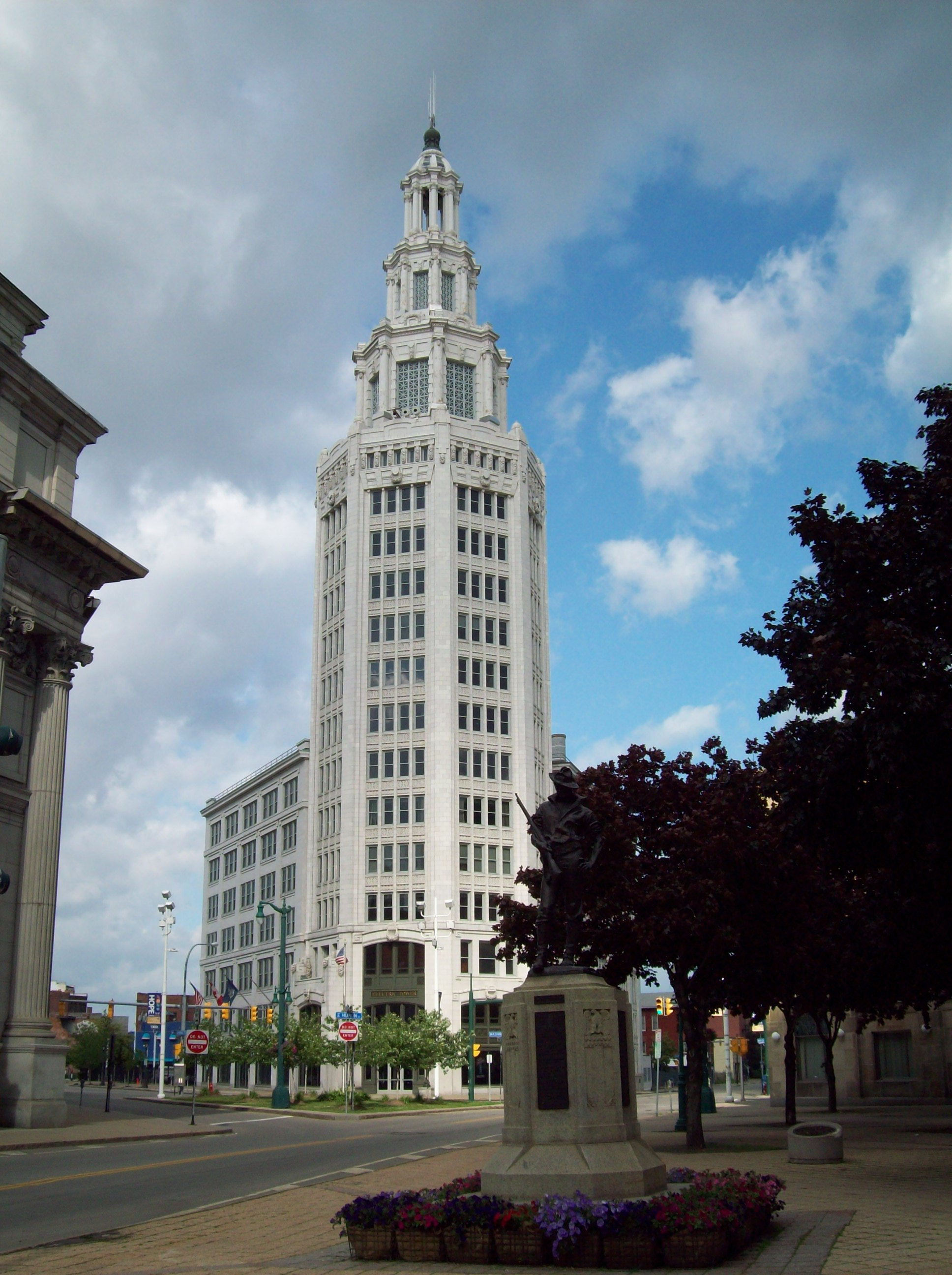
General Electric Tower

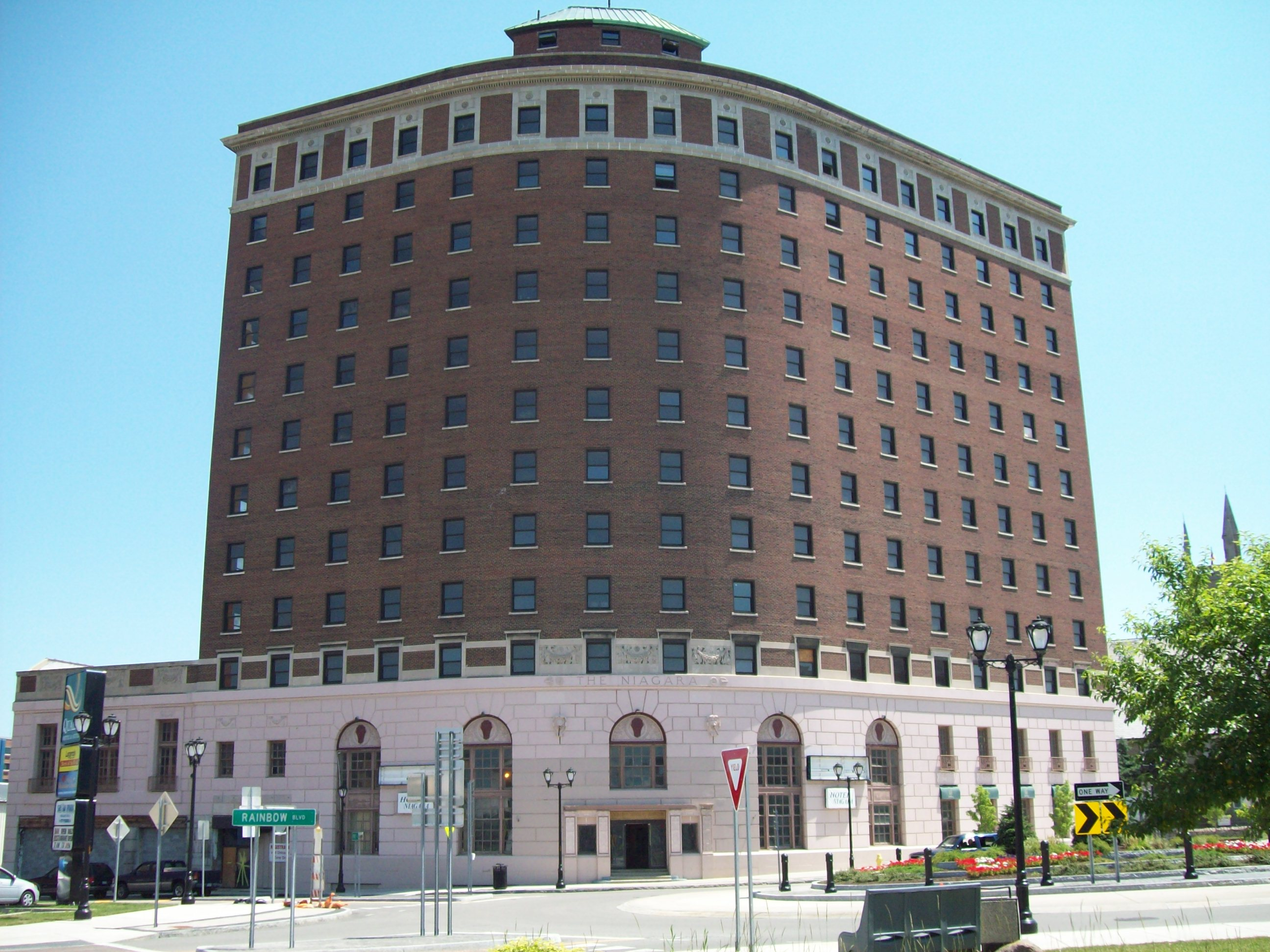
Grand Hotel Niagara

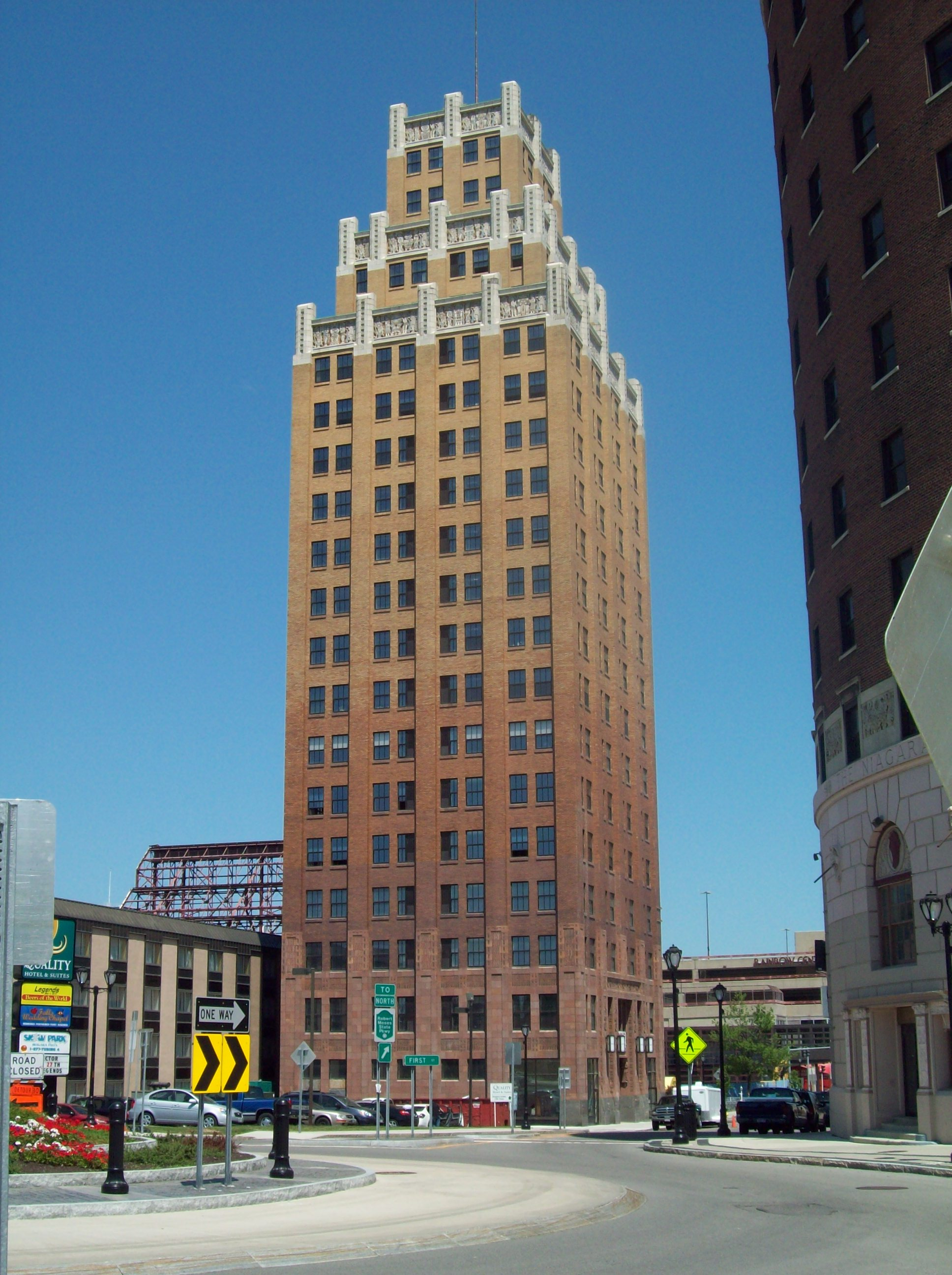
United Office Building

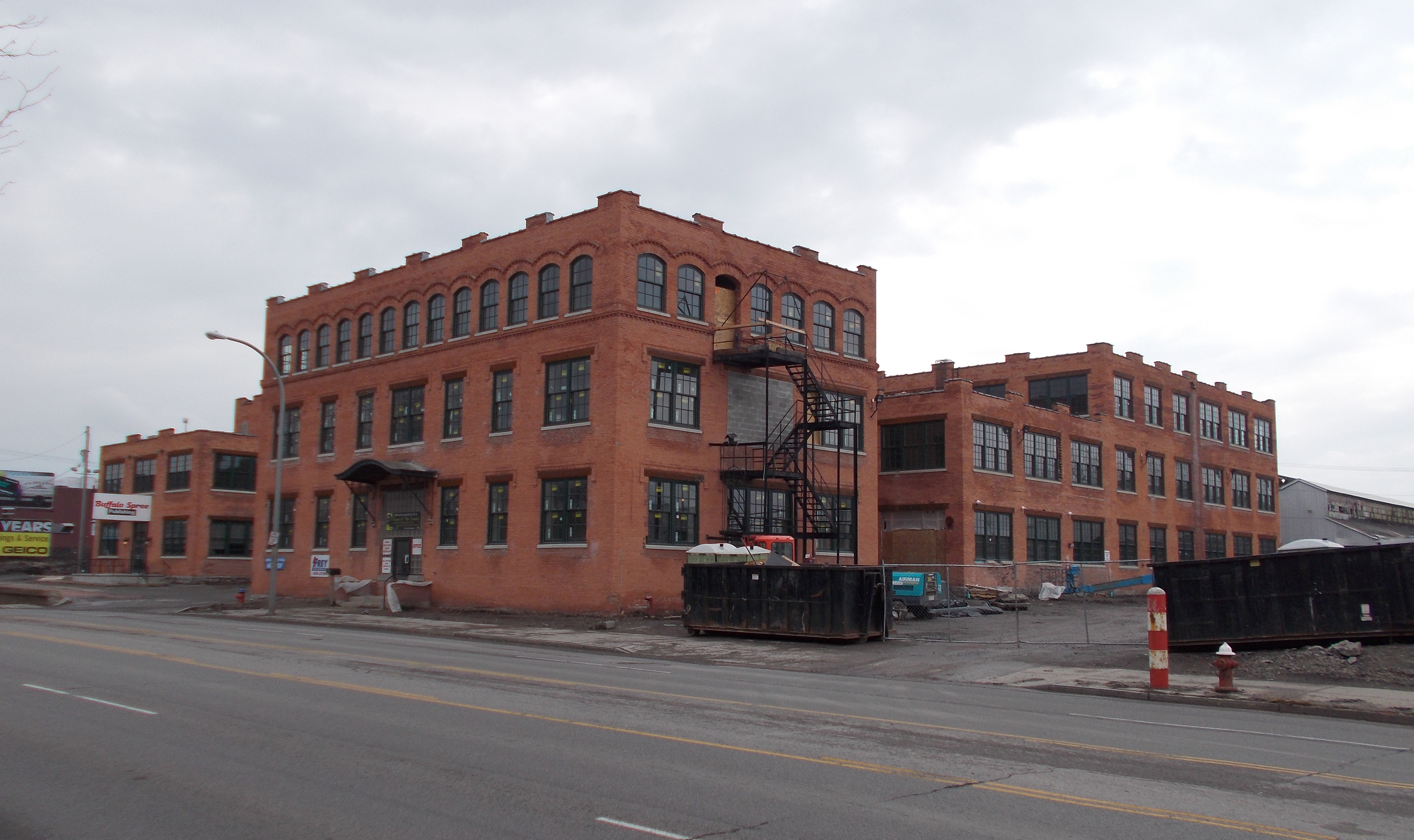
Taylor Signal Company-General Railway Signal Company

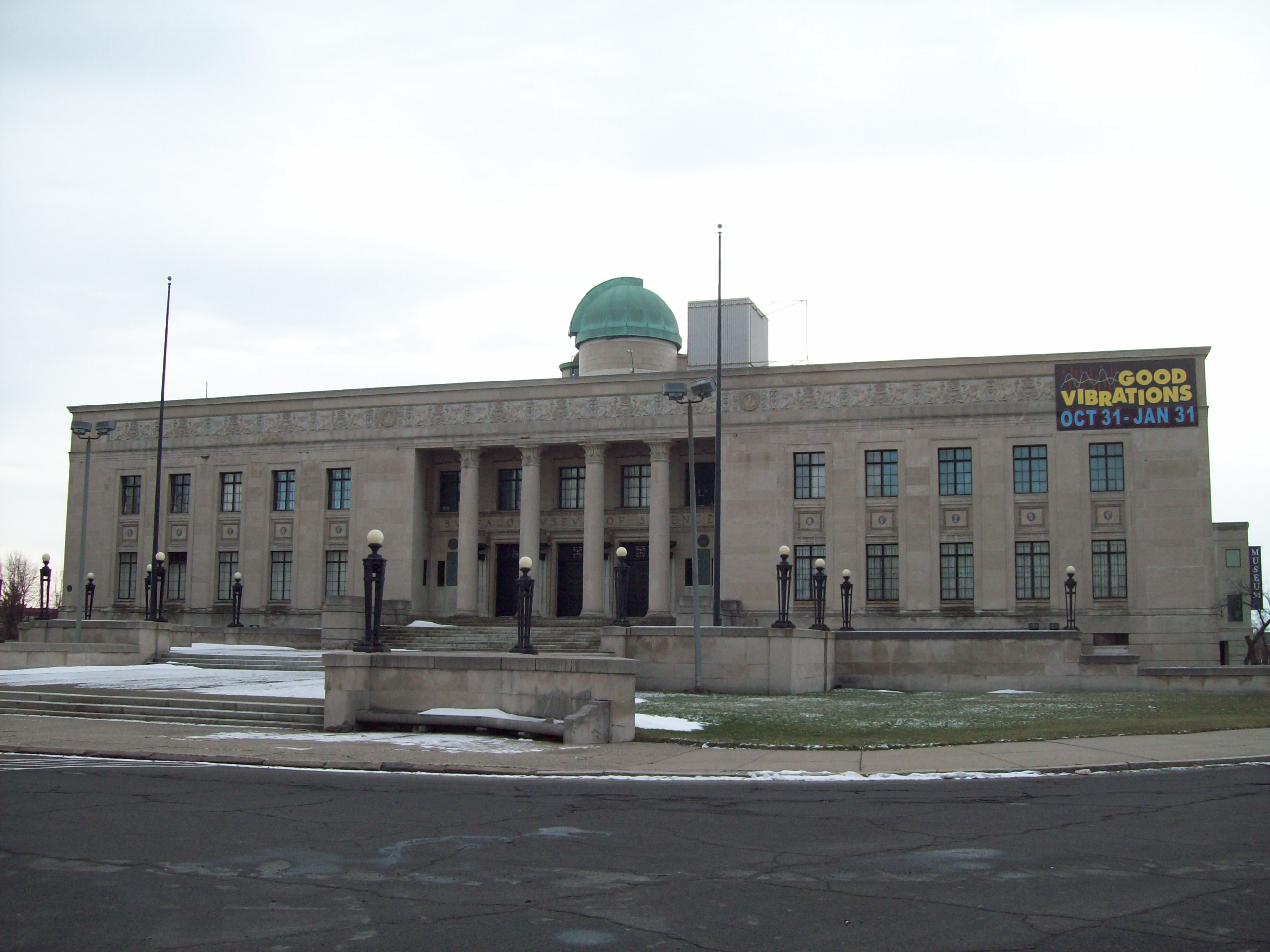
Buffalo Museum of Science

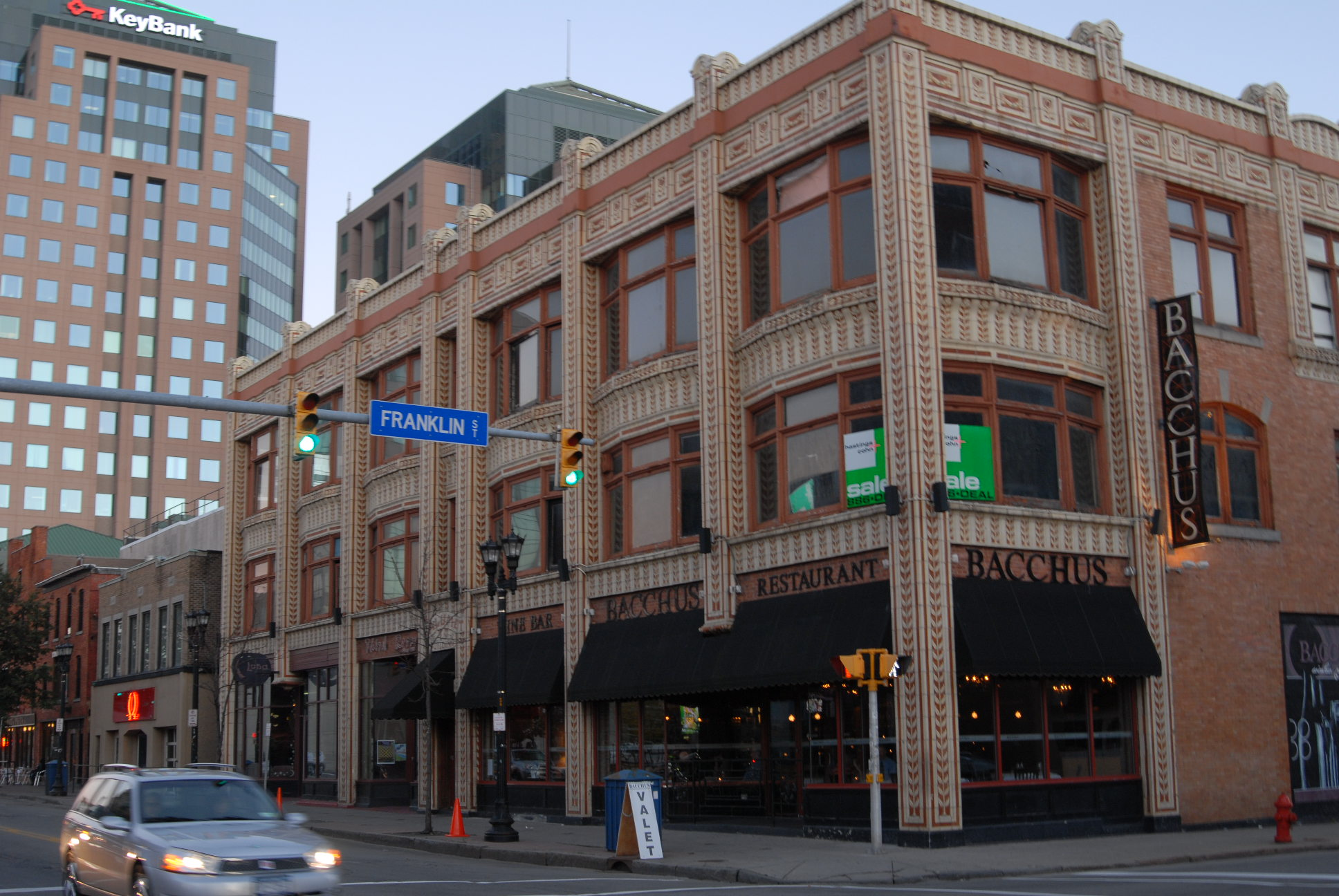
The Calumet

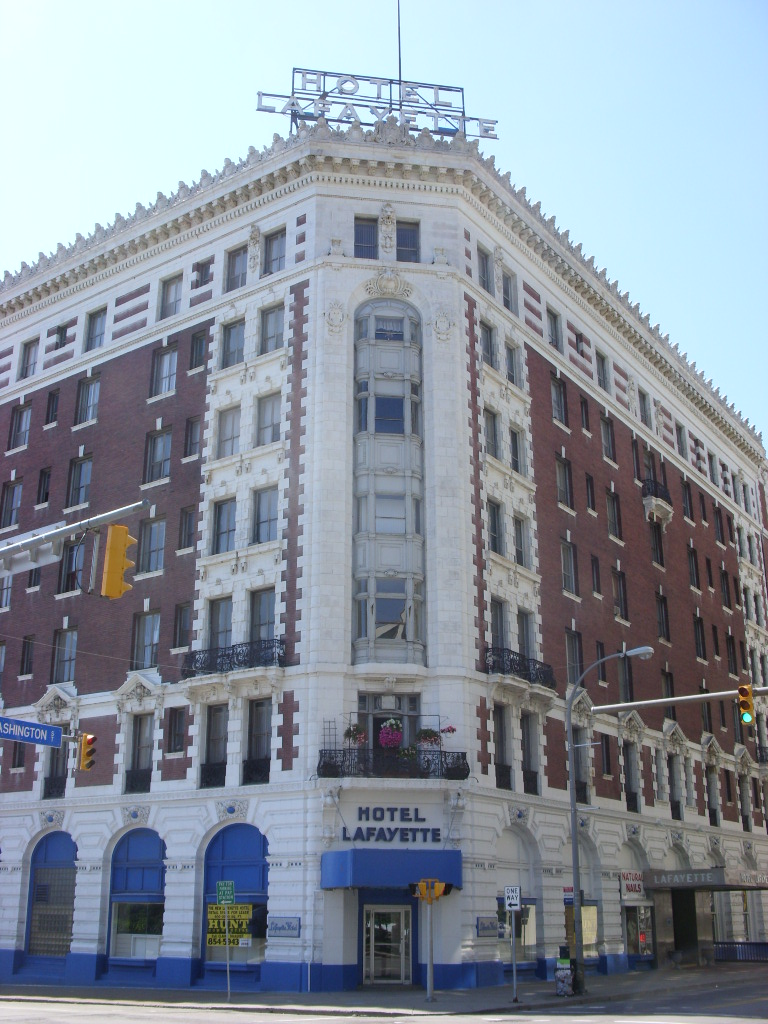
Hotel Lafayette

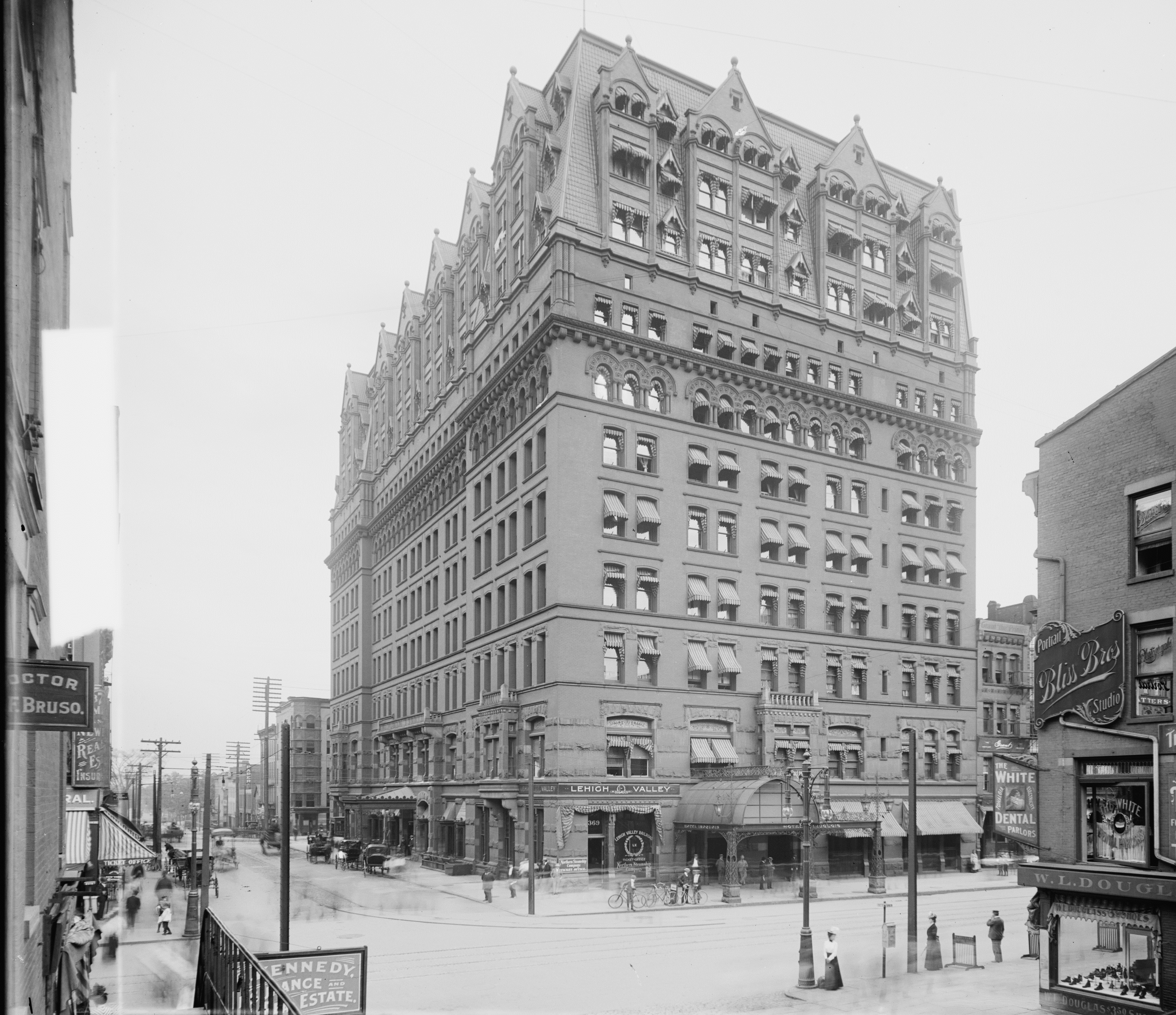
Iroquois Hotel

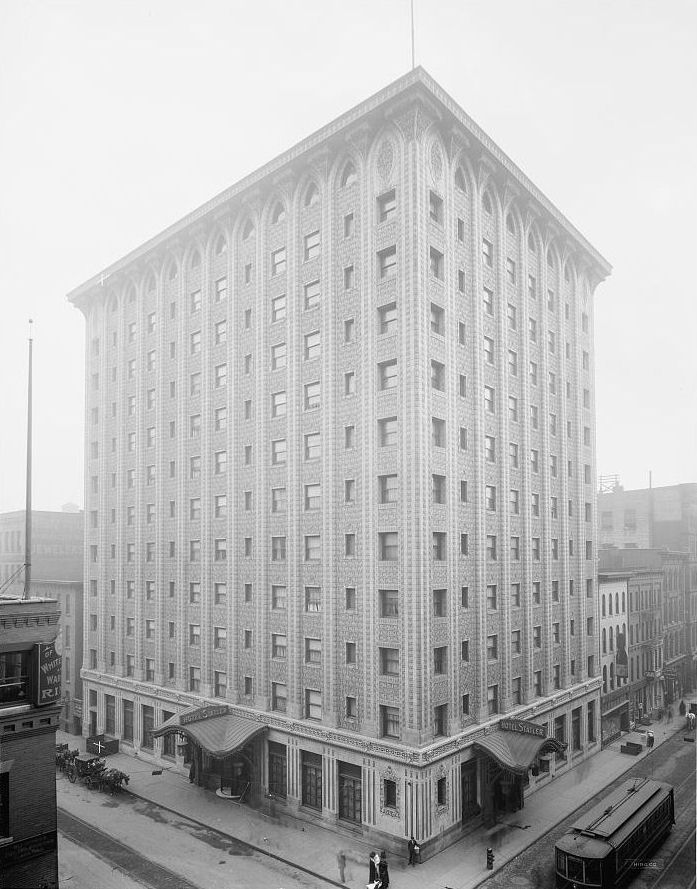
Hotel Statler (original)
