= Federal Signal Company =

American manufacturer of railway signaling equipment

The Federal Signal Company was an American manufacturer of railway signaling equipment in the early 20th century. It was located in Albany, New York.

The company had been founded in 1905 as the Federal Railway Signal Company by former employees of the Standard Signal Company (Arlington, New Jersey). It established a manufacturing works at Green Island, New York, near Albany. In January 1907 the company suffered a devastating fire at the factory, which had employed between 700 and 800 workers. After the fire it purchased land in Albany to build a new plant.

The company subsequently experienced financial problems and was reorganized as the Federal Signal Co. in 1908. In 1913 Federal Signal acquired the American Railway Signal Company of Cleveland.

In 1923 Federal Signal was purchased by General Railway Signal (GRS). Following the acquisition, GRS consolidated manufacturing operations at its facilities in Rochester, New York, and vacated the Albany works. GRS was acquired by Alstom in 1998.

== See also ==
- North American railroad signals
