= Park Building (Worcester, Massachusetts) =

- U.S. National Register of Historic Places
- U.S. Historic district – Contributing property
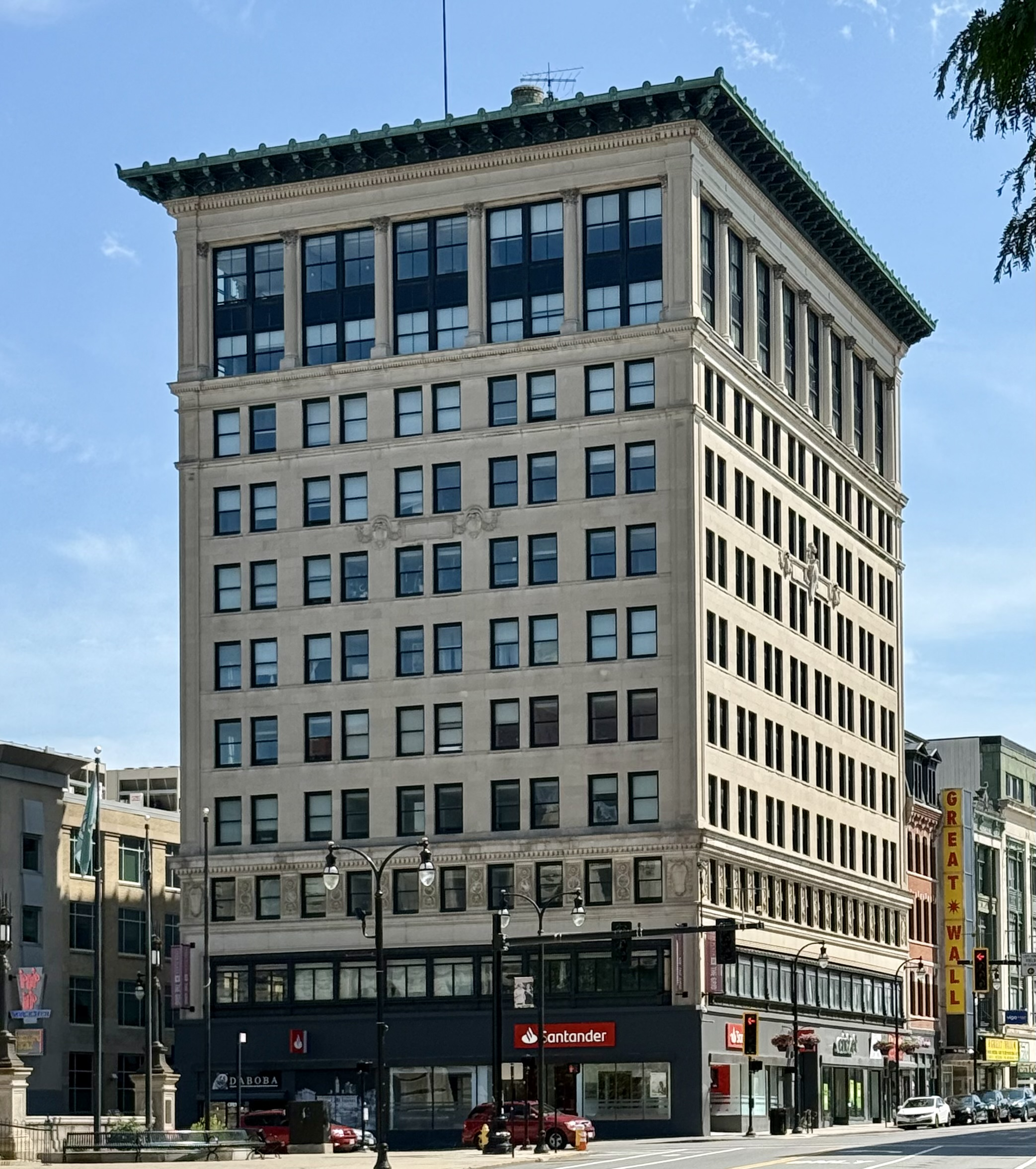
- The Park Building in 2025.

- Location within Massachusetts Location within the United States
- Location: 507 Main Street; Worcester, Massachusetts
- Coordinates: 42°15′43″N 71°48′11″W
- Built: 1914
- Architect: Cross and Cross; D. H. Burnham
- Architectural style: Classical Revival
- Part of: Main and Franklin Streets Historic District (ID100007732)
- MPS: Worcester MRA
- NRHP reference No.: 80000607

Significant dates
- Added to NRHP: March 5, 1980
- Designated CP: May 27, 2022

The Park Building is an historic building in Worcester, Massachusetts, USA. Built in 1914, the 11 story structure was for many years one of Worcester's most prominent landmarks. It has a steel frame, with an exterior that is dressed predominantly in limestone. The first two floors have metal and plate glass store fronts, while the third floor has evenly spaced windows, separated by decorative limestone panels and topped by a cornice. From the fourth to the ninth floors there is little decoration. The top two floors have groups of windows separated by Tuscan columns, giving the appearance of a loggia.

The building was listed on the National Register of Historic Places in 1980. As of 2016 it is an apartment building known as Park Plaza that is part of the Grid District, a commercial urban redevelopment project in downtown Worcester.

== See also ==
- National Register of Historic Places listings in northwestern Worcester, Massachusetts
- National Register of Historic Places listings in Worcester County, Massachusetts
