= Fosdick-Masten Park High School =

- U.S. National Register of Historic Places
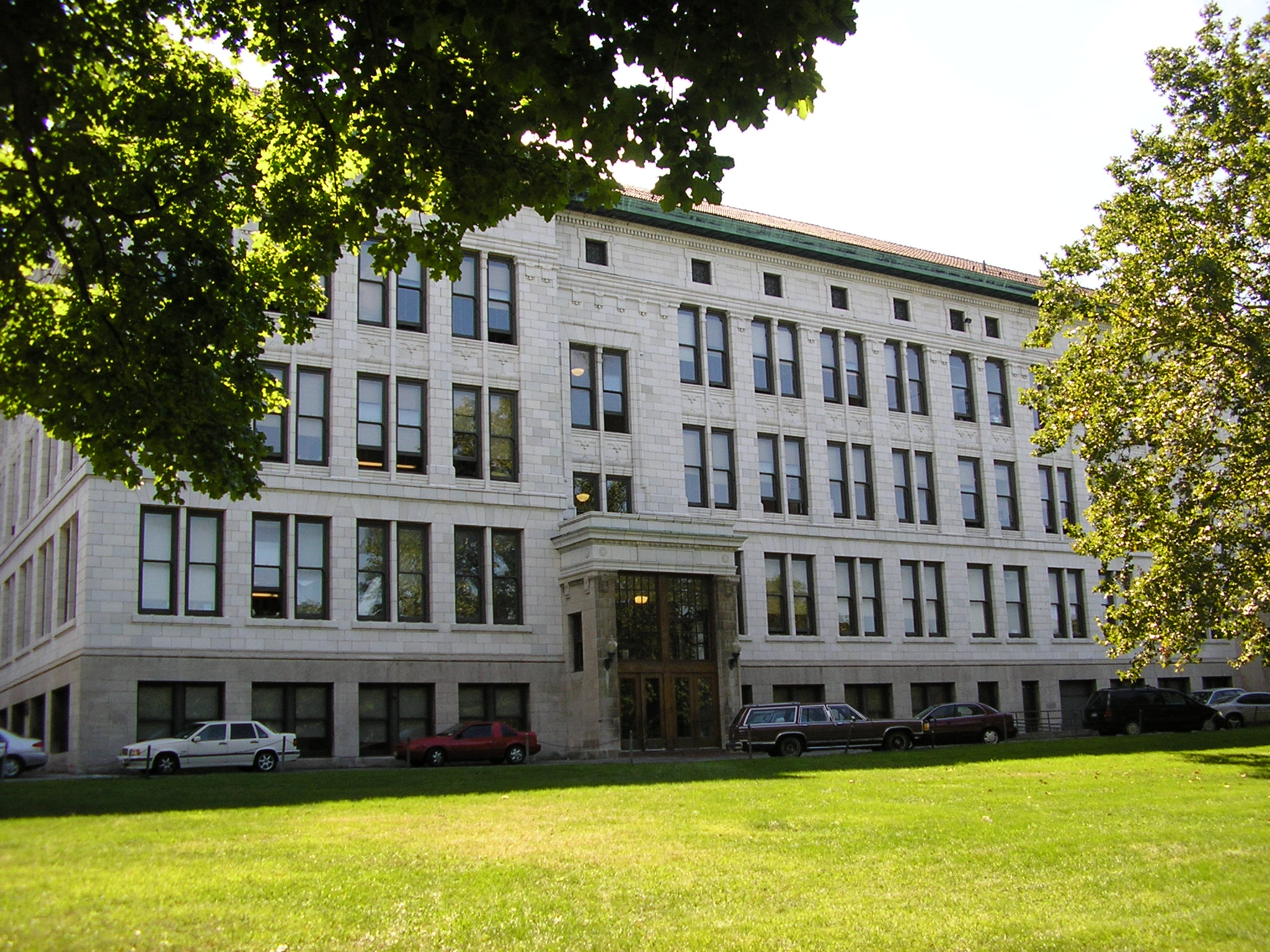
- City Honors School as viewed from Best Street, June 2006

- Location within New York Location within the United States
- Location: Masten Ave. and E. North St., Buffalo, New York
- Coordinates: 42°54′11″N 78°51′38″W
- Built: 1912-1914
- Architect: Esenwein & Johnson
- Architectural style: Beaux Arts, Beaux Arts Classicism
- NRHP reference No.: 83001672
- Added to NRHP: June 30, 1983

Fosdick-Masten Park High School, now known as City Honors School, is a historic public high school building located at Buffalo in Erie County, New York. The school is located on a 5.2-acre (2.1 ha) site. It was designed by architects Esenwein & Johnson and is a 3 1/2-story H-shaped brick structure constructed in 1912–1914 and sheathed in white glazed terra cotta tile.

It was added to the National Register of Historic Places in 1983.

== Notable alumni ==
- Frankie Pytlak, former Major League Baseball catcher
- John Wyatt, former Major League Baseball pitcher
- Lucille Clifton, African American writer and poet
- Eddie Malanowicz, former basketball player and coach

== In popular culture ==
A cartoon sketch of (then) Masten Park High School appears on the 1938 Goudey baseball card #269 of alumnus Frankie Pytlak.
