= Dnipro Ukrainian Cultural Center =

Coordinates: 42.895670°N 78.855486°W

The Dnipro Ukrainian Cultural Center is a civic and social club located at 562 Genesee Street in Buffalo, New York.

== History ==
Dnipro was built in 1914, designed by the Buffalo architect duo of August Esenwein and James Johnson. Originally constructed to be the headquarters of the Fraternal Order Orioles, the building was purchased by the Ukrainian Americans community from the City of Buffalo in 1955. It was founded by immigrants that came to America as they had been displaced by World War II.

Dnipro was naturally named after the largest river in Ukraine, which flows past the capital of Kyiv south to Odesa, and splashes into the Black Sea. At Dnipro, the Ukrainian community of Buffalo sought to establish a center where Ukrainians could socialize, maintain their cultural identity, pass their heritage onto their children, and organize political structures that would promote its independence from the USSR, and now protect its sovereignty. Hundreds of life changing events have been hosted at Dnipro, such as weddings, musical concerts, theater, movie recordings, dance recitals, birthday celebrations, christenings, and anniversaries. Dnipro hosts annual events like "Malanka" New Years ballroom dance, and the Ukrainian Independence Day Festival in August.

Dnipro is the home of the Ukrainian Federal Credit Union, Buffalo branch, which serves its members in Ukrainian, English, Russian and Polish six days of the week, every week since 1995. Since 2013, Dnipro has provided "Ridna Shkola" Ukrainian Saturday School with five classrooms, and has hosted its biannual performances at the second floor "Velika Zalya" Great Hall. Ukrainian American Youth Association "CYM" and women's choir "Mriya" meet at Dnipro regularly.

In 2014, the building turned 100 years old, and in 2015, Ukrainians celebrated their 60th year of its ownership. Dnipro is a part of the Ukrainian American Freedom Foundation, which is an IRS recognized “article 501(c)3 charitable organization”.
