= Bancroft Hotel =

- U.S. National Register of Historic Places
- U.S. Historic district – Contributing property
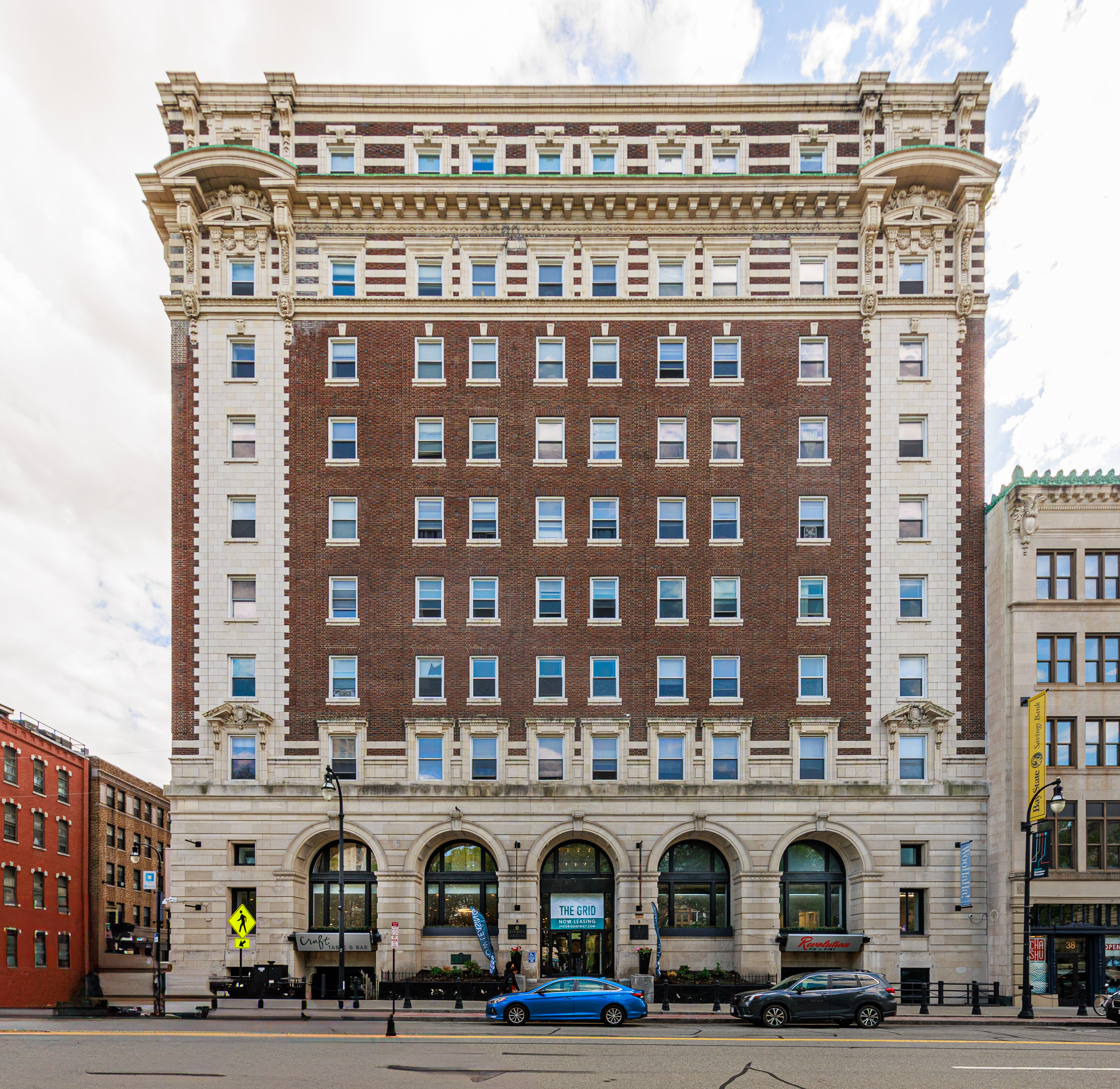
- Franklin Street façade
- Location: 50 Franklin Street, Worcester, Massachusetts
- Coordinates: 42°15′41″N 71°48′6″W
- Built: 1913
- Architect: Esenwein & Johnson
- Architectural style: Beaux Arts
- Part of: Main and Franklin Streets Historic District (ID100007732)
- MPS: Worcester MRA
- NRHP reference No.: 80000614

Significant dates
- Expanded: 1925
- Converted: 1964
- Added to NRHP: March 5, 1980
- Designated CP: May 27, 2022

The Bancroft Hotel is a historic hotel building at 50 Franklin Street in Worcester, Massachusetts. Opened in 1913 and expanded in 1929, it is one of the city's finest examples of Beaux Arts architecture, and was for many years its finest and most opulent hotel. It was listed on the National Register of Historic Places in 1980. It has since been converted into luxury residences, and is called Bancroft on the Grid.

== Description ==
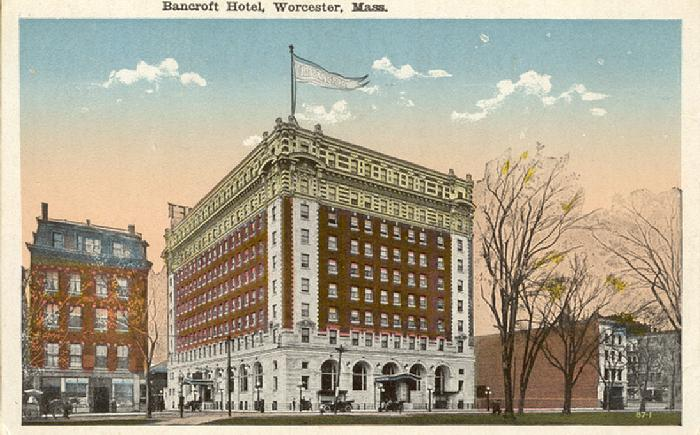
The Hotel Bancroft as built, prior to extension

The former Bancroft Hotel is located in downtown Worcester, on the south side of Franklin Street, facing the Worcester Common and City Hall to the north. It is a ten-story structure, with a steel frame faced in brick, terracotta, and stone. The ground floor presents an arcade of arches to both Franklin and Portland Streets, finished in marble. The second floor is a band of sash windows with elaborate terra cotta surrounds. The next five floors are uniform, with sash windows in rectangular openings. The bays at the corners are finished in light-colored stone, a contrast to the darker brick of the other bays. The eighth floor once again has more elaborate window treatments, and a detailed cornice separates it from the ninth, which is also crowned by a projecting cornice.

== History ==
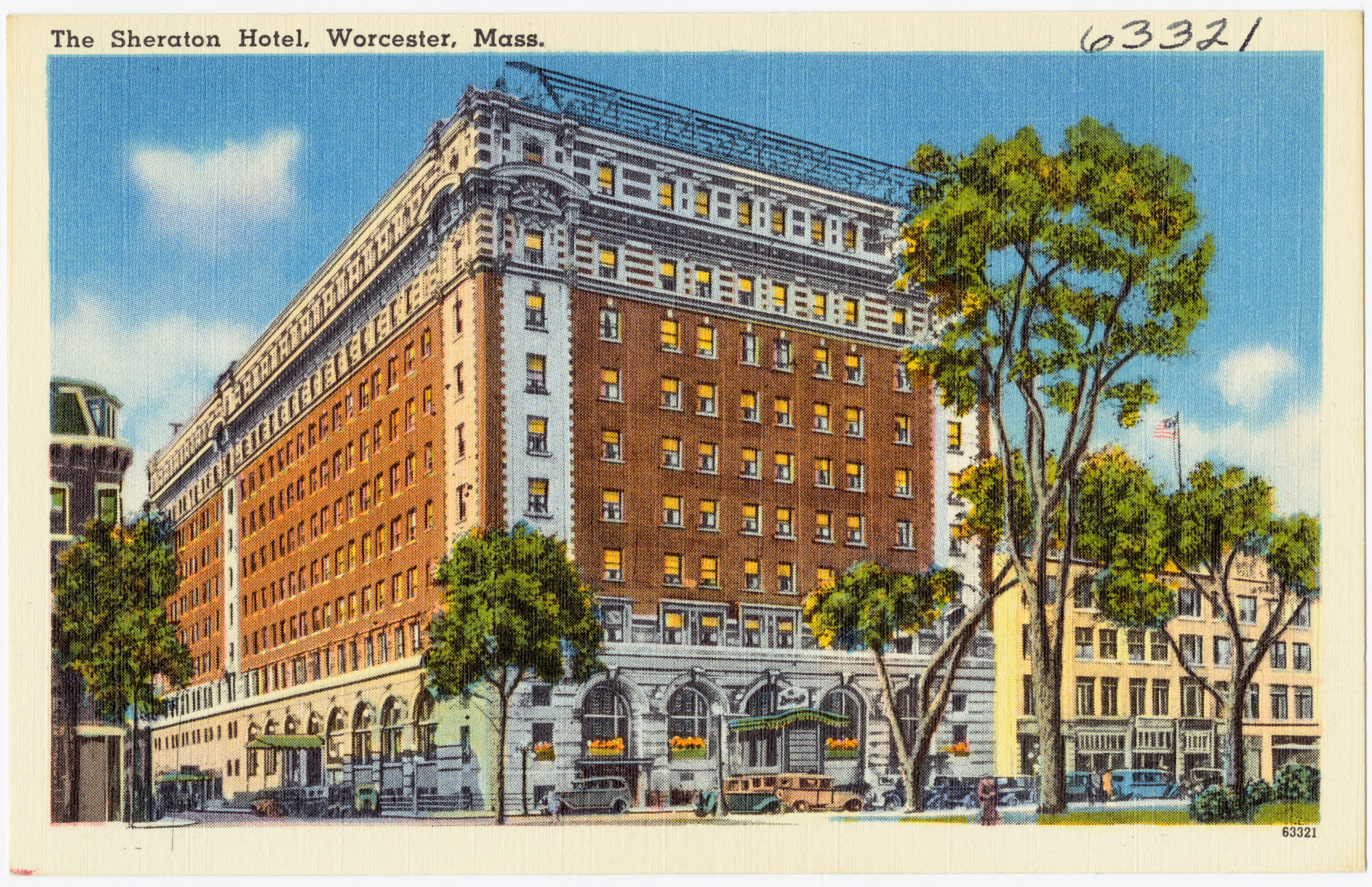
Sheraton Worcester, 1940s, after the 1929 extension was added

The Hotel Bancroft was built by Niagara Falls businessman Frank A. Dudley and operated by the United Hotels Company. It was designed by Buffalo, New York architects Esenwein & Johnson in the Beaux Arts style and was constructed at a cost of over $1.2 million (equivalent to $40,034,000 in 2025). The hotel opened on September 1, 1913, named for Worcester historian and politician George Bancroft. An extension was added in the rear in 1929.

Sheraton bought the Bancroft in 1942 and renamed it the Worcester Sheraton Hotel. In April 1952, the hotel hosted a women's tea for John F. Kennedy's senatorial campaign against Henry Cabot Lodge Jr., who was also there that day. Sheraton sold the hotel in 1955, and it became the Hotel Bancroft again.

The hotel was converted to apartments in 1964. The building was added to the National Register of Historic Places in 1980 and is currently tied as the 11th tallest building in Worcester. It was known as the Bancroft Commons for many years, until being renamed Bancroft on The Grid more recently.

== See also ==
- National Register of Historic Places listings in northwestern Worcester, Massachusetts
- National Register of Historic Places listings in Worcester County, Massachusetts
