= North End, Niagara Falls, New York =

Neighborhood in Niagara Falls, New York

Coordinates: 43.093°N 78.913°W

North End is a neighborhood in Niagara Falls, New York.

== Geography ==
The North End neighborhood extends along Highland Avenue from just north of Ontario Avenue to Hyde Park Boulevard in a northeasterly direction dictated by the contours of the Niagara River like Lewiston Road and Niagara Scenic Parkway.

== Education ==
One school serving the area is Maple Avenue Elementary School.

== History ==
The North End, like Little Italy, has declined significantly over the years. Originally a booming industrial district, predominantly Polish and German, since the 1940s the areas surrounding Highland Avenue have been predominantly African-American, several of the industries have closed and the area has become neglected. Recently, "green" industry has begun to move into the North End, bringing back some jobs.

The Niagara Falls Amtrak station (opened 2016) and Niagara Falls Underground Railroad Heritage Center (opened 2018) are located in the neighborhood. It is mainly considered to be anything located north of the primary railroad tracks within the city, with the exception of west of Ninth Street. The North End for most of the 20th century was predominantly a Polish, German and Italian neighborhood.
