= Parkhurst Whitney =

American politician

1st Village President of Niagara Falls
- In office 1848–1848
- Preceded by: Inaugural holder

Personal details
- Born: September 25, 1784 Conway, Massachusetts, U.S.
- Died: April 26, 1862 (aged 77) Niagara Falls, New York, U.S.
- Resting place: Oakwood Cemetery
- Spouse: Celinda Cowing (m. 1805; died 1860)
- Children: 6
- Parent(s): Jonathan Whitney; Esther Parkhurst Whitney

Military service
- Allegiance: United States; New York
- Branch/service: (New York (state)) New York State Militia
- Rank: Major General
- Battles/wars: War of 1812: • Battle of Queenston Heights

Parkhurst Whitney (September 25, 1784 – April 26, 1862) was an American soldier, businessman, and early settler of Niagara Falls, New York who owned the prominent Cataract House.

== Early life ==
Whitney was born in Conway, Massachusetts on September 25, 1784, the ninth child of Jonathan Whitney (1737–1792) and Esther (née Parkhurst) Whitney (1741–1812). Among his siblings was Nathan Whitney, Joel Whitney, Jonas Whitney and Ami Whitney.

His paternal grandparents were Jonathan Whitney and Lydia (née Jones) Whitney, who lived in Mendon, Massachusetts, and his maternal grandparents were Jonas Parkhurst and Abigail (née Bigelow) Parkhurst.

In 1789, his father moved his family from Massachusetts to Ontario County in Western New York, where he died three years later in 1792.

== Career ==
In 1810, Whitney came to Niagara to operate a mill owned by New York State Assemblyman Augustus Porter, brother of Peter Buell Porter (who later served as United States Secretary of War from 1828 to 1829). Like Porter, Whitney was a land surveyor and, reportedly "made the first survey of Goat Island and made other surveys for the Holland Land Company and for the State of New York."

During the War of 1812, he was commissioned by Governor Daniel D. Tompkins as a Captain in the 163rd Regiment of the New York State Militia. During the Battle of Queenston Heights when he was serving under Gen. Winfield Scott, he was taken prisoner for a short period. On the morning of December 19, 1813, Whitney and his family were "driven from their home when the British marched from Lewiston to Tonawanda burning everything in their path."

They eventually returned in 1814, and began leasing the Eagle tavern, which he later purchased from Augustus Porter and Peter Barton in 1817. On June 19, 1820, Gov. DeWitt Clinton made him a Brigadier general of the 5th Brigade, followed by Major general of the 24th division on March 4, 1826.

In 1831, he purchased and ran Cataract House (originally built in 1825), which became "the most elegant and popular hotel on the American side." Whitney and his son accompanied Gilbert du Motier, Marquis de Lafayette, who had given a speech at Eagle Tavern, to Lockport, New York to witness the opening of the Erie Canal in June 1825 during Lafayette's visit to the United States. After his tour, the Marquis sent him an elaborate chandelier to be used in the hotel. Cataract House was host to Abraham Lincoln, Jenny Lind, Horace Greeley, William Seward, Franklin D. Roosevelt, King Edward VII (when he was the Prince of Wales), and King George V in 1939.

In 1848, Whitney served as the inaugural Village President of Niagara Falls.

== Personal life ==
In 1805, Whitney was married to Celinda Cowing (1783–1860), the daughter of Sarah (née Randall) Cowing and Jabez James Cowing, who served with the Massachusetts Militia in the Revolutionary War. Between 1809 and 1817, they were the parents of six children, two of whom died as children; two sons and four daughters:

- Asenath Beecher Whitney (1809–1859), who married a Polish nobleman, Pierre (Piote) de Kowalewski.
- Angeline Whitney (1812–1857), who married Dexter Ray Jerauld.
- Sally Whitney (1814–1815), who died in infancy.
- Solon Myron Napoleon Whitney (1815–1907), who built the Whitney Mansion in Niagara Falls. He married Francis Elizabeth Drake (1822–1883).
- Celinda Eliza Whitney (1817–1892), who married James Fullerton Trott (1815–1898).

He was "an old and eminent Mason, and a distinguished Knight Templar."

Whitney's wife died on June 12, 1860, and he died on April 26, 1862. After a funeral attended by 3,000 people, he was buried with Masonic honors alongside his wife at Oakwood Cemetery in Niagara Falls.

=== Legacy ===
Three Sisters Islands (off of Goat Island) was named after his three daughters, who in 1817, were the first recorded "non-native girls to visit the islands." Brother Island was named for son Solon Whitney.
