= Paul Dyster =

American politician

Paul A. Dyster
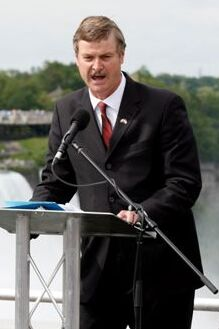
- Dyster in 2009

30th Mayor of Niagara Falls, New York
- In office January 1, 2008 – December 31, 2019
- Preceded by: Vincenzo V. Anello
- Succeeded by: Robert Restaino

Niagara Falls City Council Member
- In office January 1, 2000 – December 31, 2003

Personal details
- Born: April 21, 1954 (age 71) Niagara Falls, New York
- Party: Democratic
- Spouse: Rebecca
- Children: 2
- Profession: Politician, Business Owner

Paul A. Dyster (born April 21, 1954) is an American politician who served as the 30th mayor of Niagara Falls, New York, from 2008 to 2019. He is a member of the Democratic Party.

Having previously served in the Niagara Falls City Council from 2000 to 2003, he was first elected mayor in 2007 and was reelected in 2011 and 2015. He chose not to seek reelection for a fourth term in 2019.

== Early life and education ==
Dyster was born April 21, 1954, in Niagara Falls, New York, the oldest of 10 children, to Dr. Melvin B. Dyster and the late Mary C. Dyster, both of whom were community activists.

Dyster graduated from Bishop Duffy High School in Niagara Falls, New York, in 1972. He was valedictorian and Student Council president, and was active on the school's Debate Team and the soccer team. He graduated summa cum laude in 1976 from the University at Buffalo with a B.A., majoring in Political Science and was a member of the Phi Beta Kappa honor society. He graduated from Johns Hopkins University in 1979 with an M.A., majoring in Political Science. He later obtained a PhD in 1984 in International Relations and Law.

== Early political career ==
=== Education and public relations ===
He currently serves on the Board of Directors for the Environmental Leadership Institute at Niagara University in Lewiston, New York.

He also served as Director of the Graduate Program in International Affairs at The Pentagon from September 1989 to August 1994, and assistant professor for the Department of Politics from 1985 to December 1993 at Catholic University of America.

Dyster was a Fellow of International Affairs for the Council on Foreign Relations from 1987 to 1988.

Dyster was a program coordinator and lecturer from September 1980 to May 1981 at Johns Hopkins University.

=== Business and community experience ===
Dyster was a columnist for the Home Wine & Beer Trade Association's (HWBTA) newspaper. He is a nationally certified beer judge, and owns Niagara Tradition, a homebrewing supply store in Tonawanda, New York.

He is currently a Board Emeritus for the Buffalo-Niagara Riverkeeper and a spokesman for the Niagara River Environmental Coalition. He is a member of the Oversight Board for Advancing Arts and Culture Buffalo Niagara. He is a founding member and spokesman for the Niagara Waterfront Revitalization Task Force. He sits on the Board of Directors for the Niagara Arts and Cultural Center in the Former Niagara Falls High School, and served as the Board President from 2005 to 2007. He is the Board President for the Niagara Experience Center. Dyster is a member of the advisory committee for Save Our Sites Niagara. He served as the Assistant Scoutmaster for Boy Scouts of America Troop 801 Niagara Falls from 1996 to 2004 and as the Scoutmaster from 2004 to 2005, and as a basketball coach for the Whirlpool Park Little League from 1995 to 1996. Dyster is a group leader for the Life Workshops program at SUNY Buffalo, and is a member of the Niagara River Anglers Association.

Dyster was named Citizen of the Year in 2006 by the Niagara Gazette, the Conservationist of the Year by the Adirondack Mountain Club's Niagara Frontier Chapter in 2006, and was presented with the Good Neighbor Award by the Niagara Falls Memorial Medical Center in 2006.

== Mayoralty ==
Dyster became a city councilman in 2000 under Mayor Irene Elia. He then gave up his council seat after one term to run for mayor and was one of four Democratic candidates, who were Dyster, Niagara County Legislator Sam Granieri, Niagara Falls Water Board employee Glenn Choolokian, and City Councilman Vince Anello. Anello won the primary narrowly and went on to win in a landslide against then-Mayor Irene Elia, who was running for a second term.

In the Democratic Primary in September 2007, Dyster won by a narrow margin over Councilman Lewis Rotella, who was considered the favorite to win the primary. Then-Mayor Anello could not run for reelection due to his violation of state election law by having volunteers who were not in his political party nor registered to vote pass out petitions. Anello went on to be indicted on charges of conspiracy, obstruction of justice and scheme to defraud and was sentenced to federal prison in January 2011 for a separate charge of filing false documents.

On Election Day in 2008, Dyster won the city election by a landslide defeating by more than 70 percent Republican Former City Councilwoman Candra Thomason.

Under the Dyster Administration, a new courthouse and public safety building was finished and received LEED certification, a new Niagara Falls Amtrak station was constructed, the historic customhouse was restored and a project to demolish the Niagara Scenic Parkway viaduct and create a new Niagara Gorge State Park began.

In December 2010, Dyster announced that he would seek re-election in 2011. Dyster ran in the primary against former Niagara Falls lawmaker and insurance executive John Accardo (endorsed by the Conservative Party of New York State), community activist Carnell Burch, and former United States Postal Service employee Norton Douglas. In May 2011, the Niagara Falls Democratic Committee endorsed Dyster. In the September 13, 2011, Democratic Primary, he had a resounding victory, garnering 56% of the vote in a four-person field.

In the general election, Dyster defeated Republican challenger Johnny G. Destino and Conservative Party candidate John Accardo, the latter of whom he had defeated in the primary and had not actively campaigned since the primary, winning 52% of the vote against 45% of the vote going to Destino. The remaining 3% went to Accardo. Dyster was the first mayor after a succession of four one-term mayors spanning from 1991 to 2007 to win re-election.

=== The Dyster Administration ===
Department	Position	Name	Years serving
City Administrator		Donna D. Owens	2008-2016
		Nick Melson	2016–Present
Assessor's Office	Assessor	Dominic Penale, Jr.*	2008–2011
		James R. Bird	2011-
Code Enforcement	Building Commissioner	Guy A. Bax*	2008–2010
	Director	Dennis F. Virtuoso	2010-2016
	Building Commissioner	Louis Fontana	2016–Present
Community Development	Director	Robert Antonucci	2008-2011
		Seth Piccirillo	2012-
Office of the City Clerk	City Clerk	Carol Antonucci*	2008-
Finance	Controller	Maria Brown*	2008-2016
	Sandra Peploe (Acting)	2016–Present	
Economic Development	Director	Peter F. Kay	2008–2011
	Executive Director, NFC Development Corporation and Director of Business Development	Anthony Vilardo	2015–Present
Engineering	City Engineer	Ali Marzban	Mar. 2009-Jul. 2009
		Thomas Radomski	2010-May 2011
		Jeffrey Skurka	Jul. 2011-Apr. 2013
Equal Employment Opportunity Office	EEO Officer	Ruby A. Pulliam	2010 (Position created) -2012 (Position abolished)(Department merged with Human Resources, 2012)
Fire Department	Fire Chief	William MacKay*	2008–2010
		Roger Melchior	Nov. 2010-Jan. 2011
		Thomas Colangelo	Jan. 2012-
Human Resources	Director	Joyce Mardon-Serianni*	2008-Aug. 2011
		Ruby Pulliam	Jan. 2012-
Department of Law	Corporation Counsel	Craig H. Johnson	2008-
Management Information Services	Lead Systems Engineer	John Cahill*	2008-2014
	Director	Joseph Morock, Jr.	2015–Present
Planning and Environmental Services	Senior Planner	Thomas DeSantis*	2008-
Police Department	Superintendent	John Chella*	2008-2013
		Bryan DalPorto	2013-
Public Works	Director	David L. Kinney	2008-2015
		John L. Caso	2015–Present
Purchasing	Purchasing Agent	Dean W. Spring*	2008-2013
	Director of Purchasing	Johnny Destino	2015–Present

*Appointed by a previous administration

== Personal life ==
He married Rebecca Ann Lucchetti in 1980 and has two sons, Ian and Bert.

Preceded by Vincenzo V. Anello	Mayor of Niagara Falls, New York; January 1, 2008 – present	Incumbent
