= Three Sisters Islands (New York) =

Islands in the Niagara River. New York

Coordinates: 43.078081°N 79.066039°W

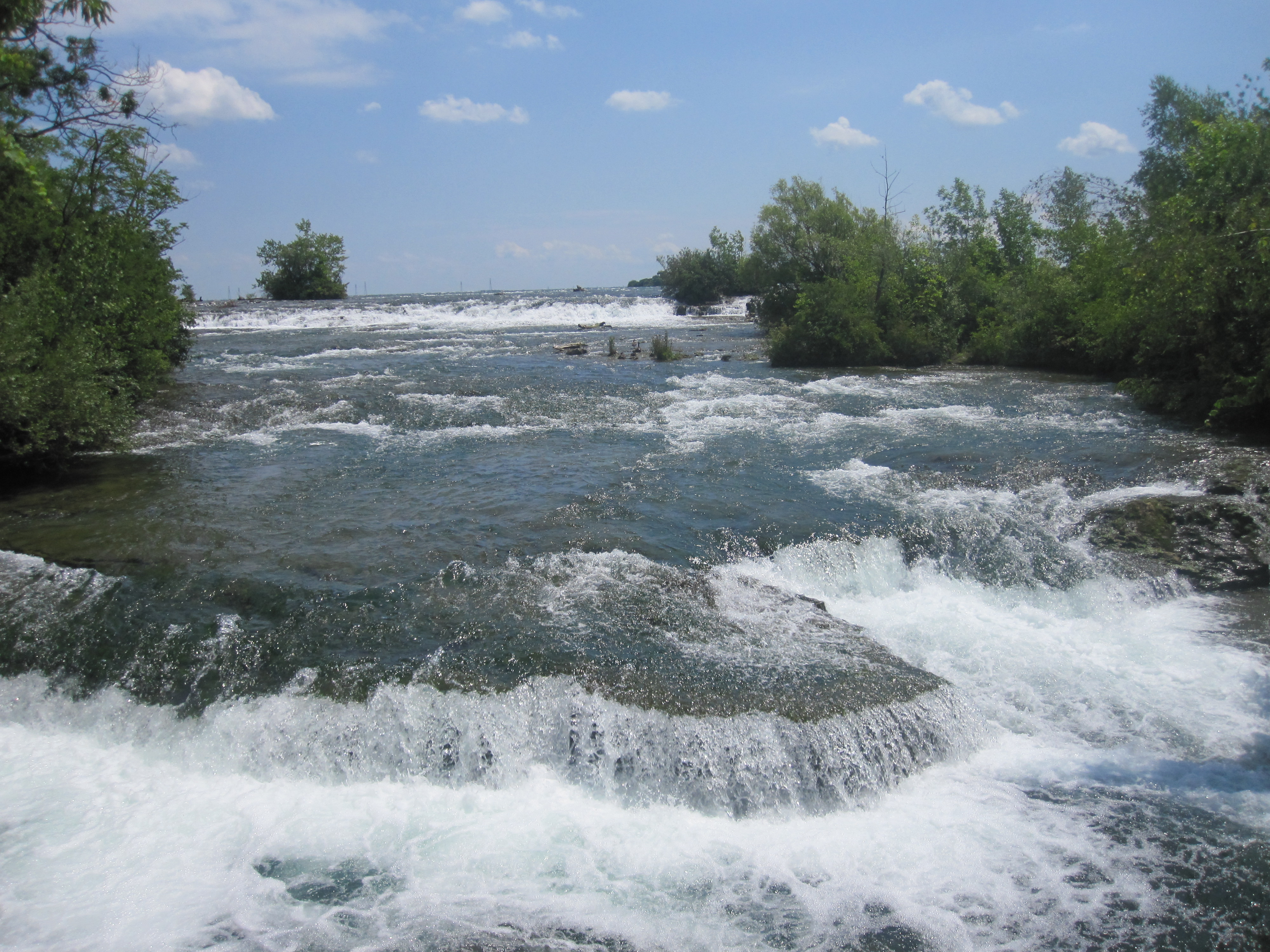
Three Sisters Islands, viewed from Goat Island, in the Niagara River at Niagara Falls, New York

The Three Sisters Islands are islands which lie off the south shoreline of Goat Island. The islands are part of Niagara Falls, New York.

Accessible from Goat Island, the Three Sisters Islands are located just beyond the Canada/U.S. border in Niagara Falls, New York. The islands are named after Celinda, Angelina, and Asenath Whitney (all three of whom are buried in Oakwood Cemetery in Niagara Falls, NY), daughters of General Parkhurst Whitney of Niagara Falls, New York. General Whitney (also buried in Oakwood Cemetery), was a prominent early settler of Niagara Falls, New York. The General moved to Niagara Falls, N.Y. in 1810 and is best known as the founder and operator of the Cataract House Hotel located near the upper rapids just above the falls. General Whitney's daughters are believed to be the first settlers to have trekked to the three small islands.

Map showing the three islands

Before European settlers arrived in North America, Iroquois shamans made sacrifices of food and gifts on the islands and communed with He-No (Mighty Thunderer), the spirit who dwells in the mist-enshrouded cave at the base of the falls. Modern day psychics believe any one can hear the voices of the spirits if they listen carefully while visiting the Three Sisters Islands. Each island supports a variety of microhabitats and has its own floristic character. The Three Sisters Islands are connected by bridges, allowing pedestrians to walk to all three for grand views of the raging rapids in the Niagara River right before its descent over the Horseshoe Falls.
