= Peter A. Porter =

American politician

Peter Augustus Porter
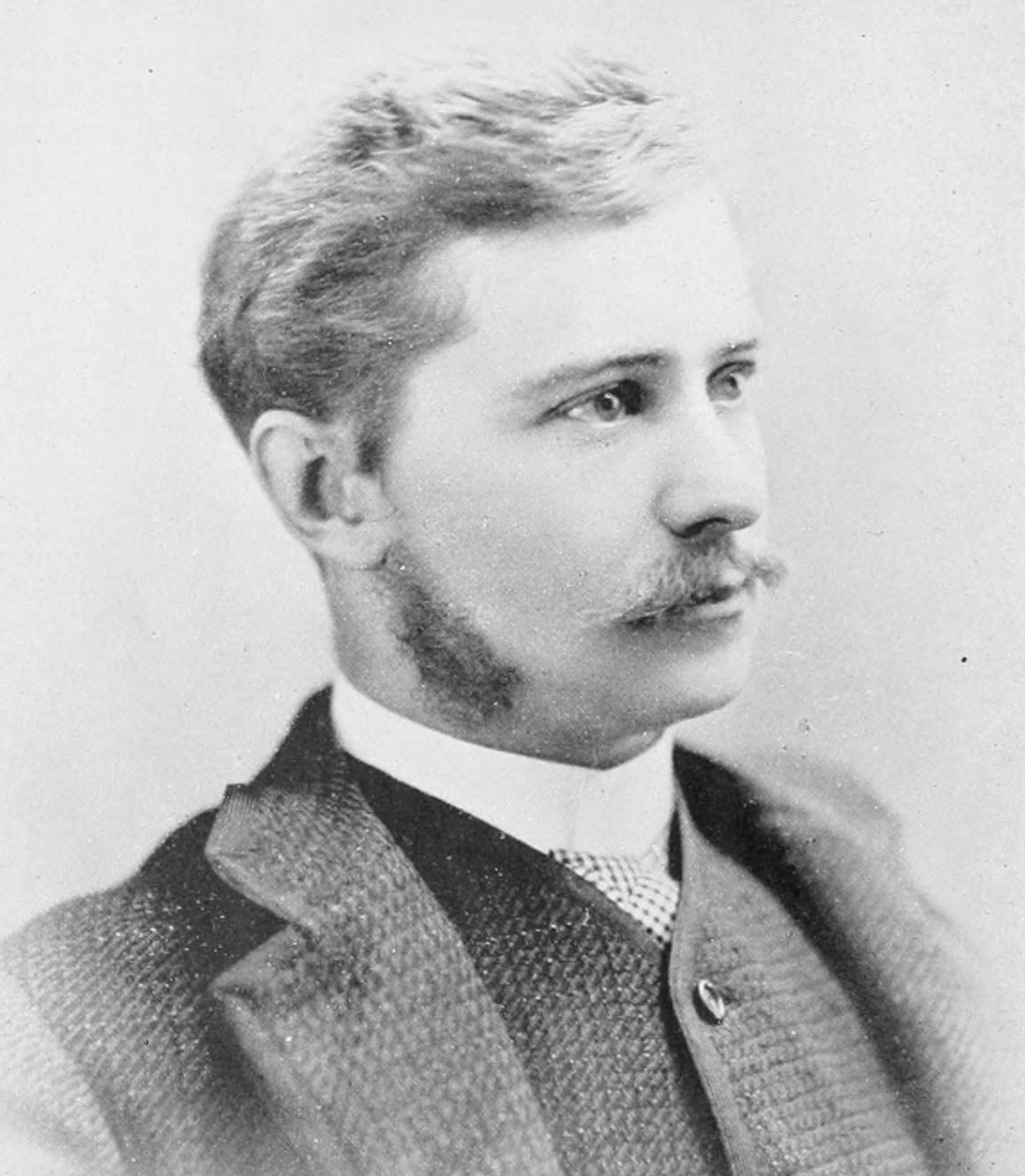

Member of the U.S. House of Representatives from New York's 34th district
- In office March 4, 1907 – March 4, 1909
- Preceded by: James Wolcott Wadsworth
- Succeeded by: James S. Simmons

Member of the New York Assembly from Niagara County
- In office January 1, 1886 – December 31, 1887
- Preceded by: Walter P. Horne
- Succeeded by: Nelson D. Haskell

Village President of Niagara Falls
- In office January 1, 1878 – December 31, 1878

Personal details
- Born: October 10, 1853 Niagara Falls, New York
- Died: December 15, 1925 (aged 72) Buffalo, New York
- Resting place: Oakwood Cemetery
- Party: Republican; Independent Republican
- Spouse: Alice Adelle Taylor (m. 1877)
- Relations: See Breckinridge family
- Children: 3
- Parent(s): Peter A. Porter; Mary Cabell Breckenridge
- Education: St. Paul's School
- Alma mater: Yale College (1874)

Peter Augustus Porter (October 10, 1853 – December 15, 1925) was a U.S. representative from New York, and grandson of Peter Buell Porter. Porter was the son of Colonel Peter A. Porter, the Civil War hero who bravely died in the bloody Battle of Cold Harbor. Porter was one of Niagara's first native poets.

== Early life ==
Porter was born in Niagara Falls, New York on October 10, 1853, the only son of Mary Cabell Breckenridge (1826–1854) and Col. Peter Augustus Porter (1827–1864), who was the only son of Gen. Peter Buell Porter (1773–1844) with his first wife. His mother died in the cholera epidemic when he was four years old. He had a half-brother, George Morris Porter (1863–1907), by his father's second marriage to Josephine Matilda Morris (1831–1892), a daughter of George Washington Morris (1799–1834) and granddaughter of Lewis Morris (1754–1824) and great-granddaughter of Lewis Morris of Morrisania.

He was taught by private teachers and later attended St. Paul's School in Concord, New Hampshire from 1865 to 1871. He graduated from Yale College in 1874 and then traveled extensively.

== Career ==
From 1880 to 1895, Porter owned the Niagara Falls Gazette, which had been founded in 1854, and converted it into a daily newspaper in 1893. He built the Arcade Building on Falls street in which the Gazette and the United States post office were housed for many years. He owned the famous old hostelry, the Cataract House, for many years. He was president of the Cataract Bank for some time.

In 1885, his family sold Goat Island and much of the mainland adjoining the river, which the Porter family had owned since 1816, to the Niagara Reservation, which New York State had established to create Niagara Falls State Park in the same year, becoming the first state park in the United States. He had estimated the value of the island at $1,000,000 in 1884. In 1889, Porter was elected secretary and treasurer, succeeding S. F. Rankine. He served as a director of the predecessor of the Niagara Falls Power Company, called Niagara River Hydraulic Tunnel, Power, and Sewer Company.

=== Political office ===
Before the City of Niagara Falls was incorporated on March 17, 1892, Porter served as village president in 1878.

In 1886, Porter was elected a member of the New York State Assembly in the New York State Legislature, as a Republican, representing Niagara County's 2nd District. He served in 109th and 110th New York State Legislature until 1887. As Assemblyman, he introduced and brought about the passage of the celebrated Niagara Tunnel Bill, which sanctioned the State to utilize and develop electric power at Niagara Falls. Between 1886 and 1894, the New York State Legislature granted six charters to take water from above the Falls. One of these grants gave a company the right to develop 200,000 horse power and another grant ceded all the water which would pass through a canal 100 feet wide and 14 feet deep.

In 1888, he argued against a bill before Governor David B. Hill that would construct a 200 foot wide boulevard stretching 20 miles from Niagara Falls to Buffalo, claiming that the $375,000 expense was too great for the communities affected. In 1903, he was successful in defeating Senator Irving L'Hommedieu's Niagara Falls Charter bill, along with W. Caryl Ely, George Urban Jr., and Charles R. Huntley.

In 1907, he was elected as an Independent Republican to the 60th United States Congress, holding office from March 4, 1907, to March 3, 1909. He represented the 34th Congressional District, which comprised Niagara, Orleans, Genesee, Livingston and Wyoming counties. He declined to be a candidate for renomination.

=== Later life ===
Following his stint in politics, Porter engaged in the study and writing of history of the Niagara frontier, and was a prominent member of the Buffalo Historical Society. He was the founder, president, and later honorary president for life, of the Niagara Frontier Historical Society. He donated many of the collections relics and took an active interest in the Niagara County Pioneer Association, serving as its president for three terms. He was served as vice-president of the New York State Library Association in 1900.

In 1915, Porter presented a plan for developing 2,000,000 electrical horse power by damming the lower Niagara River and harnessing the power of Niagara Falls. He stated:

I represented the Niagara District in the Sixtieth Congress. On the floor of the House of Representatives I stated that the people of my district were more interested in preserving the scenic beauty of the Falls of Niagara than were any people on earth. But we did ask that just as far as engineering science would decide that the water of the cataract could be safely used for commerce, without impairing the scenic beauty of Niagara Falls, to that extent power development should be not only permitted, but encouraged."

In 1922, Porter and his associate in the plan, T. Kennard Thomson, toured the prospective site for the power dam with members of the New York State Water Power Board. The plan called for immense power development at Foster Flats by means of a huge dam which would back up the waters of the Lower Niagara River, obliterating the upper and lower rapids of the whirlpool and utilizing the entire flow of the river.

== Personal life ==
On February 13, 1877, Porter married Alice Adelle Taylor (1853–1934), daughter of Virgil Corydon Taylor (1817–1889) and Harriett C. Dunlap (1832–1900). Alice was descended from Richard Taylor, who came from England to Massachusetts Colony in 1643. Together, Peter and Alice had three sons:

- Peter A. Porter, Jr. (b. 1877), who married Geneva Thompson in 1907
- Cabell Breckinridge Porter (b. 1881), an illustrator who married Grace S. Sizer
- Preston Buell Porter (1891–1978), who married Margaret Ransom (b. 1894)

Porter died at his home in Buffalo, New York on December 15, 1925. He was interred in Oakwood Cemetery in his hometown of Niagara Falls, New York.

New York State Assembly
Preceded by Walter P. Horne	New York State Assembly; Niagara County, 2nd District; 1886–1887	Succeeded by Nelson D. Haskell
U.S. House of Representatives
Preceded by James Wolcott Wadsworth	Member of the U.S. House of Representatives from New York's 34th congressional district 1907–1909	Succeeded by James S. Simmons
