= List of mayors of Niagara Falls, New York =

Mayor of Niagara Falls
- Incumbent; Robert Restaino since January 1, 2020
- Style: His Honor
- Term length: Four years
- Inaugural holder: George W. Wright
- Formation: 1892
- Salary: $77,701 (2012)

The office of mayor of Niagara Falls, New York is currently held by Robert Restaino. Prior to the establishment of the mayorship, the highest official in Niagara Falls was known as the "village president" and was held by Peter A. Porter in 1878.

== List of mayors ==
| # | Name | Picture | Party | Took office | Left office | Notes |
|---|---|---|---|---|---|---|
| 1 | George W. Wright | | Democratic | April 26, 1892 | March 1893 | |
| 2 | Mighellis B. Butler | | Democrat | March 1893 | March 1894 | Welcomed the Duke of Veragua to Niagara Falls in 1893. |
| 3 | David Phillips | | Republican | March 1894 | March 1895 | Elected with an 800-vote majority. |
| 4 | Obediah W. Cutler | | Democratic | March 1895 | March 1896 | Cutler is referenced as being the prime mover behind the Suspension Bridge water works which was established in 1876. |
| 5 | Arthur Schoellkopf | Schoellkopf | Republican | March 1896 | March 1897 | His campaign slogan was "municipal government is business, not politics" and he was overwhelmingly elected by every district in the city. After a year in office, Schoellkopf decided not to run for a second term citing that "his private business would not allow him to devote the necessary time to the city’s affairs" and declined the Republican mayoral nomination for 1897. |
| 6 | Arthur C. Hastings | | Republican | March 1897 | March 1900 | Elected to 1st 1-year term in March 1897. On April 15, 1897, a charter amendment increased the mayor’s term to two years. He was reelected to a second term for 2 years in March 1898. |
| 7 | Mighellis B. Butler | | Democratic | March 1900 | April 15, 1902 | Reelected after serving as the 2nd Mayor of Niagara Falls. |
| 8 | John M. Hancock | | Republican | April 15, 1902 | December 31, 1904 | |
| 9 | Obediah W. Cutler | | Republican | January 1, 1905 | December 31, 1906 | This was Cutler's second time in office, having been elected first in 1895 and serving as the 4th Mayor of Niagara Falls. |
| 10 | Anthony C. Douglass | | Democratic | January 1, 1907 | December 31, 1910 | Douglass was a contractor with a business at the Jewett Building and resided at 259 Third St. |
| 11 | Philip J. Keller | | Democratic | January 1, 1911 | December 31, 1912 | Keller, of "Phil J. Keller & Son" was a butcher with a successful shop at 2013 Main St. |
| 12 | William Laughlin | | Democratic | January 1, 1913 | December 31, 1915 | During 1914, the Legislature enacted the "Optional City Government Law" which permitted cities of the second and third class the option of adopting one of seven forms of local government. Voters adopted "Plan C" with the council/manager plan to become effective in 1916. By 1916, there were 98 council-manager cities in the United States. |
| 13 | George W. Whitehead | | Republican | January 1, 1916 | December 31, 1920 | |
| 14 | Maxwell M. Thompson | | Republican | January 1, 1920 | December 31, 1924 | At this time, the mayors office was in the Gluck Building on Second and Falls Streets. Thompson declined to run for re-election. |
| 15 | William Laughlin | | Democratic | January 1, 1925 | December 31, 1931 | |
| 16 | Frank A. Jenss | | Republican | January 1, 1932 | December 31, 1935 | Jenss served three terms as a city councilmen prior to being elected mayor. He declined to seek reelection and instead supported Walter Greig, then councilman. |
| 17 | W. Levell Draper | | Republican | January 1, 1936 | December 31, 1939 | |
| 18 | Ernest W. Mirrington, Jr. | | Republican | January 1, 1940 | December 31, 1942 | Resigned in 1942 (at the time, the youngest mayor in New York at 34) to join the U.S. Army. Mirrington had previously tried to join the U.S. Navy and U.S. Coast Guard. |
| 19 | Eugene C. Butler | | Democratic | January 1, 1942 | December 31, 1942 | Appointed to fill the term of Ernest W. Mirrington, Jr., won the Democratic nomination for mayor but was defeated in the general election by Stephen A. Lamb. |
| 20 | Stephen A. Lamb | | Republican | January 1, 1943 | December 31, 1947 | |
| 21 | William R. Lupton | | Democratic | January 1, 1948 | December 31, 1951 | |
| 22 | Ernest W. Mirrington, Jr. | | Republican | January 1, 1952 | December 31, 1955 | In May 1952, there was an 18-day strike of 600 city employees that disrupted services. The strike was settled through the efforts of a citizens’ committee. |
| 23 | Calvin L. Keller | | Republican | January 1, 1956 | December 31, 1962 | Keller welcomed John F. Kennedy to Niagara Falls in 1962 during his visit to Western New York. |
| 24 | E. Dent Lackey | | Democratic | January 1, 1963 | December 31, 1975 | Lackey was an ex-Methodist minister who served three, four-year terms. |
| 25 | Michael C. O'Laughlin | | Democratic | January 1, 1976 | December 31, 1991 | O'Laughlin served four, four-year terms. |
| 26 | Jacob A. Palillo | | Republican | January 1, 1992 | December 31, 1995 | Palillo was president of the Niagara Falls Fire Fighters Association for 20 years and first ran for mayor in 1987. Elected in 1991 defeating Anthony F. Quaranto, but in 1995 lost a re-election bid to James C. Galie. |
| 27 | James C. Galie | | Democratic | January 1, 1996 | December 31, 1999 | Galie was a former assistant police chief elected on a pro-casino platform |
| 28 | Irene J. Elia | | Republican | January 1, 2000 | December 31, 2003 | |
| 29 | Vincenzo V. Anello | | Democratic | January 1, 2004 | December 31, 2007 | Following his term as mayor, Anello faced federal charges related to wrongful receipt of a payment by a public official, conspiracy to affect commerce by extortion, and two counts of depriving citizens of honest services from a government official. Anello pleaded guilty to submitting false claims for $120,000 worth of pension benefits, as part of a plea bargain that saw the government drop the public corruption charge. Anello served a 10-month sentence. |
| 30 | Paul Dyster | | Democratic | January 1, 2008 | December 31, 2019 | |
| 31 | Robert Restaino | | Democratic | January 1, 2020 | Present | |

== List of village presidents ==
| Name | Picture | Village | Party | Took office | Left office | Notes |
|---|---|---|---|---|---|---|
| General Parkhurst Whitney | | Village of Niagara Falls | | 1848 | | Whitney's son built the Whitney Mansion in Niagara Falls, New York in 1849. |
| Colonel John Fisk | | Village of Bellevue | | 1854 | | Fisk was an official of the Bellevue Land Company |
| Peter A. Porter | Porter | Village of Niagara Falls | Republican | 1878 | 1878 | Also a member of the New York State Assembly in 1886 and 1887 and elected to the 60th United States Congress. |
| Colonel Charles P. Gaskill | | Village of Niagara Falls | | 1880s | | Gaskill's presidency was marked by firm enforcement of law and order. |

== History ==
- In 1892, upon the establishment of the mayors office, the length of office was a one-year term.
- In 1897, the term limit was changed to a two-year term.
- In 1901, the term was changed again to begin on the third Tuesday of April. The mayor, as the chief executive officer, no longer voted or took part in council meetings. A president of the council was elected, along with the alderman from each of the six wards and four aldermen elected at large. The president of the Common Council assumed the tie-breaking vote and the "municipal year" was changed to begin on the third Tuesday of April.
- In 1902, the New York State Legislature decided to change the political terms of local officials to coincide with the calendar year. The Niagara Falls Common Council opposed the change, but it passed and interrupted the first term of Mayor Hancock. Hancock's term began on April 15, 1902, but ended on Dec. 31, 1902. Upon his reelection, he began his second term on January 1, 1903.
- In 1904, the Town of Niagara Falls and the Village of Niagara Falls were amalgamated to form the "City of Niagara Falls."
- From 1916 to 1985, government in Niagara Falls consisted of a council of four members and a mayor. The mayor and council members were elected to four-year terms and they appointed the city manager, who ran the day-to-day operation of city government.

== Mayoral elections ==
The 2015 mayoral election was held on Tuesday November 3, 2015, with the following candidates: Incumbent mayor Paul Dyster (Democrat) and challenger John Accardo (Republican). Dyster won (4,267 to 3,468) his third term as Mayor of Niagara Falls. With the win, Dyster joined E. Dent Lackey as the only two three-term mayors in Niagara Falls and became the second longest tenured after former Mayor Michael O'Laughlin, the city’s longest-tenured mayor who held four consecutive terms from 1976 to 1991.
