= James S. Simmons (New York politician) =

American politician

James Samuel Simmons
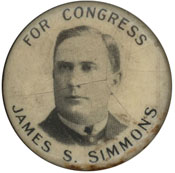
- Campaign button, 1908

Member of the U.S. House of Representatives from New York's 34th district
- In office March 4, 1909 – March 3, 1913
- Preceded by: Peter A. Porter
- Succeeded by: George W. Fairchild

Personal details
- Born: November 25, 1861 Liberty, Maryland
- Died: November 28, 1935 (aged 74) St. Petersburg, Florida
- Party: Republican Party
- Education: Frederick College

James Samuel Simmons (November 25, 1861 – November 28, 1935) was a U.S. representative from New York and nephew of fellow congressman Milton George Urner.

Born near Liberty, Maryland, Simmons attended the public schools and the local academy at Liberty. He graduated from Frederick College. He moved to Roanoke, Virginia, in 1880 and engaged in the real estate business. He moved to Niagara Falls, New York, in 1894 and continued in the real estate business. He served as chairman of the Republican city committee in 1907 and 1908.

Simmons was elected as a Republican to the Sixty-first and Sixty-second United States Congresses (March 4, 1909 – March 3, 1913). He was an unsuccessful candidate for reelection in 1912 to the Sixty-third Congress. He served as the delegate to the Republican National Convention in 1912. He resumed the real estate business in Niagara Falls, New York, and also, in 1927, in St. Petersburg, Florida, where he died on November 28, 1935. He was interred in Riverdale Cemetery in Lewiston, New York.

== Sources ==
- United States Congress. "James S. Simmons (id: S000418)". Biographical Directory of the United States Congress.

U.S. House of Representatives
Preceded by Peter A. Porter	Member of the U.S. House of Representatives from New York's 34th congressional district 1909–1913	Succeeded by George W. Fairchild
