= Henry A. Constantine =

American politician (1876–1943)

Henry A. Constantine

Henry Arthur Constantine (October 6, 1876 – April 16, 1943) was an American politician who served in the New York State Assembly for two terms from 1911 to 1912, representing Niagara County's second district.

Constantine was born on October 6, 1876, in either the town of Sherrill or Kenwood, New York, the son of Thomas and Johanna (Burke) Constantine. After attending Syracuse University, he moved to Niagara Falls in 1901 and became a lawyer.

Constantine secured the Republican nomination for Niagara County's second district in the New York State Assembly on September 23, 1910. He defeated Democratic nominee John J. Welch in November. He served on the Revision and Excise committees. He was renominated in 1911 and was reelected in November. In his secong term, he served on the Codes, Revision and Excise committees. Constantine did not seek a third term in 1912.

After leaving the State Assembly, Constantine worked as the city of Niagara Falls' deputy corporation counsel from 1916 to 1920, owned a pulp mill in Thorold, Ontario, and organzied and managed the Triumph Trap Company in Oneida.

Constantine died on April 16, 1943, while visiting his aunt in Kenwood.

New York State Assembly
Preceded by Philip J. Keller	New York State Assembly; Niagara County, Second District; 1911-1912	Succeeded by Frank Mead Bradley
