= Brother Island (Niagara River) =

Island in the Niagara River in the US state of New York

Coordinates: 43°04′43″N 79°04′07″W

Brother Island is a small, uninhabited island off the coast of Goat Island in the U.S. state of New York. It lies in the Niagara River, close to the Horseshoe Falls and the Three Sisters Islands. It is part of the city of Niagara Falls.

It is one of only five islands in the area surrounding the Horseshoe Falls which have not been claimed by Canada.
