= Philip J. Keller =

American politician (1857–1922)

Philip J. Keller

Philip J. Keller (December 21, 1857 – April 4, 1922) was an American politician who served in the New York State Assembly for one term in 1910, representing Niagara County's second district. He also was mayor of Niagara Falls, New York from 1911 to 1912.

Keller was born on December 21, 1857 in Niagara Falls. He served as the city's alderman-at-large in 1906 and 1907. He unsuccessfully ran for the New York State Assembly 1908 as a Democrat, losing to incumbent Republican W. Levell Draper in the race to represent Niagara County's second district. He successfully ran in 1909, defeating Robert L. Rice for the Assembly seat.

In November 1910, Keller was elected mayor of Niagara Falls, the first native-born mayor in the city's history. He served until 1912 and was succeeded by Democrat William Laughlin.

He ran again for Assembly in 1917, losing in November to Nicholas V. V. Franchot II.

Keller died on April 4, 1922 in Niagara Falls.

New York State Assembly
Preceded by W. Levell Draper	New York State Assembly; Niagara County, Second District; 1910	Succeeded by Henry A. Constantine
