= Frank Mead Bradley =

American politician (1864–1930)

Frank Mead Bradley

Frank Mead Bradley (April 14, 1864 – September 21, 1930) was an American politician who served in the New York State Assembly for one term in 1913, representing Niagara County's second district in the 136th New York State Legislature.

Bradley was born on April 14, 1864 in either the town of Somerset or Hartland, New York.

By 1906, Bradley was Somerset's town supervisor. In August 1908, he was among three candidates for the Republican nomination for Niagara County's second district in the State Assembly. He lost the nomination to incumbent W. Levell Draper. He ran for Assembly again in 1912 and won election in November. After securing the Republican nomination in 1913, he lost reelection to Democrat John W. Williams.

Outside of politics, Bradley was a farmer and fruit grower. By 1915, he was president of the New York State Fruit Growers Association. In June 1918, he was elected president of the New York State Federation of Agriculture.

Bradley died at his home in Barker on September 21, 1930.

New York State Assembly
Preceded by Henry A. Constantine	New York State Assembly; Niagara County, Second District; 1913	Succeeded by John W. Williams
