= W. Levell Draper =

American politician (1867–1952)

W. Levell Draper

William Levell Draper (February 25, 1865 – January 26, 1940) was an American politician who served in the New York State Assembly for four terms from 1906 to 1909, representing Niagara County's second district. He also was mayor of Niagara Falls, New York from 1936 to January 1, 1940.

== Early life ==
Draper was born either on February 24, 1865, in Carthage, New York, or on February 25, 1865, in Theresa, New York, the son of Philorius and Emaline Cowan Draper.

He studied medicine in Theresa and taught at and was principal of schools in Natural Bridge and West Carthage. He then left the state to attend Hahnemann Medical College in Chicago, where he graduated in 1890. He returned that year to New York to practice medicine in Wilson.

== Political and business career ==
Draper became a member of the Niagara County Republican County Committee and served as president of the village of Wilson in the early 1900s. In 1904, he lost the Republican nomination to represent Niagara County's second district in the New York State Assembly to John H. Leggett.

He successfully ran for State Assembly in 1905 and served in the 129th through 132nd New York State Legislatures from 1906 to 1909.

He moved to Puerto Rico in 1913 to run a pineapple plantation and moved to Niagara Falls in 1915. By 1918, Draper was elected Niagara County coroner and served through 1924 and again from 1927 to 1935.

In November 1935, Draper was elected mayor of Niagara Falls after defeating Democrat Eugene C. Butler.

== Death ==
Draper retired as Niagara Falls mayor on January 1, 1940. On January 7, he broke his hip after falling at home. He died on January 26 at Millard Fillmore Hospital in Buffalo from complications of the fall.

New York State Assembly
Preceded by John H. Leggett	New York State Assembly; Niagara County, Second District; 1906-1909	Succeeded by Philip J. Keller
