= Cataract House =

Historic hotel in Niagara Falls, New York

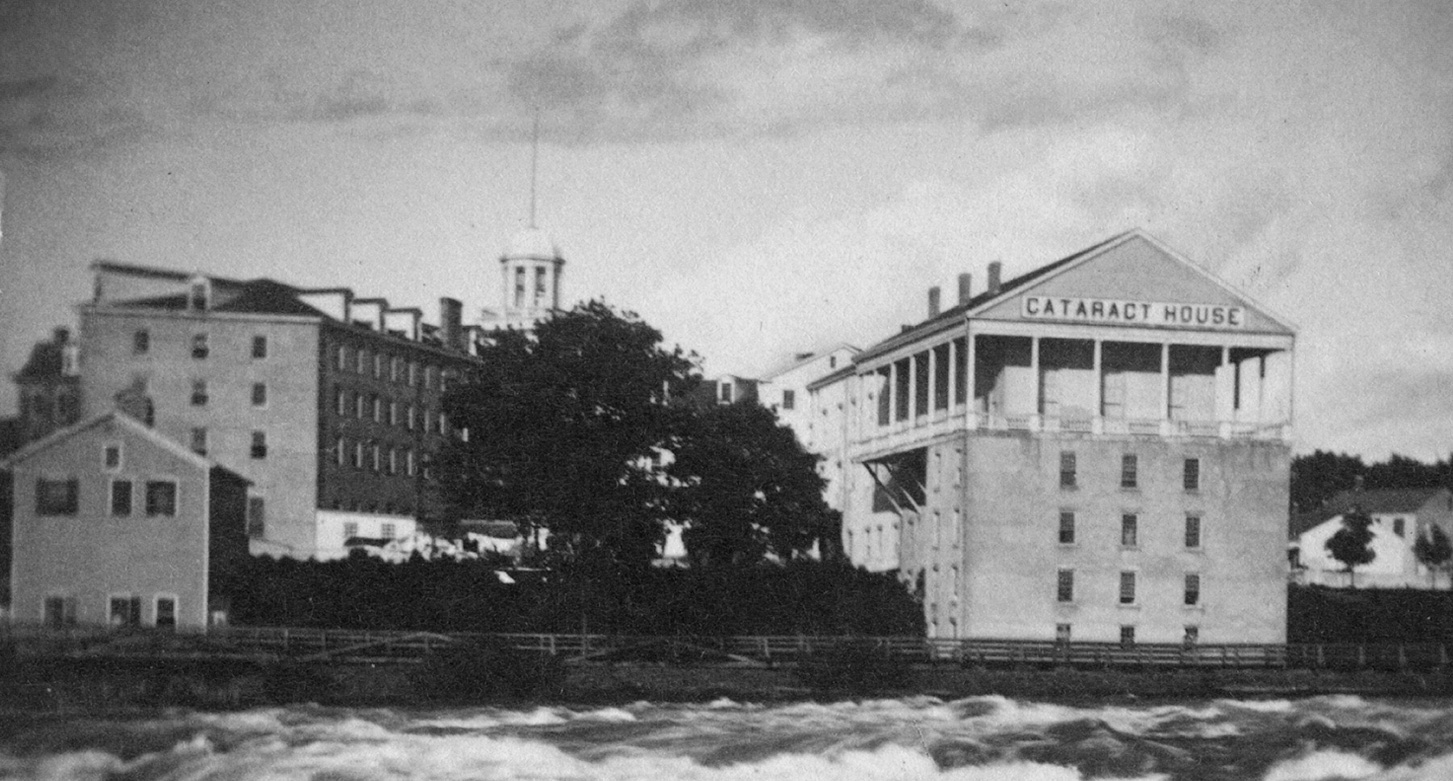
- Interactive map of the Cataract House area

General information
- Status: Demolished
- Type: Hotel
- Architectural style: American colonial architecture
- Location: Old Main Street at Riverway.
- Coordinates: 43.083795°N 79.063215°W
- Completed: 1860
- Opening: 1825
- Owner: Various: David Chapman 1825–1835; Parkhurst Whitney 1835–1846; Solon Whitney, Dexter R. Jerauld and James F. Trott (under Whitney, Jerauld, and Company) 1846–1891; Peter A. Porter 1891–1909; John F. MacDonald 1909–1937; Union Trust Company 1937–1945; Eagle Tavern Corporation 1945

Technical details
- Floor count: 5

Design and construction
- Architect: Walter Williams (master builder for 1845 additions)

The Cataract House was a hotel in the neighborhood of Buffalo Avenue in Niagara Falls, New York. The hotel was established in 1825 but destroyed by fire in 1945. It was a major stop on the Underground Railroad and it was the largest hotel in Niagara Falls. The hotel's name refers to the large and powerful waterfall next to property.

== History ==
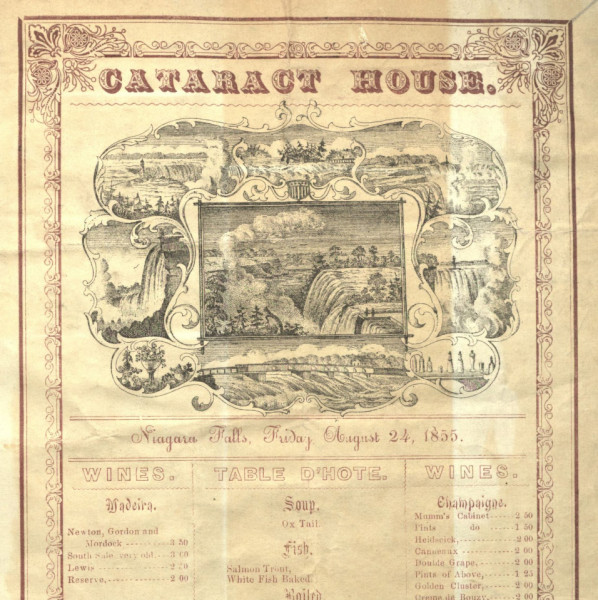
Cataract House restaurant menu (August 24, 1855)

The Cataract House Hotel was built on the Niagara River bank in 1825 by owner David Chapman. The land for the hotel near what is now Old Main Street and Buffalo Avenue between Red Coach Inn and Niagara Falls State Park was originally owned by Judge Samuel DeVeaux. In 1831, Parkhurst Whitney purchased the hotel and ran it for several years. Whitney later leased the hotel to a corporation run by his son, Solon Whitney (who owned the Whitney Mansion in Niagara Falls), and sons-in-law, James Fullerton Trott and Dexter Ray Jerauld.

After Whitney's death in 1862, his son Solon owned the Hotel until 1891 when it was sold to Peter A. Porter (who served as a U.S. Representative from 1907 to 1909). Porter was the son of Peter Augustus Porter, who was the only son of Gen. Peter Buell Porter of War of 1812 fame. The Porter family sold the hotel to John McDonald in 1909, who owned it until 1945.

Cataract House, which became "the most elegant and popular hotel on the American side," was host to Abraham Lincoln, Jenny Lind, Horace Greeley, William Seward, Franklin D. Roosevelt, King Edward VII (when he was the Prince of Wales), and King George V in 1939.

The hotel, which by then had occupied an entire city block was across the street from Red Coach Inn, was destroyed by fire in 1945.

The site today is Heritage Park located between Buffalo Avenue and Riverway with roadway providing access to the Niagara Reservation – Niagara Falls State Park.

=== Role in the Underground Railroad ===
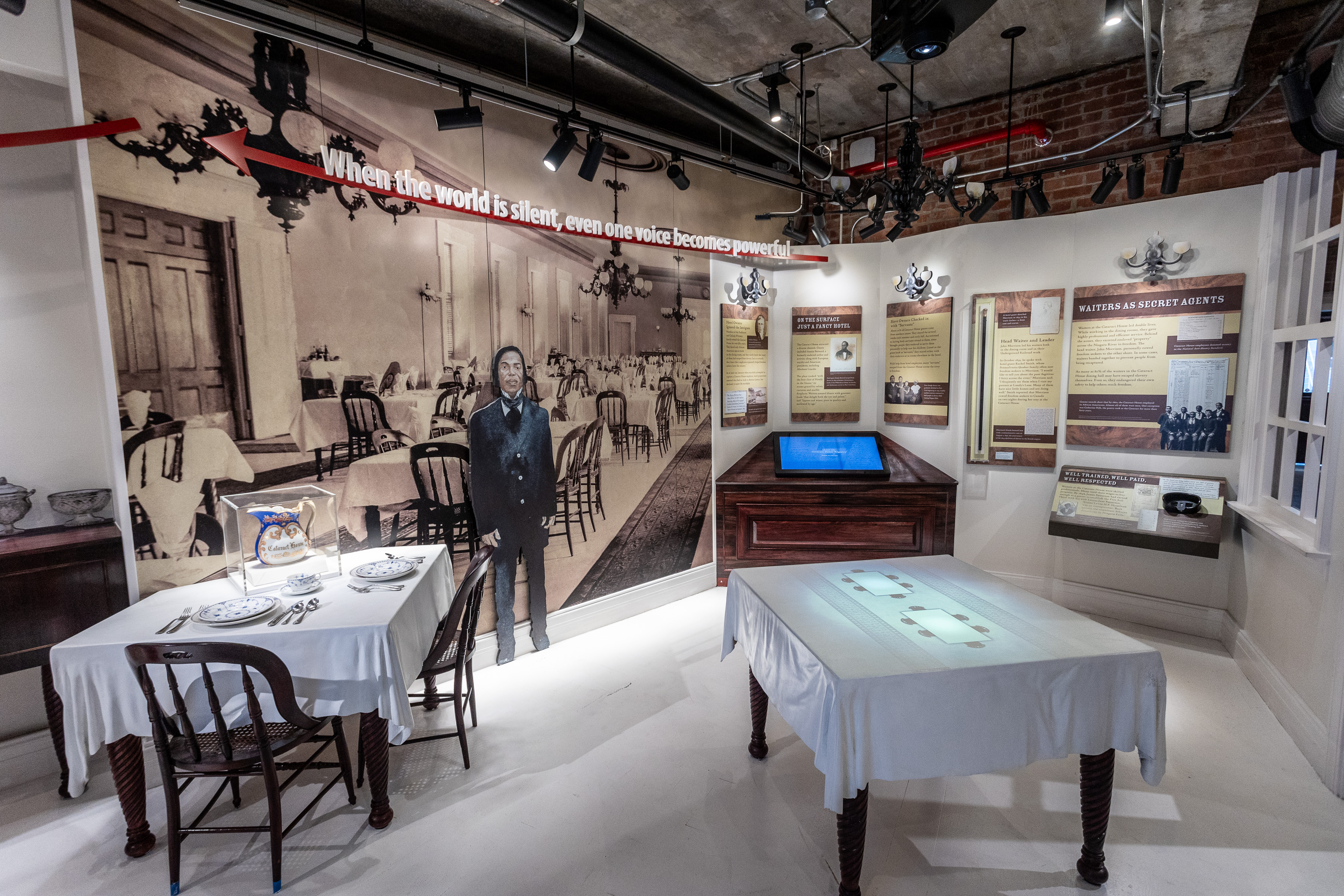
Cataract House exhibit at the Niagara Falls Underground Railroad Heritage Center

The Cataract House employed an entirely African-American wait staff, who helped many enslaved people to freedom in Canada. White families would bring enslaved African Americans with them on their vacations to view the Natural Wonder of Niagara Falls. Black hotel staff would privately engage the enslaved people and offer to take them to freedom in Canada, if they could be ready quickly. Those who chose the daring escape would be given the route from a side door, along just a few city blocks, to a steep, slippery staircase down to the gorge below of the falls. There they met the rowboat that would ferry them across the treacherous gorge to safety on the Canadian side. This system, supported by all the Black staff and enabled by the white management, operated from 1825 until 1865.

In 2018, a model of the hotel was constructed at the Niagara Falls Underground Railroad Heritage Center to highlight its history and importance to the Underground Railroad and the history of Niagara Falls.

== Photos ==
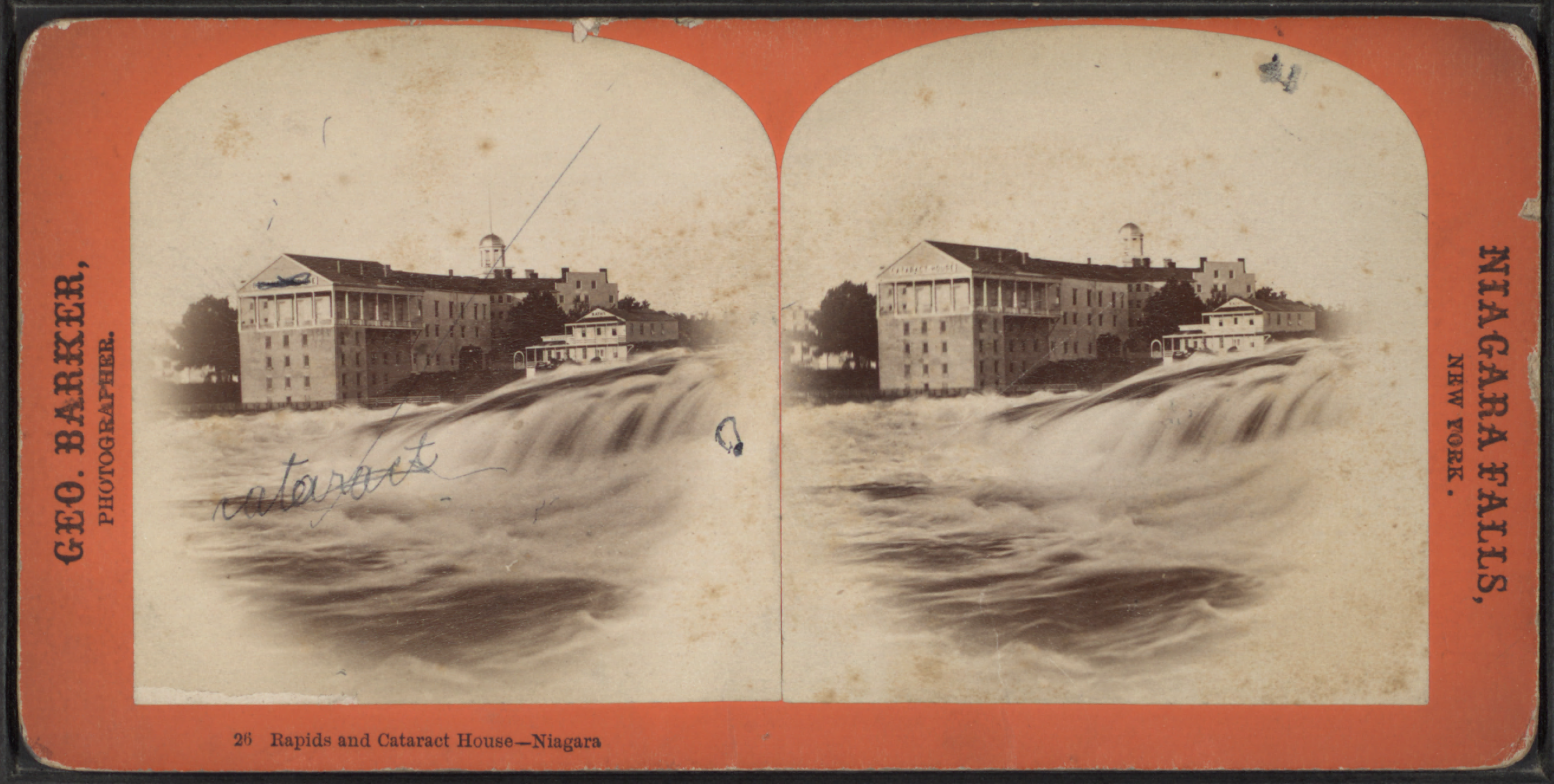
Rapids and Cataract House, 1844–1894

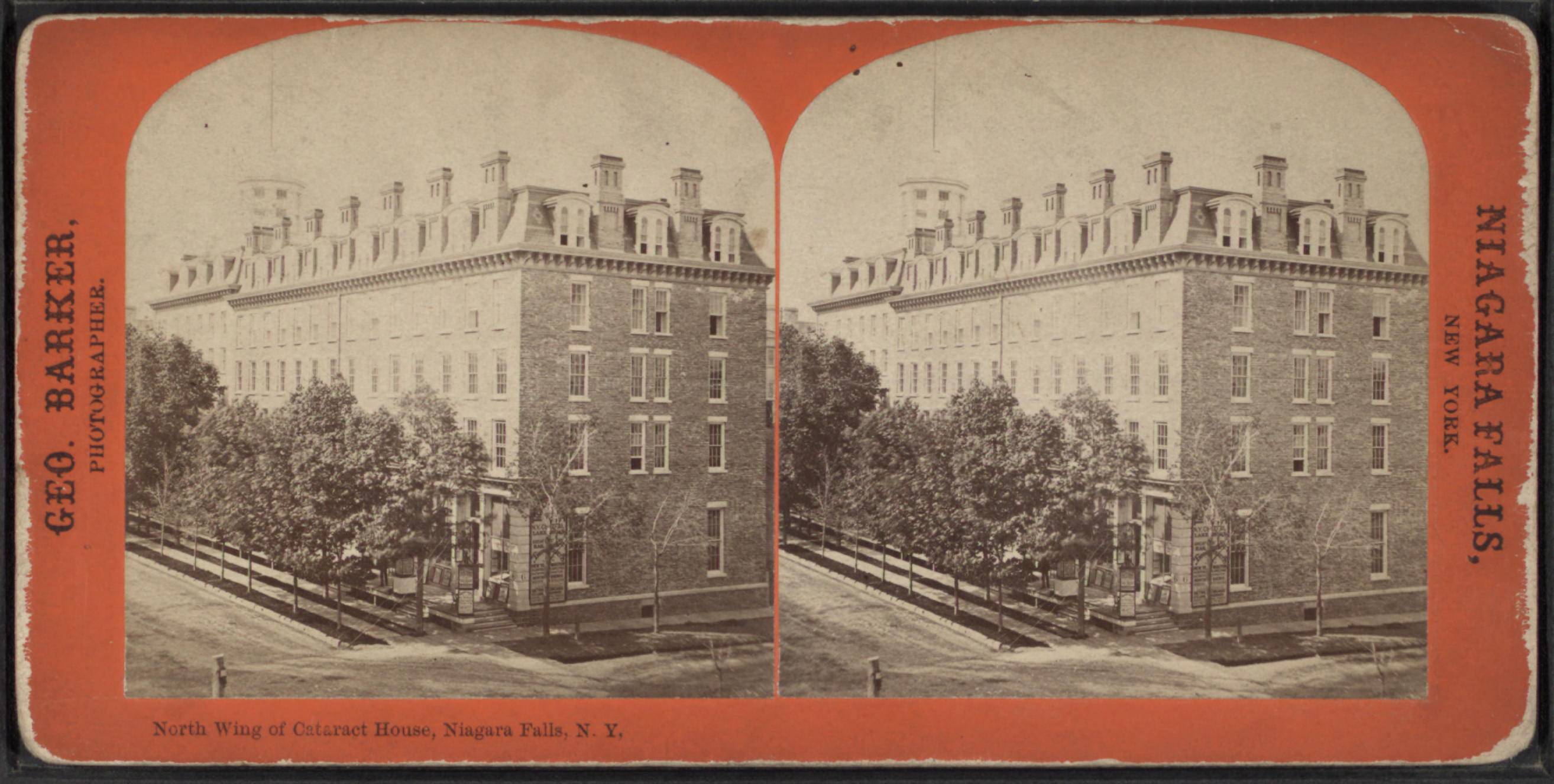
North wing of Cataract House, 1844–1894

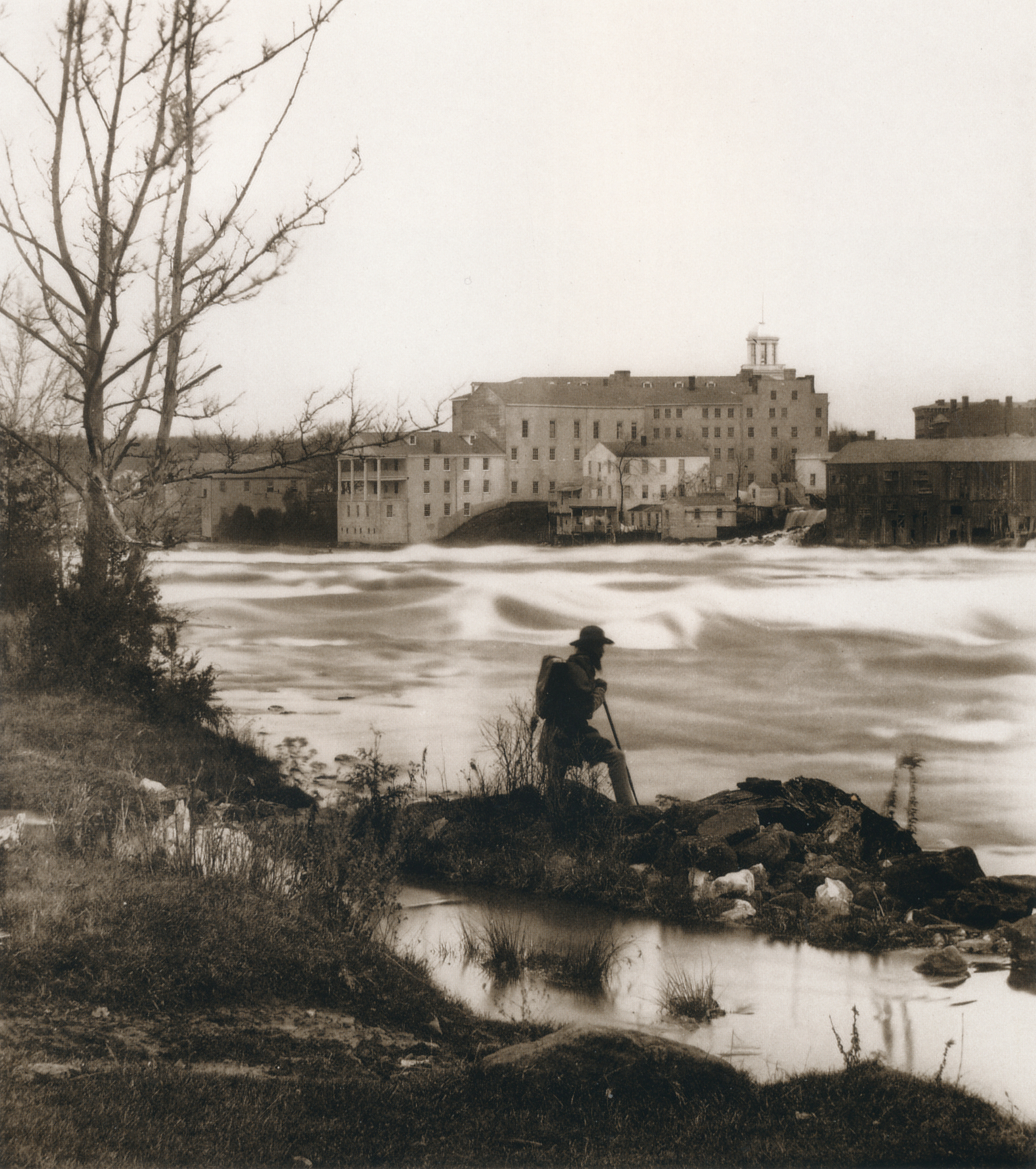
Cataract House from Goat Island, Niagara, N.Y.
