= Independent Republican (United States) =

Political label

In the politics of the United States, Independent Republican is a term occasionally adopted by members of United States Congress to refer to their party affiliation. It is also used at the state level by individuals who loosely identify with the ideals of the national Republican Party but who choose not to formally affiliate with the party (i.e. chooses to be an independent).

Independent Republican is not a political party. Several elected officials, including members of Congress, have identified as Independent Republicans. It has generally been used by members of Congress who have considered themselves to be members of the Republican Party, but who did not receive the nomination of the Republican Party and therefore ran against and defeated the Republican Party's official candidate in the general election. Examples include Thomas S. Butler, who served from 1897 to 1928 from Pennsylvania; Henry K. Porter, who served from 1903 to 1905 from Pennsylvania; and Peter A. Porter, who served from 1907 to 1909 from New York. Lisa Murkowski, who was defeated in the Republican primary by Tea Party-backed Joe Miller, won the United States Senate election in Alaska in 2010 as a write-in candidate, though she did not adopt this label.

Robert Moses, the "master builder" of New York City, described himself as an Independent Republican.

Currently, there is one Independent Republican, Kevin Kiley, in the US House of Representatives.

== See also ==
- Independent-Republican Party of Minnesota
- Independent Democrat, the Democratic Party counterpart
- Miscellaneous right, label used by independent conservative candidates in France
- Independent Conservative, label used by independent conservative candidates in the United Kingdom and Canada
- Independent Liberal, label used by some conservative candidates in Australia
- Republican in name only (RINO)
