= Whitney Mansion (Niagara Falls, New York) =

Historic house in New York, United States

- U.S. National Register of Historic Places
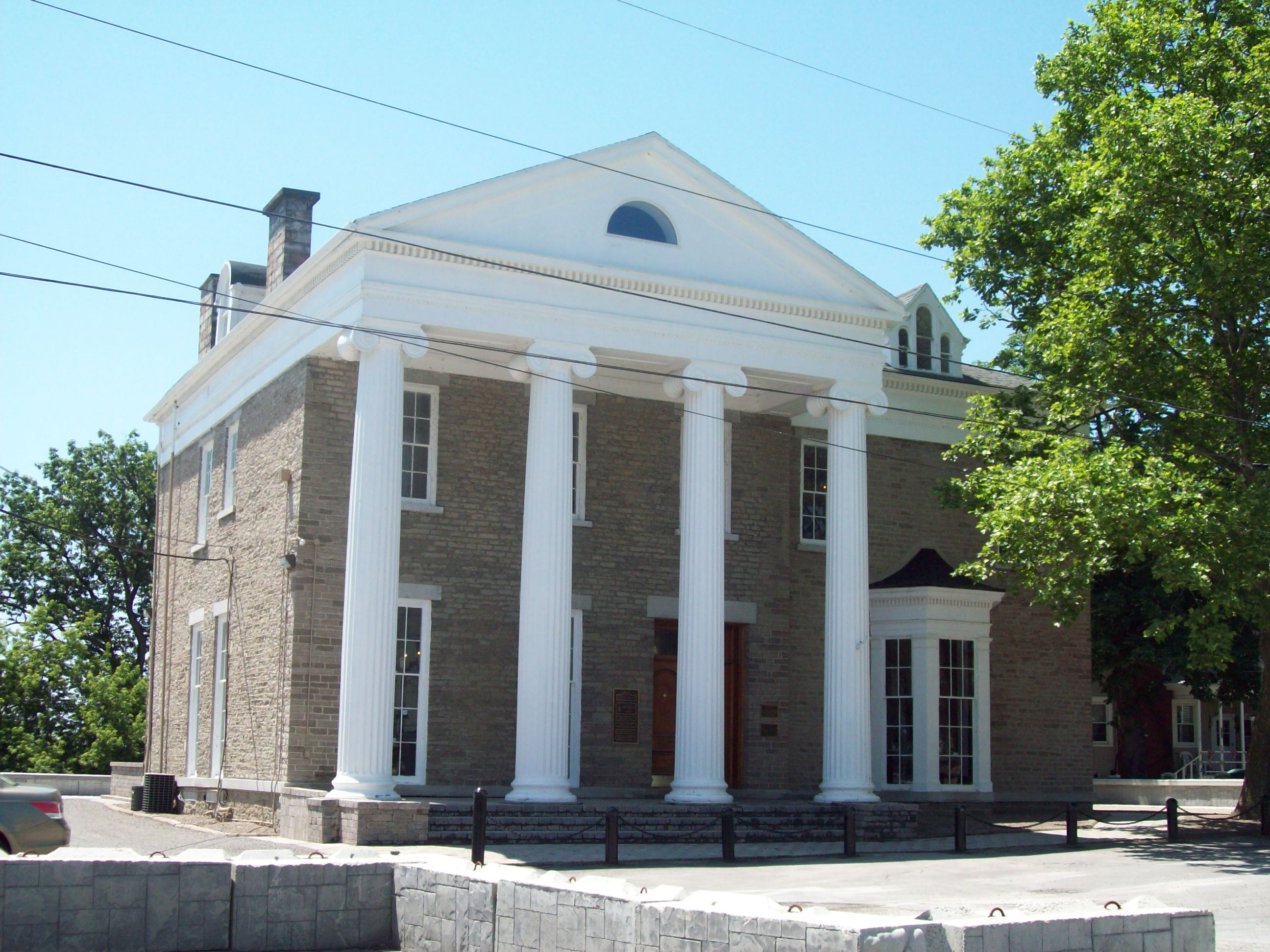
- Whitney Mansion, June 2009

- Location within New York Location within the United States
- Location: 335 Buffalo Ave., Niagara Falls, New York
- Coordinates: 43°4′54″N 79°3′31″W
- Built: 1849
- Architectural style: Greek Revival
- NRHP reference No.: 74001283
- Added to NRHP: January 17, 1974

Whitney Mansion is a historic home located at Niagara Falls in Niagara County, New York. It is a two-story Greek Revival stone structure built in 1849 by the son of General Parkhurst Whitney, a village founder and owner of the Cataract House and The Eagle Tavern. The structure features a two-story pedimented porch with four heavy Ionic columns. It is located overlooking the Niagara River, just above the American Falls. It now contains law offices.

It was listed on the National Register of Historic Places in 1974.
