= Samuel DeVeaux =

US public official

Samuel DeVeaux (1789–1852) was a public official in Western New York.

Born in New York City in 1789 of Huguenot descent, DeVeaux began his career at the land office in Canandaigua, New York in 1803 and moved to the Niagara area to work as commissary at Fort Niagara in 1807.

Deveaux became a co-owner of a store in Lockport, New York after the War of 1812 and was postmaster of LeRoy, New York from 1813 to 1815. Returning to Niagara County in 1815, DeVeaux acquired various tracts of land (including land later used for the Cataract House), became school commissioner in 1819, Justice of the Peace in 1821. In 1847 DeVeaux became a member of the Lockport and Niagara Railway and member of the board of the International Suspension Bridge in 1848. DeVeaux died in 1852, he was predeceased by his wife Maria in 1815. DeVeaux is buried at Saint David's United Methodist Cemetery in Niagara-on-the-Lake, Ontario.

== Legacy ==
- DeVeaux College - established on his estate in 1855 and closed in 1972. Site now Deveaux School Historic District
- DeVeaux Woods State Park - built of site of DeVeaux College for Orphans and Destitute Children (see DeVeaux College) and became a state park in 2001
