= Niagara Falls Underground Railroad Heritage Center =

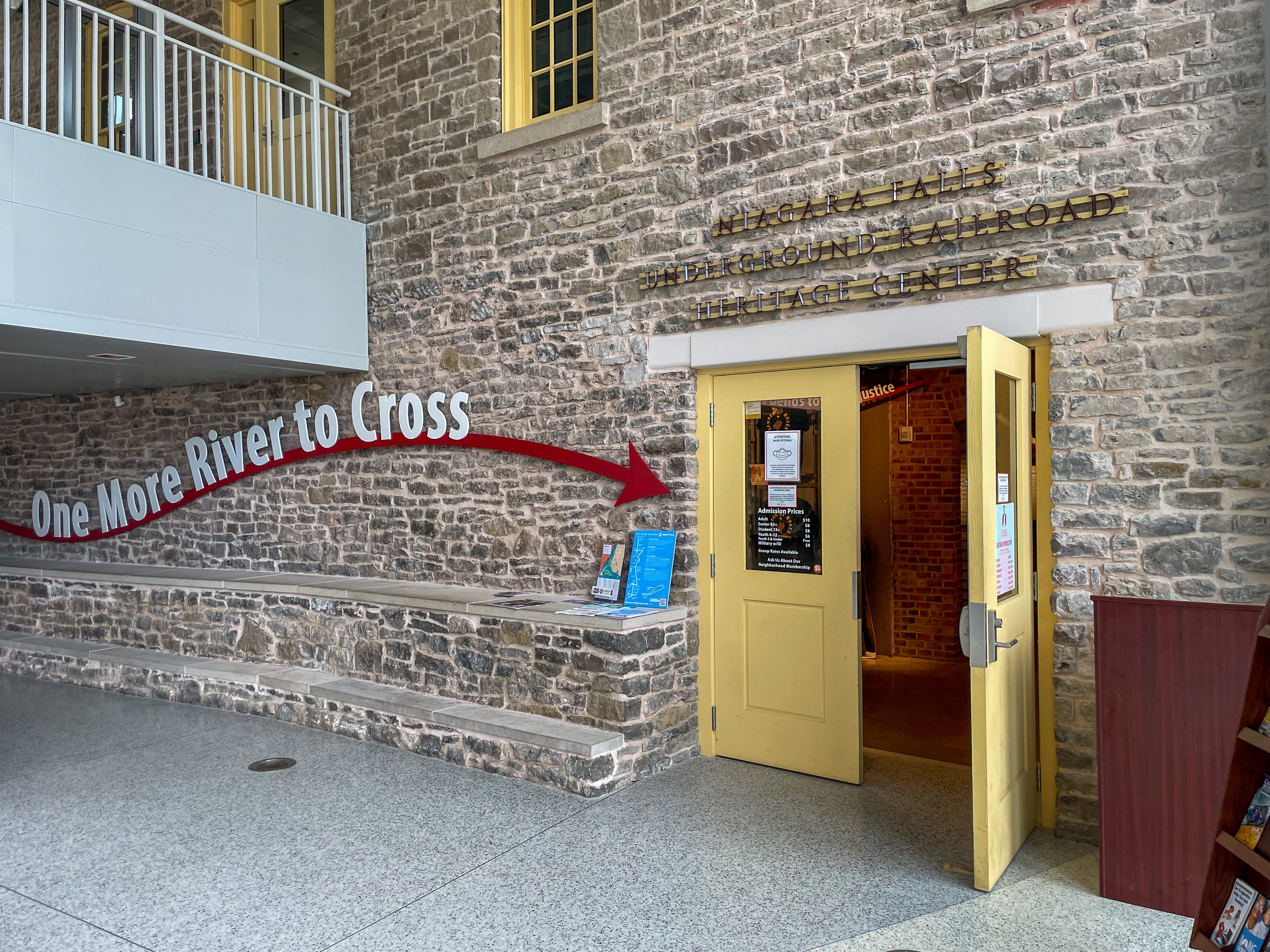
- Entrance
- Established: 2018
- Location: Niagara Falls, New York
- Type: African American history
- Director: Ally Spongr
- Public transit access: Amtrak (Niagara Falls Station and Customhouse Interpretive Center); NFTA Route 50; Discover Niagara
- Website: niagarafallsundergroundrailroad.org

The Niagara Falls Underground Railroad Heritage Center is a museum in Niagara Falls, New York, based on the history and legacy of the Underground Railroad. Opened in 2018, it is located on the first floor of a historic former U.S. Customhouse built in 1863 at the Niagara Falls Station and Customhouse Interpretive Center.

== History ==
The idea of commemorating the Underground Railroad in Niagara Falls picked up steam in 2007 when former City Council Chairman Charles A. Walker and Kevin E. Cottrell pitched an idea they called "North Star on North Main." Funding from New York State began in 2008, when the State Legislature created the Niagara Falls Underground Railroad Heritage Commission to work on an Underground Railroad museum in Niagara Falls. The following year, a state law governing Niagara Falls' use of Seneca Niagara Casino money was amended to give the commission $350,000 a year, a figure that was reduced to $200,000 a year in 2011.

Opened on May 4, 2018, the museum is sanctioned by the National Park Service as part of the Niagara Falls National Heritage Area and is operated in a partnership between the National Park Service and the Niagara Falls Underground Railroad Heritage Commission.

== Exhibits ==
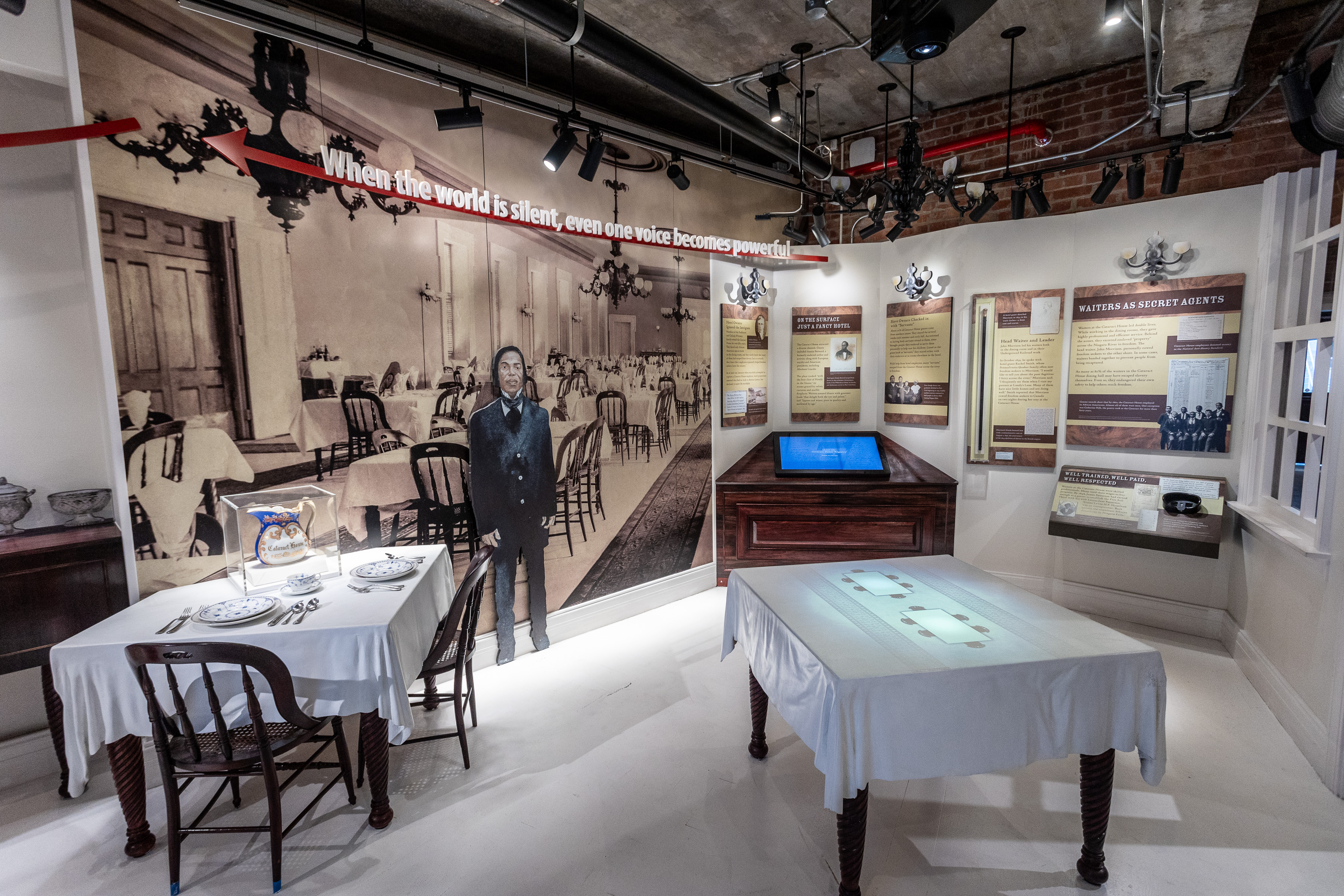
Exhibit about the Cataract House hotel, a stop on the Underground Railroad

Described as an experiential museum, the museum includes such exhibits as "One More River to Cross" featuring the history of the Underground Railroad in Niagara Falls, the role played by the location and geography of Niagara Falls, and the actions of residents particularly African-American residents. Other exhibits include a recreation of the Cataract House, a Niagara Falls hotel that employed an entirely African-American wait staff, who helped numbers of enslaved people to freedom in Canada and a recreation of the International Suspension Bridge, built in 1848, and rebuilt in 1855 to incorporate rail traffic, where Harriet Tubman and other freedom seekers crossed into Canada.

In 2019, "One More River to Cross" won an Award of Excellence by the American Association for State and Local History (AASLH).

== See also ==
- List of museums focused on African Americans
