= Little Italy, Niagara Falls, New York =

Little Italy is a neighborhood located in Niagara Falls, New York.

== Geography ==
Little Italy is a Little Italy-style neighborhood district located along Pine Avenue from Main Street to Hyde Park Boulevard within the city of Niagara Falls.

The district is surrounded by residential homes and a number of non-Italian businesses.

== History ==
Little Italy was historically the home to a large Italian-American population, with Italian Americans building such institutions as St. Joseph's Church, the Cristoforo Colombo Society, and Columbus Square Park. The park serves as the center of Italian culture with its bocce courts, summer concerts and the annual Niagara Falls Italian Festival, which runs in late March.
