= Niagara Falls, New York =

Niagara Falls
- City
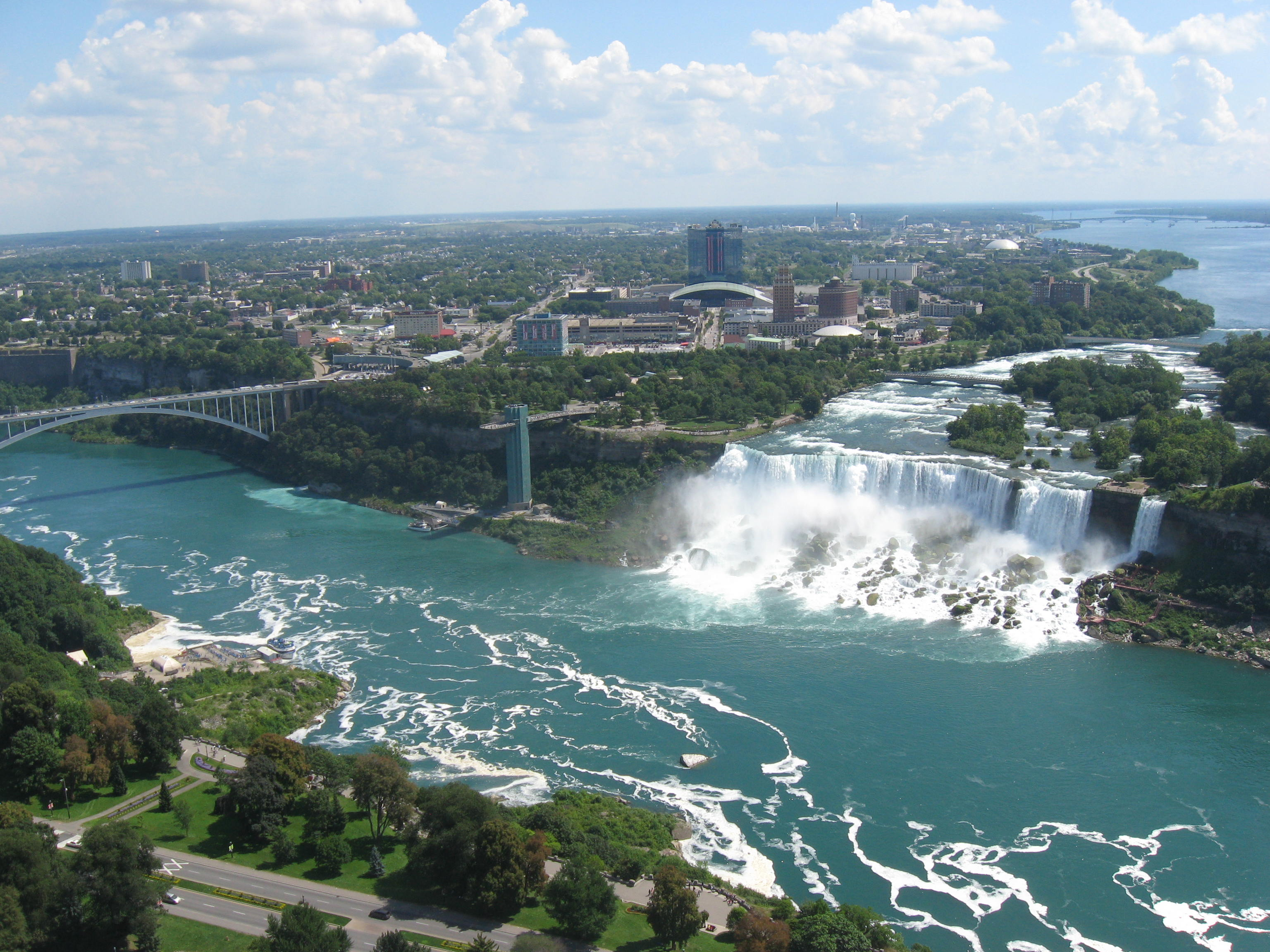
- The city of Niagara Falls viewed from the Skylon Tower. In the foreground are the American Falls (left) and Bridal Veil Falls (right).

- Flag Seal
- Nicknames: Niagara Falls USA; Honeymoon Capital of the World; Cataract City; The Falls
- Interactive map of Niagara Falls
- Location in New York (state) Location within the United States
- Coordinates: 43°6′N 79°1′W
- Country: United States
- State: New York
- County: Niagara
- Settled: 1679; 347 years ago
- Incorporated as a city: March 17, 1892; 134 years ago

Government
  - Type: Strong mayor-council
  - Mayor: Robert Restaino (D)
  - City Administrator: Anthony Restaino
  - City Council: Members' List: • David Zajac (R); • Donta Myles (D); • James Perry (D) Chairman; • Traci Bax (R); • Brian Archie (D)

Area
  - City: 16.83 sq mi (43.58 km^{2})
  - Land: 14.09 sq mi (36.48 km^{2})
  - Water: 2.74 sq mi (7.10 km^{2}) 16.37%
  - Urban: 366.7 sq mi (949.7 km^{2})
- Elevation: 614 ft (187 m)

Population (2020)
  - City: 48,671
  - Rank: NY: 34th (2010)
  - Density: 3,455.3/sq mi (1,334.09/km^{2})
  - Urban: 935,906 (US: 46th)
  - Urban density: 2,663.5/sq mi (1,028.37/km^{2})
  - Metro: 1,134,155 (US: 50th)
  - CSA: 1,206,992 (US: 47th)
- Time zone: UTC-5 (EST)
  - Summer (DST): UTC-4 (EDT)
- ZIP codes: 14301-14305
- Area code: 716
- FIPS code: 36-51055
- GNIS feature ID: 0970406
- Demonym: Niagarian; Niagara Fallsite
- Website: niagarafallsusa.org

Niagara Falls is a city in Niagara County, New York, United States. As of the 2020 census, the city had a total population of 48,671. It is adjacent to the Niagara River, across from the city of Niagara Falls, Ontario, and named after the famed Niagara Falls which they share. The city is within the Buffalo–Niagara Falls metropolitan area and the Western New York region.

The city was formerly inhabited by Native Americans. Europeans who migrated to the Niagara Falls in the mid-17th century began to open businesses and develop infrastructure. Later in the 18th and 19th centuries, scientists and businessmen began harnessing the power of the Niagara River for electricity and the city began to attract manufacturers and other businesses drawn by the promise of inexpensive hydroelectric power. After the 1960s, the city and region experienced an economic decline. As industries left the region, affluent and middle-class families relocated from Niagara Falls to other metropolitan areas around the country.

Due to the loss of jobs in the region, especially in the manufacturing sector, the city has gone from over 102,000 residents in 1960 to approximately 48,000 residents in 2020, a population drop of more than 50%.

== History ==
Before Europeans entered the area, it was dominated by the Neutral Nation of Native Americans. European migration into the area began in the 17th century. The first recorded European to visit the area was Frenchman Robert de la Salle, who built Fort Conti at the mouth of the Niagara River early in 1679, with permission from the Iroquois, as a base for boatbuilding; his ship Le Griffon was built on the upper Niagara River at or near Cayuga Creek in the same year. He was accompanied by Belgian priest Louis Hennepin, who was the first known European to see the falls. The influx of newcomers may have been a catalyst for already hostile native tribes to turn to open warfare in competition for the fur trade.

The City of Niagara Falls was incorporated on March 17, 1892, from the villages of Manchester and Suspension Bridge, which were parts of the Town of Niagara. Thomas Vincent Welch, a member of the charter committee and a New York state assemblyman and a second-generation Irish American, persuaded Governor Roswell P. Flower to sign the bill on Saint Patrick's Day. George W. Wright was elected the first mayor of Niagara Falls.

By the end of the 19th century, the city was heavily industrialized, due in part to the power potential offered by the Niagara River. Tourism was considered a secondary niche, while manufacturing of petrochemicals, abrasives, metallurgical products and other materials was the main producer of jobs and attracted a large number of workers, many of whom were immigrants.

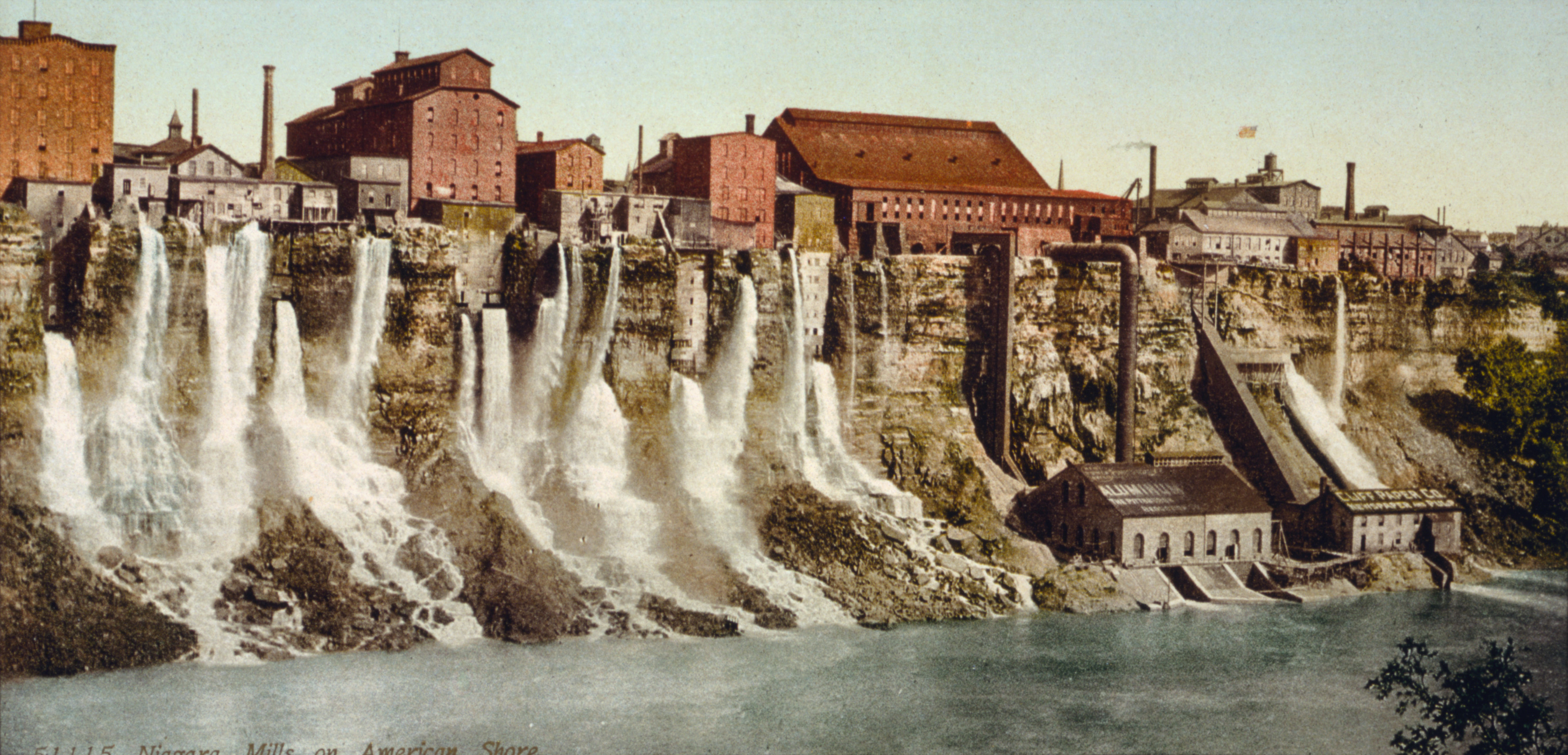
The Niagara Falls mill district downriver from the American Falls, 1900

In 1927, the city annexed the village of La Salle, named for Robert de la Salle, from the Town of Niagara.

Industry and tourism grew steadily throughout the first half of the 20th century due to a high demand for industrial products and the increased mobility of people to travel. Paper, rubber, plastics, petrochemicals, carbon insulators and abrasives were among the city's major industries. This prosperity would end by the late 1960s as aging industrial plants moved to less expensive locations. In addition, the falls were incompatible with modern shipping technology.

In 1956, the Schoellkopf Power Plant on the lower river just downstream of the American Falls was critically damaged by the collapse of the Niagara Gorge wall above it. This prompted the planning and construction of one of the largest hydroelectric plants to be built in North America to that time, generating a large influx of workers and families to the area. New York City urban planner Robert Moses built the new power plant in nearby Lewiston, New York. Much of the power generated there fueled growing demands for power in downstate New York and New York City.

In 1978, the neighborhood of Love Canal gained national media attention when toxic waste contamination from a chemical landfill beneath it forced United States President Jimmy Carter to declare a state of emergency, the first such presidential declaration made for a non-natural disaster. Hundreds of residents were evacuated from the area, many of whom were ill because of exposure to chemical waste.

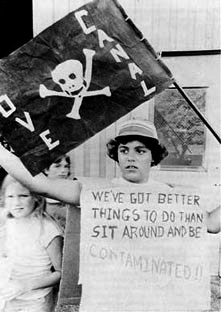
The contaminated neighborhood of Love Canal received national attention in 1978.

After the Love Canal disaster, the city—which had already been declining in population for nearly two decades—experienced accelerated economic and political difficulties. The costs of manufacturing elsewhere had become less expensive, which led to the closure of several factories. The city's population eventually dropped by more than half of its peak, as workers fled the city in search of jobs elsewhere. Then, much like the nearby city of Buffalo, the city's economy plummeted when a failed urban renewal project destroyed Falls Street and the tourist district.

In 2001, the leadership of Laborers Local 91 was found guilty of extortion, racketeering and other crimes following an exposé by Mike Hudson of the Niagara Falls Reporter. Union boss Michael "Butch" Quarcini died before trial, while the rest of the union leadership was sentenced to prison.

In early 2010, former Niagara Falls Mayor Vincenzo Anello was indicted on federal charges of corruption, alleging the mayor accepted $40,000 in loans from a businessman who was later awarded a no-bid lease on city property. The charges were dropped as part of a plea deal after Anello pleaded guilty to unrelated charges of pension fraud, regarding a pension from the International Brotherhood of Electrical Workers, of which he is a member. He was sentenced to 10 to 16 months in prison.

The city's decline received national exposure from Bloomberg Businessweek in 2010.

In November 2010, the New York State Attorney General entered into an agreement with the city and its police department to create new policies to govern police practices in response to claims of excessive force and police misconduct. The city committed to create policies and procedures to prevent and respond to allegations of excessive force, and to ensure police are properly trained and complaints are properly investigated. Prior claims filed by residents will be evaluated by an independent panel.

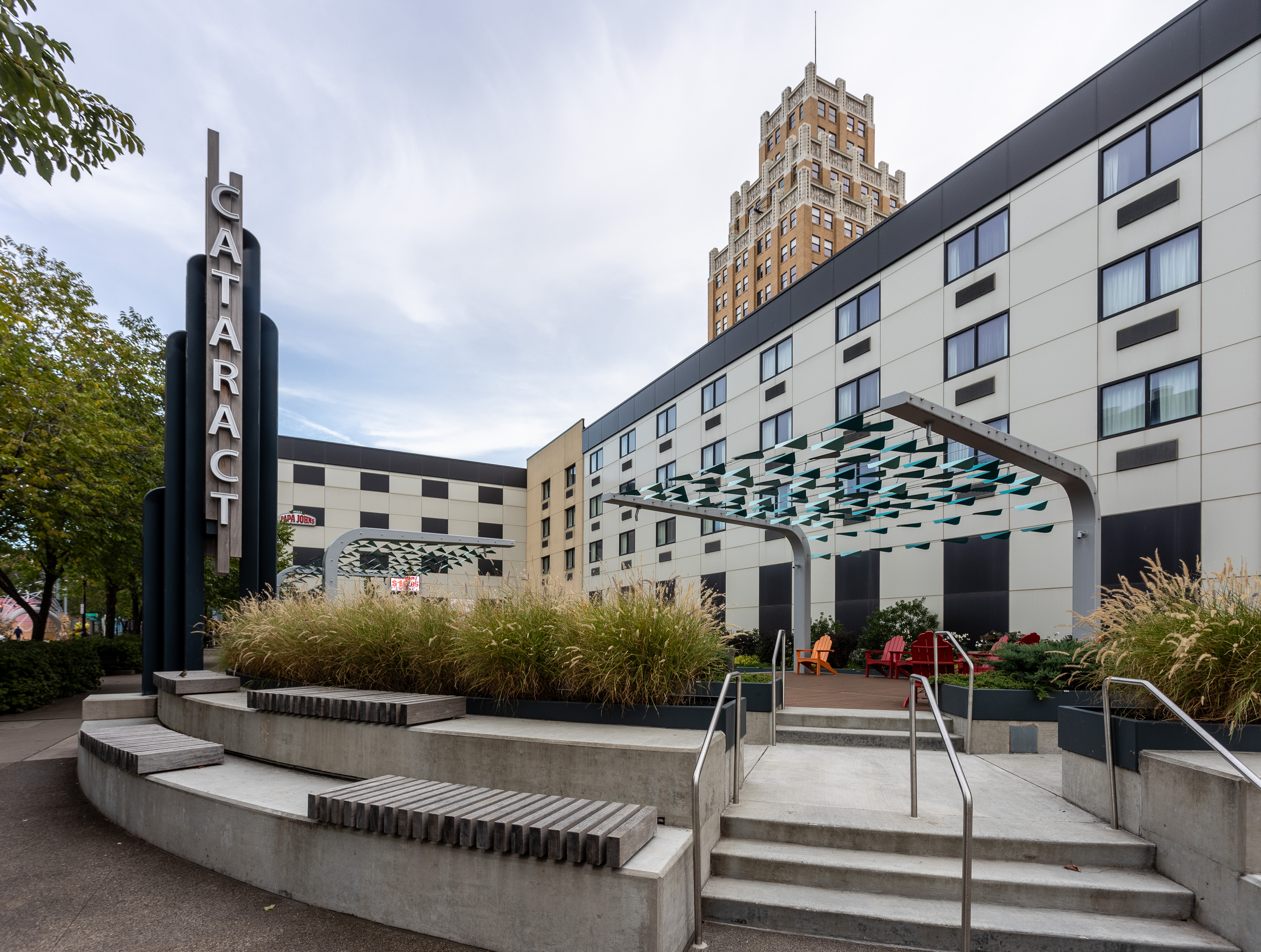
Cataract Commons

In 2020, a public square named "Cataract Commons" opened on Old Falls Street. It is a public space for outdoor events and activities.

The city has multiple properties on the National Register of Historic Places. It also has three national historic districts, including Chilton Avenue-Orchard Parkway Historic District, Deveaux School Historic District and the Park Place Historic District.

== Geography ==
Niagara Falls is at the international boundary between the United States and Canada. The city is within the Buffalo–Niagara Falls metropolitan area and is approximately 16 miles (26 km) from Buffalo, New York.

The city has an area of 16.9 square miles (44 km^{2}), of which 14.1 square miles (37 km^{2}) (83.43%) is land and 2.8 square miles (7.3 km^{2}) (16.57%) is water. The city is built along the Niagara Falls and the Niagara Gorge, which is next to the Niagara River.

=== Climate ===
Niagara Falls has a humid continental climate (Dfa/Dfb under the Köppen climate classification, Dca/Dcb under Trewartha). Different weather stations show that some parts of the city have a hemiboreal climate with average summer temperatures slightly under 22 °C, and others with a hot-summer continental climate with slightly hotter summers. The city has cold, snowy winters and very warm, humid summers. Precipitation is moderate and consistent in all seasons, falling equally or more as snow during the winter.

The city has snowier than average winters compared to most cities in the US, however less than many other cities in Upstate New York including nearby Buffalo and Rochester. Thaw cycles with temperatures above 32 °F (0 °C) are a common occurrence. The hottest and coldest temperatures recorded in the decade to 2015 were 97 °F (36 °C) in 2005 and −13 °F (−25 °C) in 2003, respectively. 38% of warm season precipitation falls in the form of a thunderstorm.

Climate data for Niagara Falls International Airport (1991–2020 normals, extremes 1951–present)
| Month | Jan | Feb | Mar | Apr | May | Jun | Jul | Aug | Sep | Oct | Nov | Dec | Year |
|---|---|---|---|---|---|---|---|---|---|---|---|---|---|
| Record high °F (°C) | 65 (18) | 68 (20) | 81 (27) | 86 (30) | 93 (34) | 95 (35) | 97 (36) | 95 (35) | 96 (36) | 85 (29) | 80 (27) | 72 (22) | 97 (36) |
| Mean maximum °F (°C) | 54.1 (12.3) | 51.1 (10.6) | 64.5 (18.1) | 78.9 (26.1) | 85.8 (29.9) | 88.8 (31.6) | 91.3 (32.9) | 89.1 (31.7) | 87.0 (30.6) | 78.2 (25.7) | 66.4 (19.1) | 56.2 (13.4) | 92.3 (33.5) |
| Mean daily maximum °F (°C) | 31.5 (−0.3) | 32.7 (0.4) | 41.4 (5.2) | 54.5 (12.5) | 67.6 (19.8) | 76.3 (24.6) | 80.7 (27.1) | 79.1 (26.2) | 72.5 (22.5) | 59.5 (15.3) | 47.4 (8.6) | 36.7 (2.6) | 56.7 (13.7) |
| Daily mean °F (°C) | 24.2 (−4.3) | 25.0 (−3.9) | 33.0 (0.6) | 44.4 (6.9) | 56.6 (13.7) | 66.3 (19.1) | 71.0 (21.7) | 69.4 (20.8) | 62.3 (16.8) | 50.6 (10.3) | 39.7 (4.3) | 30.2 (−1.0) | 47.7 (8.7) |
| Mean daily minimum °F (°C) | 16.8 (−8.4) | 17.3 (−8.2) | 24.7 (−4.1) | 34.3 (1.3) | 45.7 (7.6) | 56.2 (13.4) | 61.2 (16.2) | 59.6 (15.3) | 52.2 (11.2) | 41.6 (5.3) | 31.9 (−0.1) | 23.7 (−4.6) | 38.8 (3.7) |
| Mean minimum °F (°C) | −1.3 (−18.5) | −0.2 (−17.9) | 7.4 (−13.7) | 23.3 (−4.8) | 32.5 (0.3) | 44.6 (7.0) | 51.7 (10.9) | 50.2 (10.1) | 40.8 (4.9) | 28.7 (−1.8) | 18.9 (−7.3) | 8.4 (−13.1) | −5.2 (−20.7) |
| Record low °F (°C) | −16 (−27) | −13 (−25) | −8 (−22) | 12 (−11) | 24 (−4) | 37 (3) | 46 (8) | 45 (7) | 30 (−1) | 23 (−5) | −2 (−19) | −4 (−20) | −16 (−27) |
| Average precipitation inches (mm) | 2.27 (58) | 1.77 (45) | 2.12 (54) | 3.19 (81) | 3.03 (77) | 2.88 (73) | 3.37 (86) | 2.62 (67) | 3.27 (83) | 3.23 (82) | 2.78 (71) | 2.44 (62) | 32.97 (837) |
| Average precipitation days (≥ 0.01 in) | 15.0 | 12.5 | 12.1 | 13.4 | 12.8 | 11.6 | 11.5 | 10.5 | 10.8 | 15.3 | 12.6 | 15.5 | 153.6 |
Source 1: NOAA
Source 2: National Weather Service

Climate data for Niagara Falls, New York (1991–2020 normals, extremes 1989–2019)
| Month | Jan | Feb | Mar | Apr | May | Jun | Jul | Aug | Sep | Oct | Nov | Dec | Year |
|---|---|---|---|---|---|---|---|---|---|---|---|---|---|
| Record high °F (°C) | 65 (18) | 70 (21) | 81 (27) | 93 (34) | 93 (34) | 95 (35) | 97 (36) | 95 (35) | 93 (34) | 85 (29) | 72 (22) | 72 (22) | 97 (36) |
| Mean daily maximum °F (°C) | 33.4 (0.8) | 34.5 (1.4) | 42.9 (6.1) | 55.8 (13.2) | 68.8 (20.4) | 77.6 (25.3) | 82.2 (27.9) | 80.4 (26.9) | 73.9 (23.3) | 61.2 (16.2) | 48.9 (9.4) | 38.5 (3.6) | 58.2 (14.6) |
| Daily mean °F (°C) | 26.0 (−3.3) | 26.7 (−2.9) | 34.4 (1.3) | 45.9 (7.7) | 58.3 (14.6) | 68.0 (20.0) | 72.8 (22.7) | 70.9 (21.6) | 63.7 (17.6) | 52.0 (11.1) | 41.2 (5.1) | 32.0 (0.0) | 49.3 (9.6) |
| Mean daily minimum °F (°C) | 18.6 (−7.4) | 18.8 (−7.3) | 26.0 (−3.3) | 36.0 (2.2) | 47.9 (8.8) | 58.3 (14.6) | 63.4 (17.4) | 61.4 (16.3) | 53.6 (12.0) | 42.8 (6.0) | 33.4 (0.8) | 25.4 (−3.7) | 40.5 (4.7) |
| Record low °F (°C) | −15 (−26) | −13 (−25) | −9 (−23) | 14 (−10) | 28 (−2) | 38 (3) | 44 (7) | 44 (7) | 26 (−3) | 24 (−4) | 7 (−14) | −7 (−22) | −15 (−26) |
| Average precipitation inches (mm) | 2.59 (66) | 2.10 (53) | 2.44 (62) | 3.10 (79) | 3.14 (80) | 2.99 (76) | 3.38 (86) | 2.80 (71) | 3.25 (83) | 3.27 (83) | 2.89 (73) | 2.76 (70) | 34.71 (882) |
| Average snowfall inches (cm) | 22.3 (57) | 16.3 (41) | 11.6 (29) | 2.2 (5.6) | 0.0 (0.0) | 0.0 (0.0) | 0.0 (0.0) | 0.0 (0.0) | 0.0 (0.0) | 0.2 (0.51) | 4.1 (10) | 15.7 (40) | 72.4 (184) |
| Average precipitation days (≥ 0.01 in) | 18.4 | 14.7 | 13.3 | 13.4 | 12.7 | 11.3 | 10.7 | 10.4 | 10.3 | 13.7 | 13.3 | 16.2 | 158.4 |
| Average snowy days (≥ 0.1 in) | 14.6 | 12.1 | 7.3 | 2.4 | 0.0 | 0.0 | 0.0 | 0.0 | 0.0 | 0.2 | 3.9 | 10.3 | 50.8 |
Source: NOAA

=== Neighborhoods ===
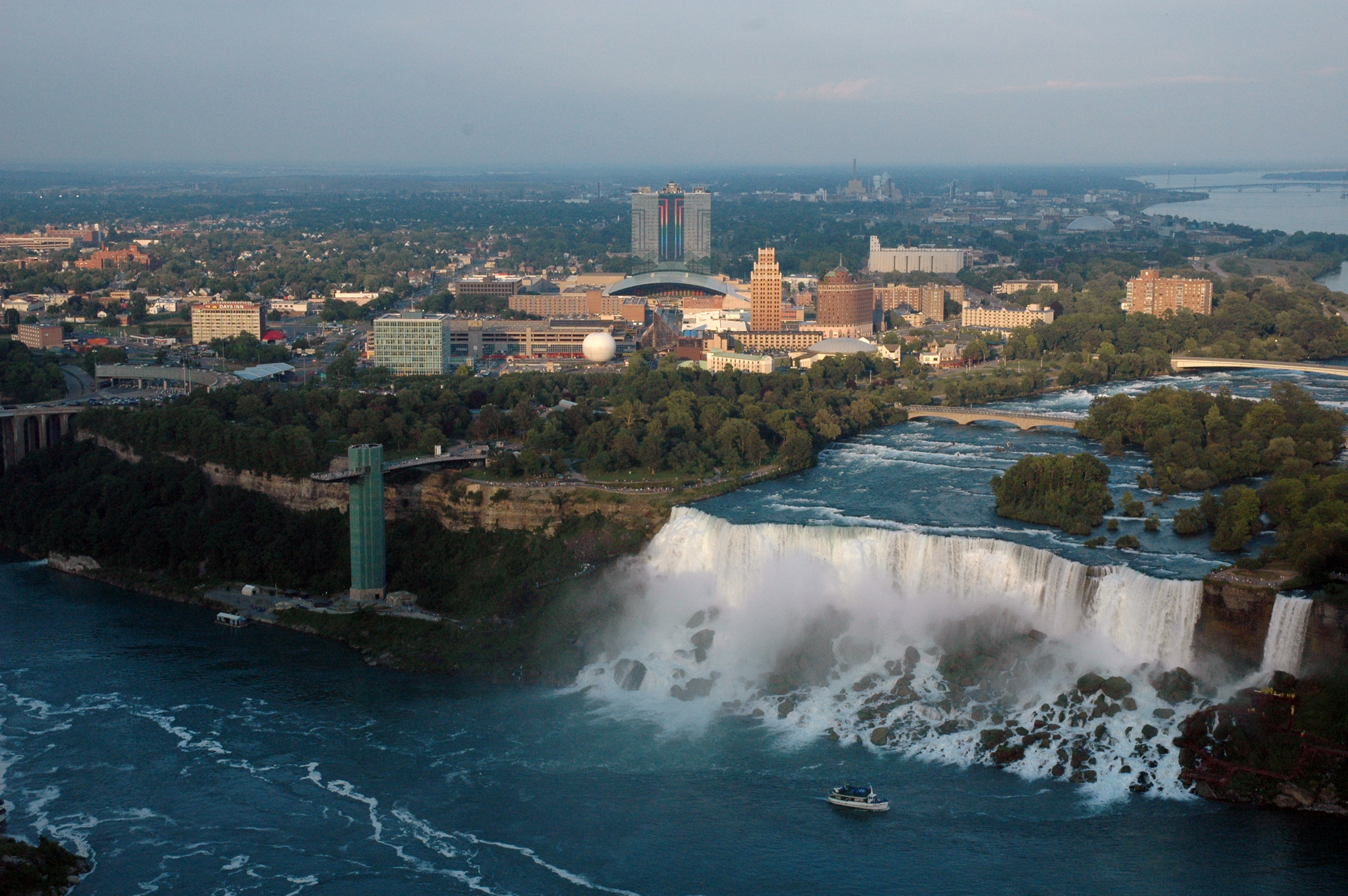
The American Falls and the Downtown area of Niagara Falls, New York, seen from Skylon Tower in 2007

- Buffalo Avenue – runs along the south end along the Niagara River once home to a vast number of old families with architecturally significant mansions; further east (past John Daly Boulevard) the street is surrounded by a number of industrial sites to 56th Street before returning to a residential area and ending at the Love Canal area at 102nd Street.
- Central District
- Deveaux – Located in the northwestern corner (west of the North End) along the Niagara River is residential area built in the 1920s to 1940s. Named for Judge Samuel DeVeaux who left his estate to be established as the Deveaux College for Orphans and Destitute Children in 1853 (closed 1971), now the site of DeVeaux Woods State Park and DeVeaux School Historical District.
- Downtown – Area around the Falls and home to hotels including Seneca Niagara Resort Casino, Niagara Falls State Park, Niagara Falls Culinary Institute (formerly Rainbow Centre Factory Outlet)
- East Side – the area bounded by the gorge on the west, Niagara Street on the south, Ontario Avenue on the North and Main Street (NY Rt 104) on the east.
- Hyde Park – Located near the namesake Hyde Park next to Little Italy as well as home to Hyde Park Municipal Golf Course.
- LaSalle – Bounded by 80th Street, Niagara Falls Boulevard, Cayuga Drive and LaSalle Expressway was built up in the 1940s to 1960s. Cayuga Island is linked to neighborhood. The actual neighborhood where the Love Canal was to be built.
- Little Italy – home to a once predominately Italian community that runs along Pine Avenue from Main Street to Hyde Park Boulevard
- Love Canal – Established in the 1950s on land acquired from Hooker Chemical Company. Most of the neighborhood was evacuated in the 1980s after toxic waste was discovered underground. Resettlement began in 1990.
- Niagara Street – residential area east of Downtown along Niagara Street (distinct from Niagara Ave.) once home to a predominately German and Polish community.
- North End – runs along Highland Avenue in the north end of the city before it merges with Hyde Park Boulevard.

== Demographics ==
Historical population
| Census | Pop. | Note | %± |
|---|---|---|---|
| 1870 | 3,006 | | — |
| 1880 | 3,320 | | 10.4% |
| 1890 | 5,502 | | 65.7% |
| 1900 | 19,457 | | 253.6% |
| 1910 | 30,445 | | 56.5% |
| 1920 | 50,760 | | 66.7% |
| 1930 | 74,460 | | 46.7% |
| 1940 | 78,020 | | 4.8% |
| 1950 | 90,872 | | 16.5% |
| 1960 | 102,394 | | 12.7% |
| 1970 | 85,615 | | −16.4% |
| 1980 | 71,384 | | −16.6% |
| 1990 | 61,840 | | −13.4% |
| 2000 | 55,593 | | −10.1% |
| 2010 | 50,193 | | −9.7% |
| 2020 | 48,671 | | −3.0% |
U.S. Decennial Census

=== 2020 census ===
As of the 2020 census, Niagara Falls had a population of 48,671 residents, less than half its 1960 peak of 102,000. The median age was 39.7 years. 21.9% of residents were under the age of 18 and 16.9% of residents were 65 years of age or older. For every 100 females there were 91.9 males, and for every 100 females age 18 and over there were 89.5 males age 18 and over.

100.0% of residents lived in urban areas, while 0.0% lived in rural areas.

There were 21,927 households in Niagara Falls, of which 25.3% had children under the age of 18 living in them. Of all households, 26.8% were married-couple households, 25.6% were households with a male householder and no spouse or partner present, and 38.2% were households with a female householder and no spouse or partner present. About 39.2% of all households were made up of individuals and 14.4% had someone living alone who was 65 years of age or older.

There were 25,471 housing units, of which 13.9% were vacant. The homeowner vacancy rate was 2.4% and the rental vacancy rate was 10.6%.

Racial composition as of the 2020 census
| Race | Number | Percent |
|---|---|---|
| White | 29,719 | 61.1% |
| Black or African American | 11,954 | 24.6% |
| American Indian and Alaska Native | 852 | 1.8% |
| Asian | 1,013 | 2.1% |
| Native Hawaiian and Other Pacific Islander | 10 | 0.0% |
| Some other race | 1,049 | 2.2% |
| Two or more races | 4,074 | 8.4% |
| Hispanic or Latino (of any race) | 2,624 | 5.4% |

=== 2010 census ===
In the 2010 census, there were 50,193 people, 22,603 households, and 12,495 families residing in the city. The population density was 2,987.7 people per square mile (1,153.5 per square km). There were 26,220 housing units at an average density of 1,560.7 per square mile (602.6/km^{2}). The racial makeup of the city was 70.5% White, 21.6% African American, 1.9% Native American, 1.2% Asian, 0% Pacific Islander, 0.8% from other races, and 3.9% from two or more races. Hispanic or Latino of any race were 3.0% of the population.

There were 22,603 households, out of which 23.9% had children under the age of 18 living with them, 29.8% were married couples living together, 19.7% had a female householder with no husband present, and 44.7% were non-families. 38.1% of all households were made up of individuals, and 13.7% had someone living alone who was 65 years of age or older. The average household size was 2.20 and the average family size was 4.02.

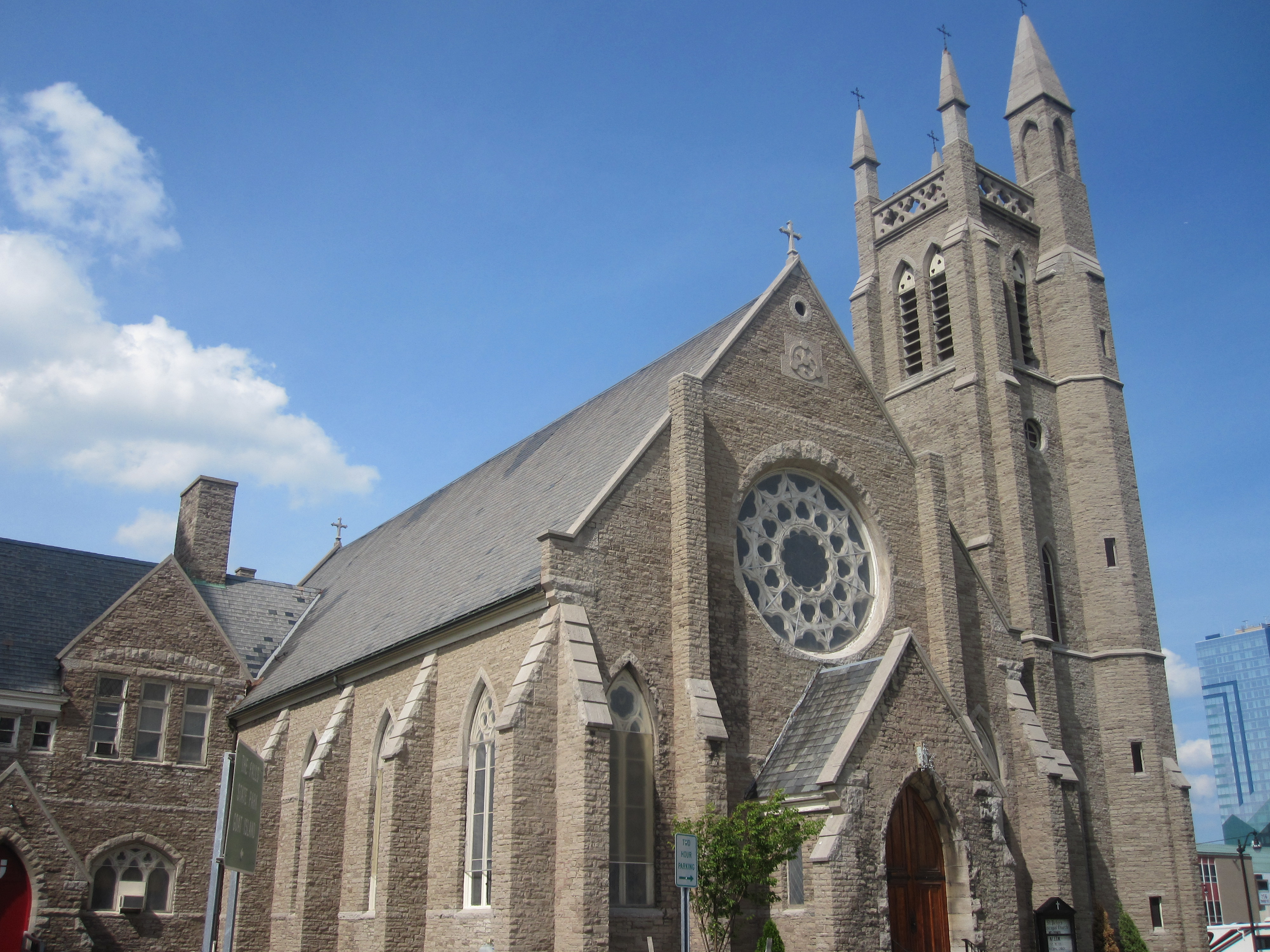
St. Peter's Episcopal Church

In the city, 22% of the population was under the age of 18, 10.1% aged from 18 to 24, 24.2% from 25 to 44, 28.2% from 45 to 64, and 15.5% were 65 years of age or older. The median age was 39 years. For every 100 females, there were 91.2 males. For every 100 females age 18 and over, there were 94.4 males.

The median income for a household in the city was $26,800, and the median income for a family was $34,377. Males had a median income of $31,672 versus $22,124 for females. 23% of the population was below the poverty line.

=== Religion ===
Niagara Falls has a number of places of worship, including the Salvation Army, First Assembly of God Church, First Unitarian Universalist Church of Niagara, St. Peter's Episcopal Church, First Presbyterian Church, St. Theresa Roman Catholic Church in Deveaux, and the Reform Jewish Temple Beth El. The Conservative Jewish Temple Beth Israel closed in 2012.

=== Crime ===
Niagara Falls has high rates of violent and property crime. FBI crime data indicate that the city has among the highest crime rates in New York state. In response to gun violence, volunteer groups such as Operation SNUG mobilized to promote positive community involvement in the troubled areas of the city.

== Economy ==
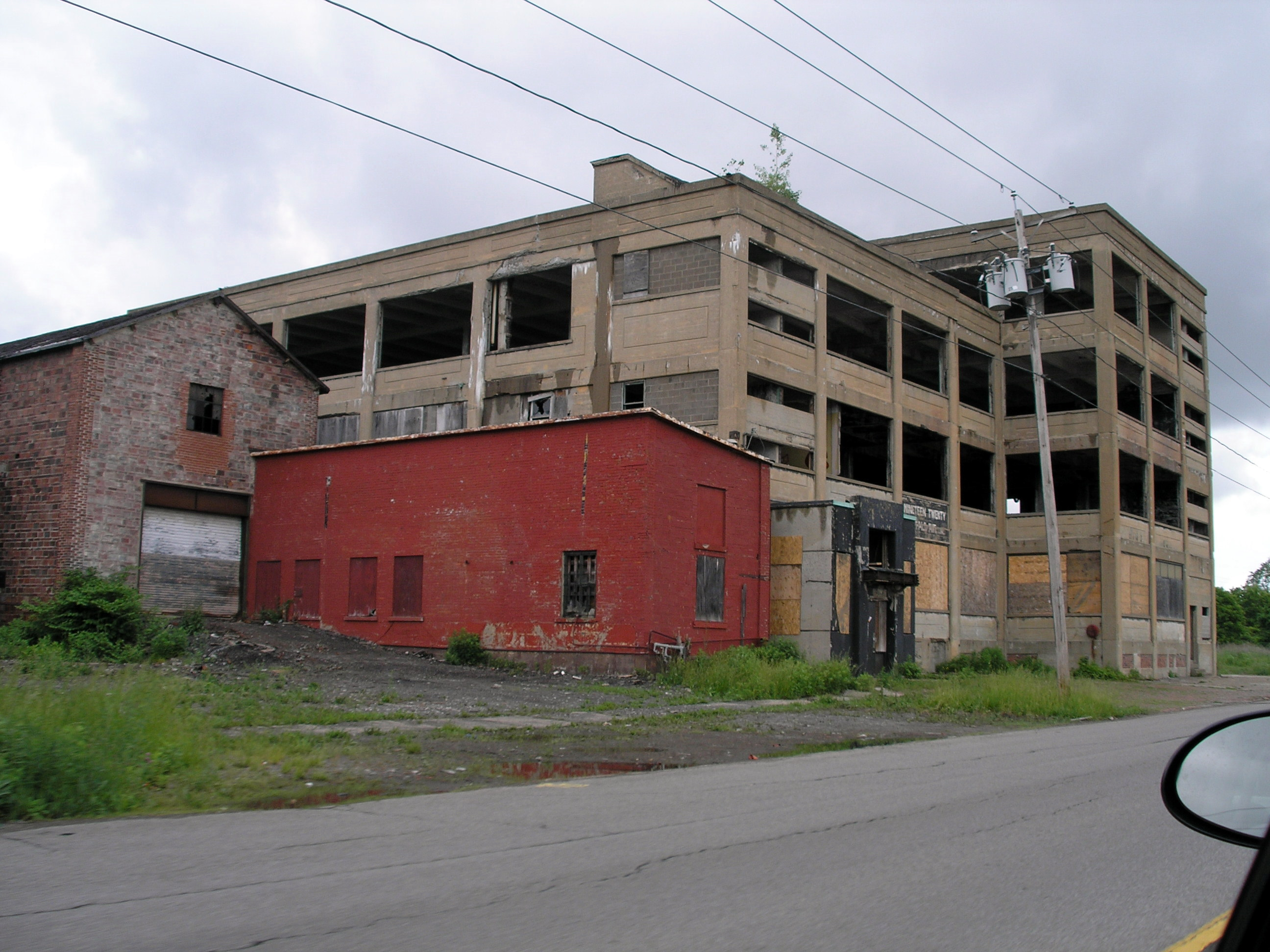
An abandoned industrial building within "Chemical Row" in Niagara Falls

Niagara Falls' main industry is tourism, driven primarily by the waterfalls.

A 2012 profile from the Office of the New York State Comptroller reported that Niagara Falls has "struggled through decades of population losses, rising crime and repeated attempts to reinvent itself from a manufacturing town with some tourism to a major tourist destination." In the 1960s, the city became a boomtown with the opening of the New York State Power Authority's hydroelectric Niagara Power Plant. The cheap electricity produced by the plant generated power for a burgeoning manufacturing industry.

Along with the rest of Western New York, Niagara Falls suffered a significant economic decline from a decline in industry by the 1970s. Today, the city struggles to compete with Niagara Falls, Ontario. The Canadian side has a greater average annual income, a higher average home price, and lower levels of vacant buildings and blight, as well as a more vibrant economy and better tourism infrastructure.

The population of Niagara Falls, New York fell by half from the 1960s to 2012. In contrast, the population of Niagara Falls, Ontario more than tripled. In 2000, the city's median household income was 36% below the national average. In 2012, the city's unemployment rate was significantly higher than the statewide unemployment rate.

Significant sources of economic activity in the region includes the Niagara Falls International Airport, which was renovated in 2009; the Seneca Gaming Corporation's Seneca Niagara Casino & Hotel, which opened in the 2000s respectively; and the nearby Niagara Falls Air Reserve Station.

In late 2001, the State of New York established the USA Niagara Development Corporation, a subsidiary to the State's economic development agency, to focus specifically on facilitating development in the downtown area. However, the organization has been criticized for making little progress and doing little to improve the city's economy.

=== Convention Center ===
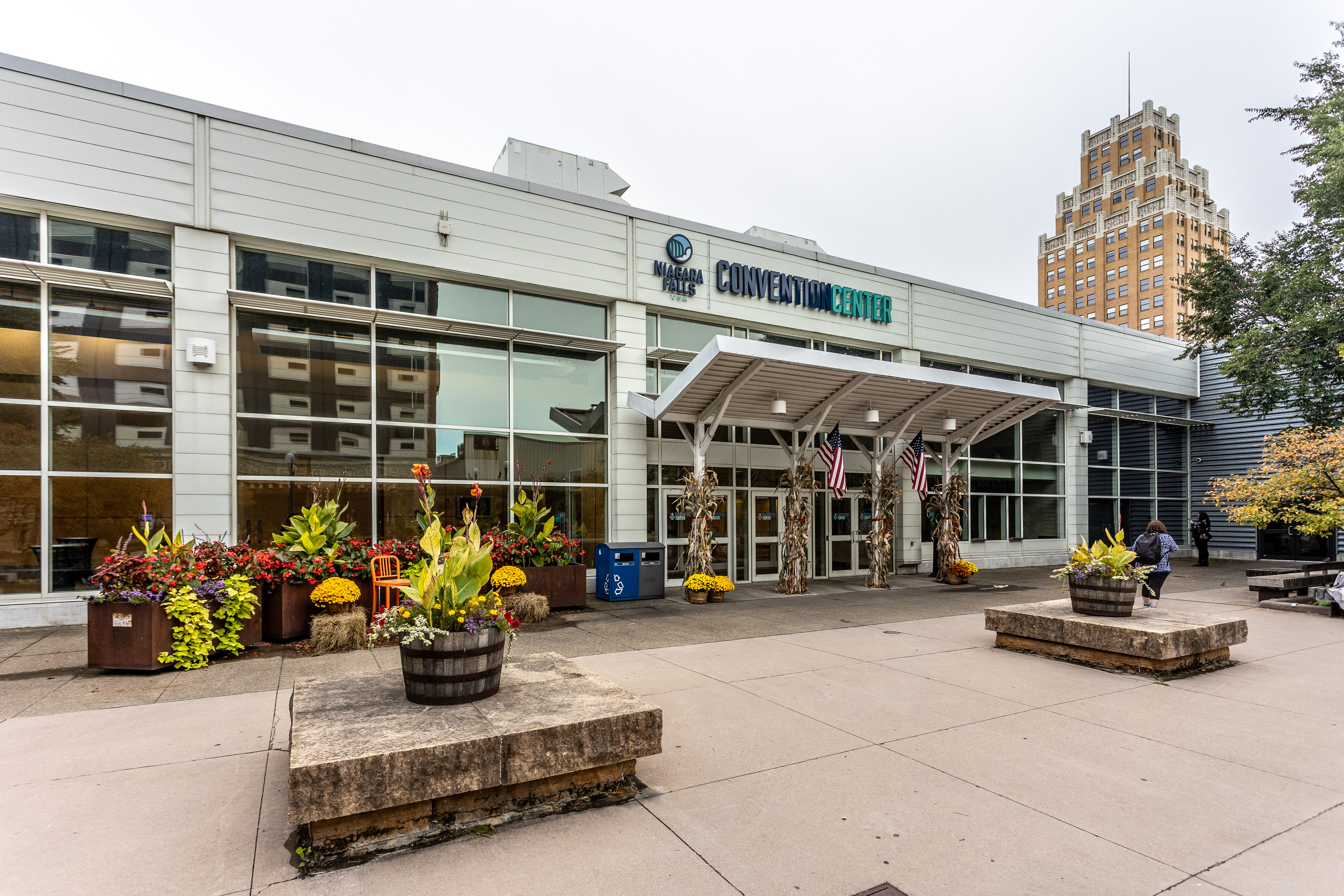
The Niagara Falls Convention Center (NFCC)

From 1973 to 2002, the city had a Convention and Civic Center on 4th street. In 2002 the venue was converted into the Seneca Niagara Casino & Hotel. In 2004, a new Niagara Falls Convention Center (NFCC) opened on Old Falls Street. The Old Falls Street venue has 116,000 square feet for exhibitions and meetings, and a 32,200-square-foot event/exhibit hall.

=== Tourism ===
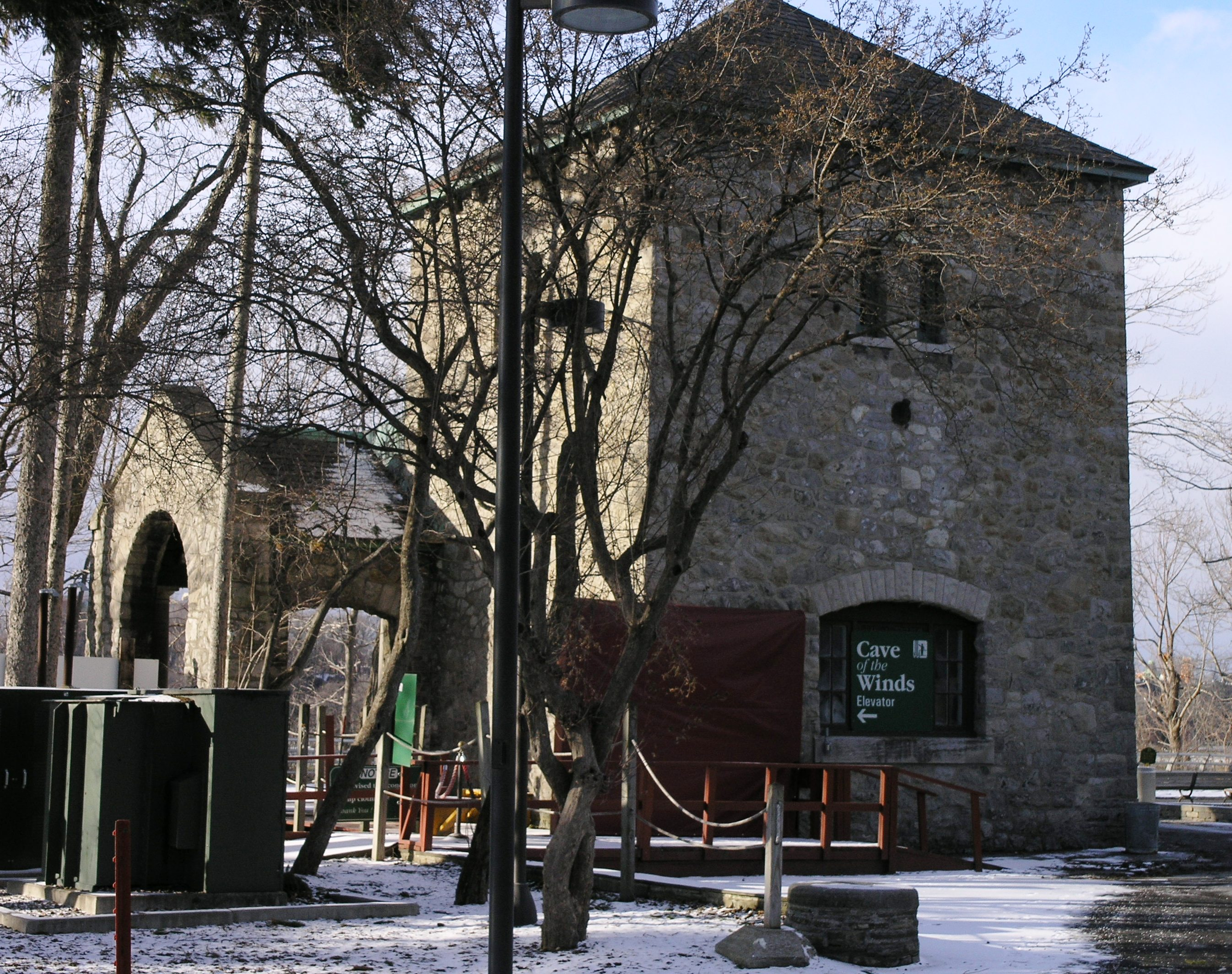
The Cave of the Winds building in the winter

The city is home to the Niagara Falls State Park. The park has several attractions, including Cave of the Winds behind the Bridal Veil Falls, Maid of the Mist, a popular boat tour which operates at the foot of the Rainbow Bridge, Prospect Point and its observation tower, Niagara Discovery Center, Niagara Falls Underground Railroad Heritage Center, and the Aquarium of Niagara.

Several other attractions also near the river, including Whirlpool State Park, De Veaux Woods State Park, Earl W. Brydges Artpark State Park in nearby Lewiston (town), New York, and Fort Niagara State Park in Youngstown, New York.

Attractions in the downtown include the Seneca Niagara Casino & Hotel and Pine Avenue which was historically home to a large Italian American population and is now known as Little Italy for its abundance of shops and quality restaurants.

== Sports ==
The Niagara Falls Americans of the Perfect Game Collegiate Baseball League play at Sal Maglie Stadium.

Former sports teams based in Niagara Falls include the Class-A Niagara Falls Sox, the Class-A Niagara Falls Rapids, the Niagara Falls Lancers of the Midwest Football League, the Western New York Thundersnow of the Premier Basketball League and American Basketball Association, the Cataract City Wolverines of the Gridiron Developmental Football League, and the Niagara Falls PowerHawks of the North American 3 Hockey League.

== Government ==
The City of Niagara Falls functions under a strong mayor-council form of government. The government consists of a mayor, a professional city administrator, and a city council. The current mayor is Robert Restaino.

The city council serves four-year, staggered terms, except in the case of a special election. It is headed by a chairperson, who votes in all items for council action.

On a state level, Niagara Falls is part of the 145th Assembly District of New York State, represented by Republican Angelo Morinello. Niagara Falls is also part of the 62nd Senate District of New York State, represented by Republican Robert Ortt.

On a national level, the city is part of New York's 26th congressional district and is represented by Congressman Tim Kennedy. In the United States Senate, the city and the state are represented by senators Charles Schumer and Kirsten Gillibrand.

Founded in 1892, Niagara Falls Police Department provides local law enforcement, with 155 sworn officers. This force is not to be mistaken for the Town of Niagara, New York which has a smaller force, founded in 1954.

Niagara Falls Fire Department provides fire protection out of 5 stations with seven pieces of apparatus with 139 firefighters.

== Education ==
Residents are zoned to the Niagara Falls City School District, which has the same boundaries as the city. Niagara University and SUNY Niagara are the two colleges in Niagara County.

== Media ==
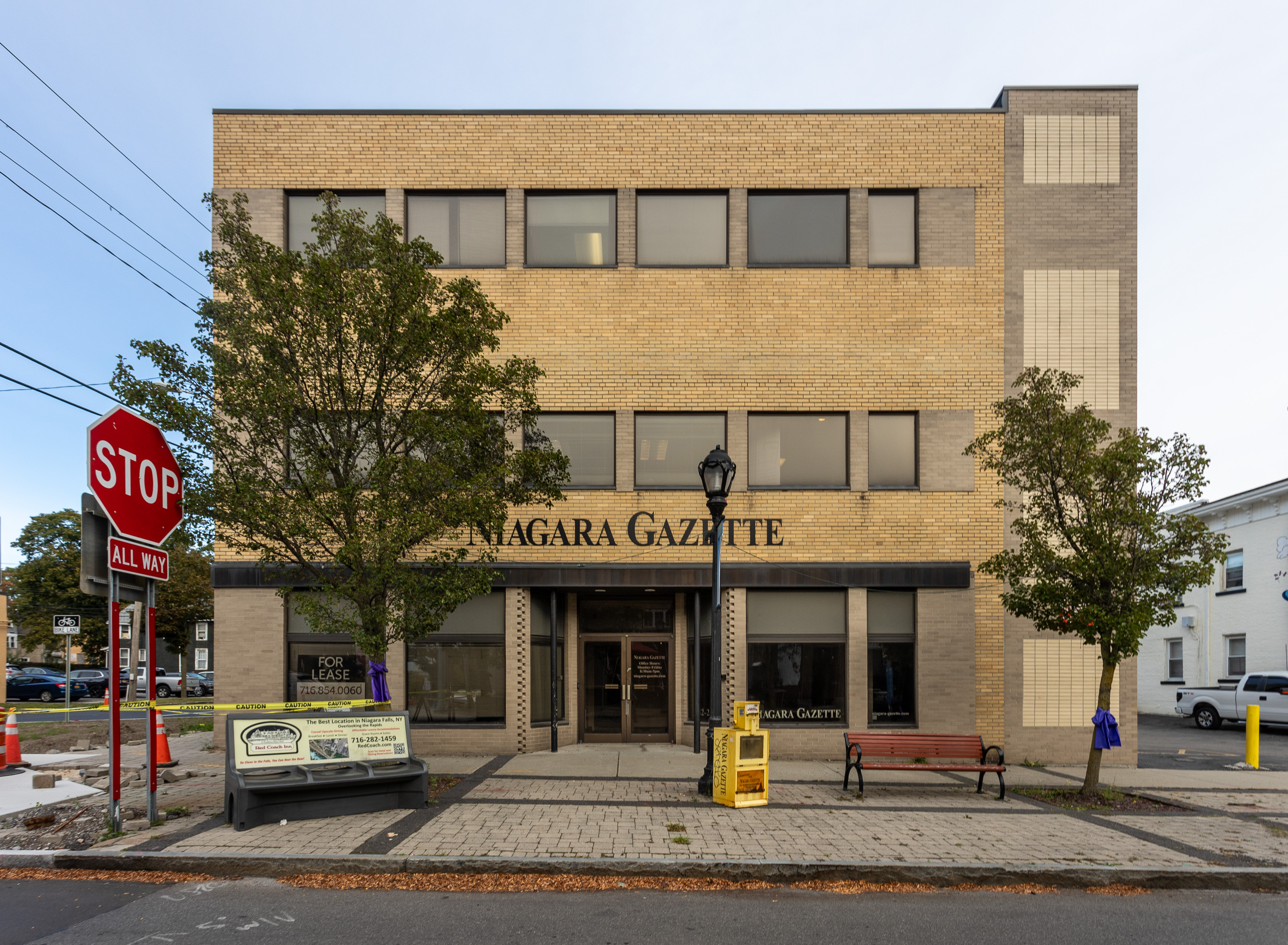
The Niagara Gazette is the city's daily newspaper.

Since Niagara Falls is within the Buffalo–Niagara Falls metropolitan area, the city's media is predominantly served by the city of Buffalo.

The city has two local newspapers, the Niagara Gazette, which is published daily except Tuesday and The Messenger Of Niagara Falls, NY which is published quarterly. The Messenger Of Niagara Falls, NY, which is officially Niagara Falls, New York's, first black-owned and operated news publication, founded October 2018. The Messenger Of Niagara Falls, NY published its inaugural issue April 2019. The Buffalo News is the closest major newspaper in the area. The city also is the home to a weekly tabloid known as the Niagara Falls Reporter.

Three radio stations are licensed to the city of Niagara Falls, including WUSW AM 1270, WEBR AM 1440, and WKSE FM 98.5.

== Infrastructure ==
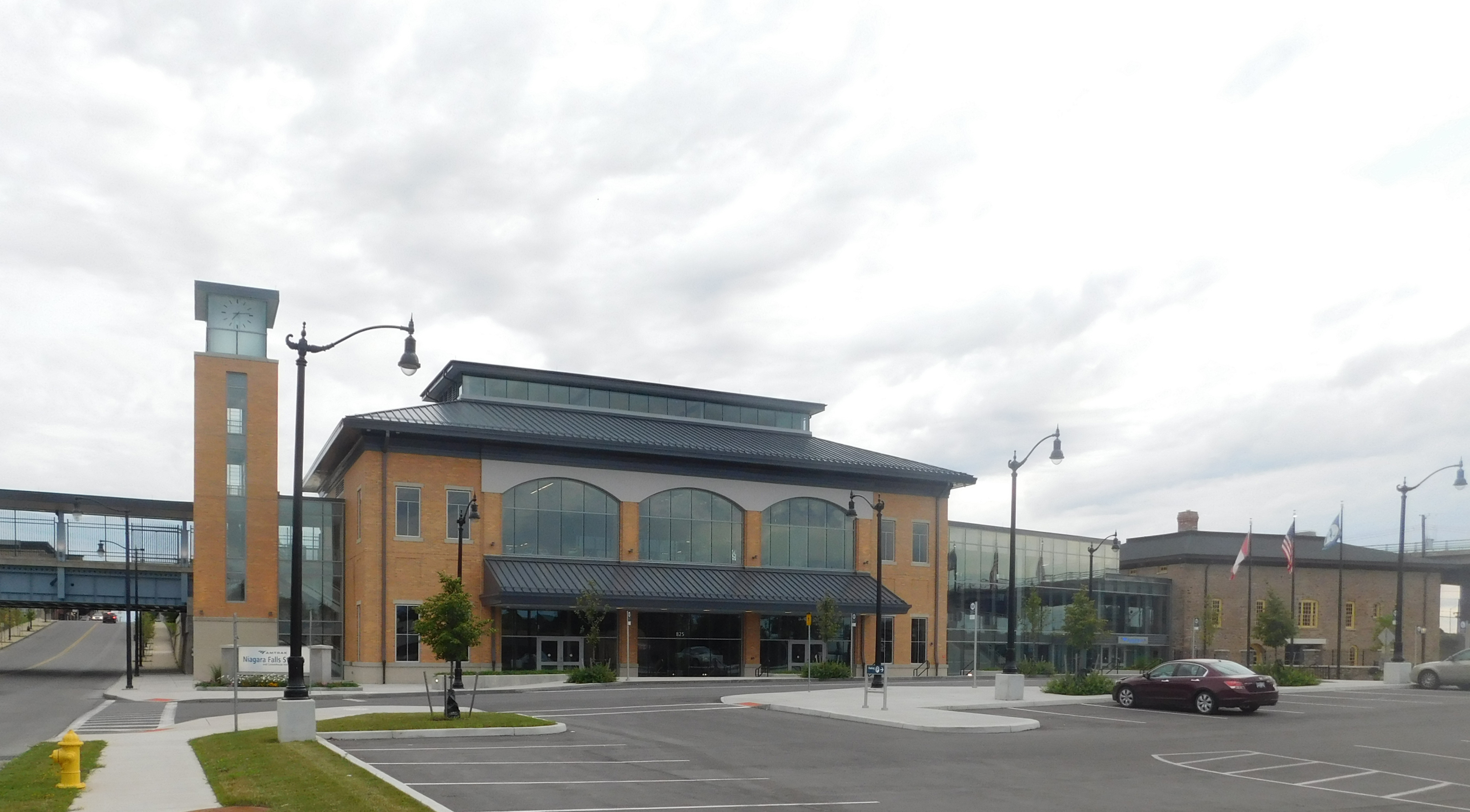
The current Niagara Falls station opened in 2016

Niagara Falls is primarily served by the Buffalo Niagara International Airport for regional and domestic flights within the United States. The recently expanded Niagara Falls International Airport serves the city, and many cross-border travellers, with flights to Myrtle Beach, Fort Lauderdale, Orlando and Punta Gorda. Toronto's Pearson International Airport on the Canadian side is the closest airport offering long-haul international flights for the Niagara region.

The city is served by Amtrak's Maple Leaf and Empire train services, with regular stops at the Niagara Falls Station and Customhouse Interpretive Center at 825 Depot Ave West.

Niagara Frontier Transportation Authority is the public transit provider in the Buffalo metro area, with hubs at the Portage Road and Niagara Falls transportation centers.

Six New York State highways, one three-digit Interstate Highway, one expressway, one U.S. Highway, and one parkways pass through the city of Niagara Falls. New York State Route 31, New York State Route 104, and New York State Route 182 are east–west state roadways within the city. New York State Route 61, New York State Route 265, and New York State Route 384 are north–south state roadways within the city.

The LaSalle Expressway is an east–west highway which terminates near the eastern edge of Niagara Falls and begins in the nearby town of Wheatfield, New York. The Niagara Scenic Parkway is a north–south parkway that formerly ran through the city along the northern edge of the Niagara River. It remains in sections and terminates in Youngstown, New York.

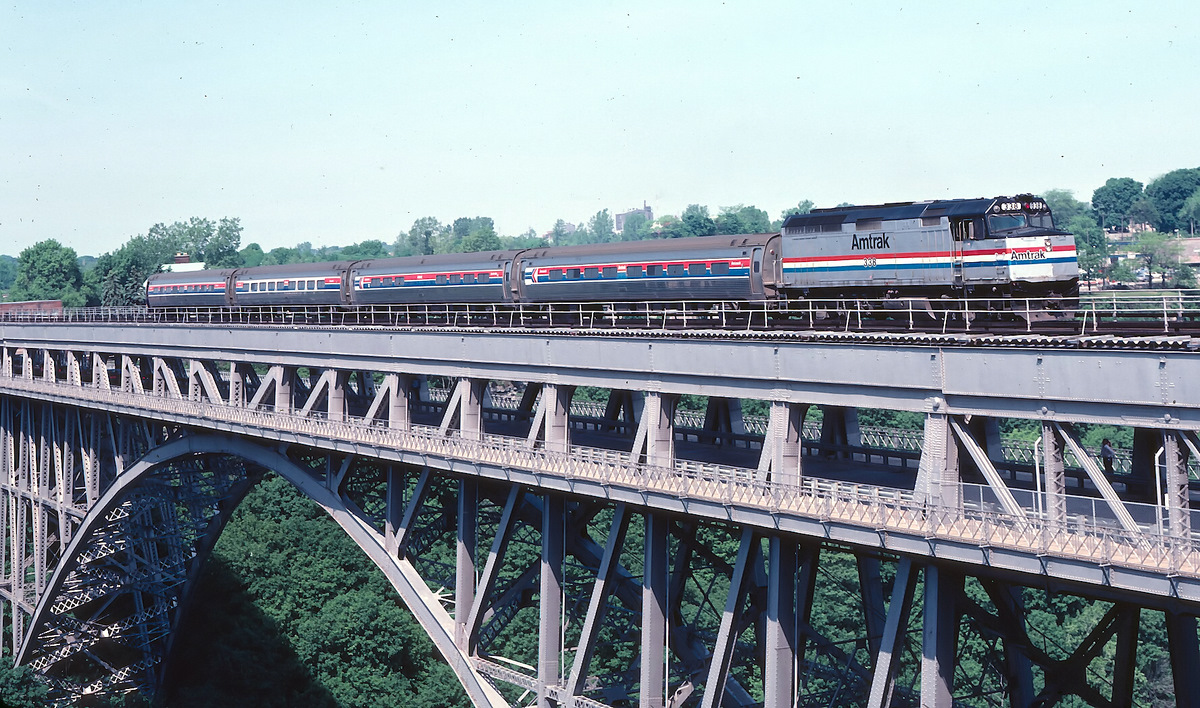
The Whirlpool Rapids bridge, 1983

Interstate 190, also referred to as the Niagara Expressway, is a north–south highway and a spur of Interstate 90 which borders the eastern end of the city. The highway enters the city from the town of Niagara and exits at the North Grand Island Bridge. U.S. Route 62, known as Niagara Falls Boulevard, Walnut Avenue, and Ferry Avenue, is signed as a north–south highway. U.S. Route 62 has an east–west orientation, and is partially split between two one-way streets within Niagara Falls.

Walnut Avenue carries U.S. Route 62 west to its northern terminus at NY 104, and Ferry Avenue carries U.S. Route 62 east from downtown Niagara Falls. U.S. Route 62 Business, locally known as Pine Avenue, is an east–west route which parallels U.S. Route 62 to the south. Its western terminus is at NY 104, and its eastern terminus is at U.S. Route 62.

Two international bridges connect the city to Niagara Falls, Ontario. The Rainbow Bridge connects the two cities with passenger and pedestrian traffic and overlooks the Niagara Falls, while the Whirlpool Rapids Bridge, which formerly carried the Canadian National Railway, now serves local traffic and Amtrak's Maple Leaf service.

== See also ==
- Niagara Falls Public Library
- The Turtle (Native American Center for the Living Arts)
