= Schoellkopf =

Schoellkopf or Schöllkopf is a German surname. Notable people with the surname include:

- Members of the American Schoellkopf business family:
  - Jacob F. Schoellkopf (1819–1899), American business magnate
  - Arthur Schoellkopf (1856–1913), American business magnate and politician
  - Jacob F. Schoellkopf Jr. (1858–1942), American business magnate
  - Henry Schoellkopf (1879–1912), American football player and coach
  - Paul A. Schoellkopf (1884–1947), American business magnate
- Jean-Louis Schoellkopf (born 1946), French photographer
- Ulrich Schöllkopf (1927–1998), German chemist
- Xavier Schoellkopf (1870–1911), French architect

== See also ==
- Schoellkopf Field
- Schoellkopf Power Station
- Schoellkopf Geological Museum
