= Paul A. Schoellkopf =

American industrialist (1884–1947)

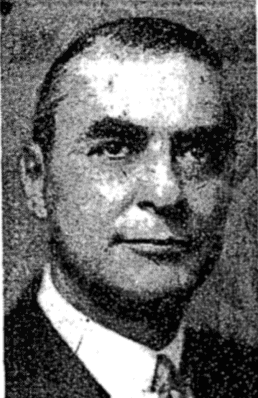
- Born: March 7, 1884; Niagara Falls, New York, US
- Died: September 30, 1947 (aged 63); Buffalo, New York, US
- Resting place: Oakwood Cemetery (Niagara Falls, New York)
- Education: Cascadilla School
- Alma mater: Cornell University
- Occupation: Business magnate
- Spouse: Mattie Irwin (Penn) Schoellkopf
- Children: Paul A. Schoellkopf Jr.
- Parent(s): Arthur Schoellkopf; Jessie (Gluck) Schoellkopf

Paul Arthur Schoellkopf (March 7, 1884 – September 30, 1947) was an American industrialist and the third generation of Schoellkopfs to manage the hydroelectric power plants of Niagara Falls. Schoellkopf served as chairman of the Buffalo Niagara Electric Corporation and was a trustee of Cornell University.

== Early life ==
Paul A. Schoellkopf was born in Niagara Falls, New York on March 7, 1884 to Arthur Schoellkopf (1856-1913) and Jessie (Gluck) Schoellkopf (1856-1928). Schoellkopf's father, Arthur, served as mayor of Niagara Falls from March 1896 – March 1897. Paul studied at the Cascadilla School in Ithaca, New York and the University Preparatory School before entering Cornell University, where he was a member of the Quill and Dagger society and graduated in 1906.

== Career ==
=== Power companies ===
After graduation, he entered the family business and in 1913, succeeded his father as general manager and treasurer of the Hydraulic Power Company of Niagara Falls. When the company merged with the Niagara Falls Power Company in 1919, Schoellkopf became president of the combined organization. He held that position until his death in 1947.

In 1925, the Niagara Falls Power Company joined with other operating western New York utilities to form the Buffalo, Niagara and Eastern Power Corporation, with Schoellkopf as president. He held this position until 1929 when he was elected chairman of the board of directors. Also in 1929, several major utility companies serving a large part of New York were merged into the Niagara Hudson Power Company, which Schoellkopf served as president until 1933.

In 1945, when several of the operating companies of the western division of Niagara Hudson were consolidated into the Buffalo Niagara Electric Corporation, he became chairman of the board.

He was a director of Niagara Hudson Power Company, the Niagara, Lockport and Ontario Power Company, the New York Power and Light Company, the Buffalo General Electric Light Company, the Central Hudson Gas and Electric Corporation, the Tonawanda Power Company, the Eastern States Power Company, the Lower Niagara River Water Supply and Power Company, and the Canadian Niagara Power Company, Ltd.

=== Other business ventures ===
He was also chairman of the board of the Power City Bank in Niagara Falls and president of the Niagara Junction Railway Company, the Lewiston Heights Company, the Gluck Realty Company, the Cliff Paper Company, the Niagara Falls Milling Company, the Frontier Corporation, and the St. Lawrence Security Corporation.

He was a director of the Marine Midland Corporation, the United States Battery Corporation, the Remington-Rand Company, Manufacturers and Traders-Peoples Trust Company, Niagara Falls Hotel Corporation, and Niagara Associated Investors, Inc. He was also a trustee of the Niagara County Savings Bank, the Niagara Falls Memorial Hospital, the Young Women's Christian Association, the Niagara Frontier State Parks Commission, and chairman of the Niagara Frontier Bridge Commission.

Schoellkopf, along with Frank A. Dudley and Afred W. Gray, financed the "Lewiston Heights" neighborhood, part of which was transferred to the Niagara Falls Country Club for their move to Lewiston. At one time Schoellkopf, Dudley, and Gray owned all the land at "Lewiston Heights." Both Dudley and Schoellkopf built mansions on the escarpment (Dudley at 551 Mountain View and Schoellkopf at 583 Mountain View).

== Personal life ==
Schoellkopf had two children:

- Jasmin (Schoellkopf) Boissier (1913–2008), who married Andre Boissier
- Paul A. Schoellkopf Jr. (1916-2000), who married Jane F. Murray

During World War II, Schoellkopf was a member of the State Defense Council. He was a director of the Buffalo Museum of Natural History and a trustee of Cornell University. In 1914, with other members of his family, he donated the funds to complete Schoellkopf Field and built the original stadium in memory of Henry Schoellkopf at Cornell.

Schoellkopf died, aged 63, at Buffalo General Hospital on September 30, 1947. At his death, the gross value of his estate was $2,552,734 (equivalent to $35,948,000 in 2024) and the net value was $2,460,634 (equivalent to $34,651,000 in 2024). The principal beneficiaries were his wife and his two children.

=== Philanthropy and legacy ===
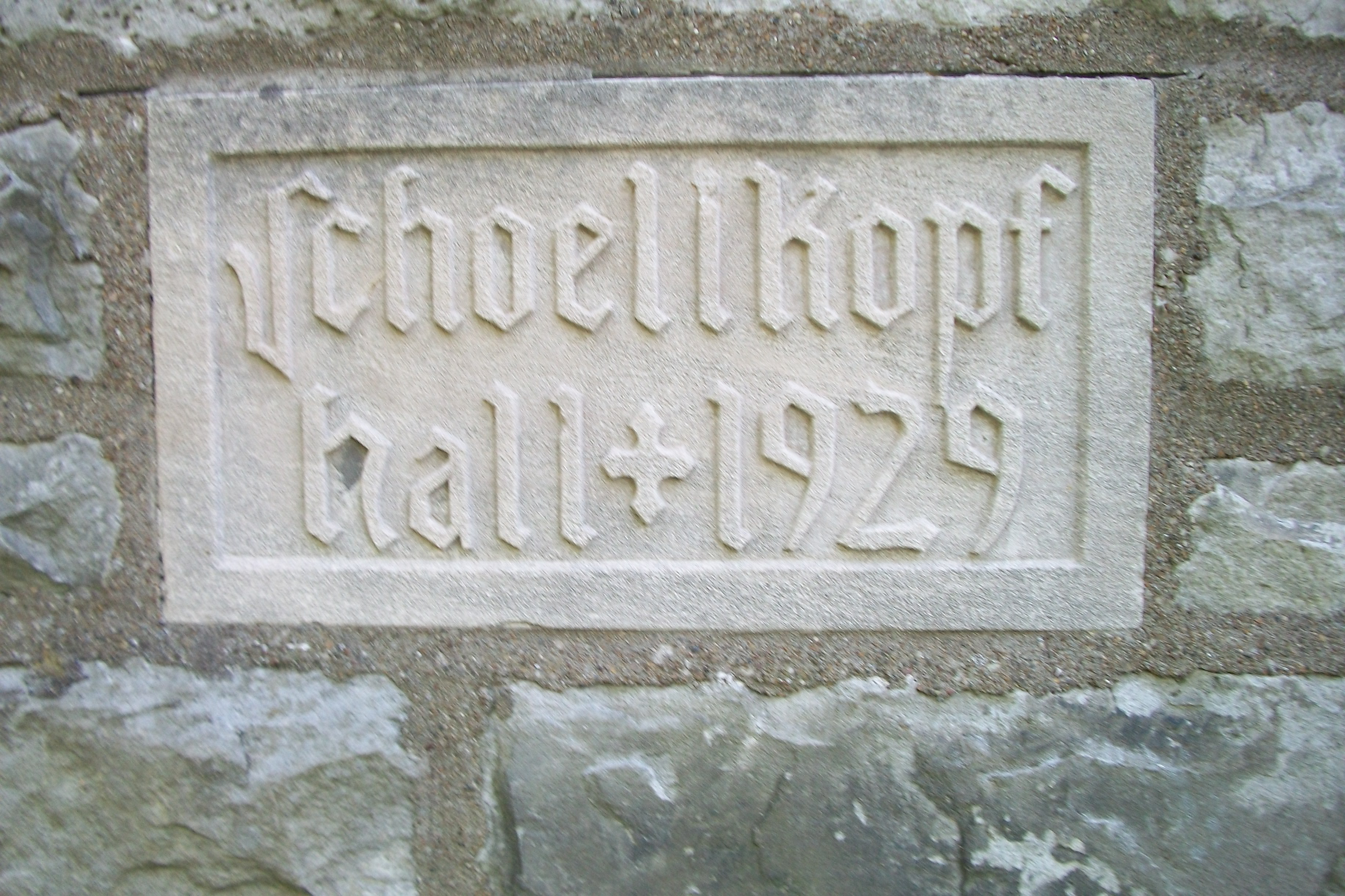
Schoellkopf Hall at the DeVeaux School

"Schoellkopf Hall" at the DeVeaux School (now De Veaux Woods State Park) was named for Schoellkopf, and the Schoellkopf Geological Museum (now the Niagara Gorge Discovery Center) was so named because it was built on the site of the former Schoellkopf Power Plant that fell into the Niagara Gorge in 1956.

== See also ==
- Jacob F. Schoellkopf
- Jacob F. Schoellkopf Jr.
- Henry Schoellkopf
- Schoellkopf Power Station
- Niagara Falls Hydraulic Power & Manufacturing Company
- Frank A. Dudley
- Schoellkopf Field
