= Arthur Schoellkopf =

American industrial leader and mayor

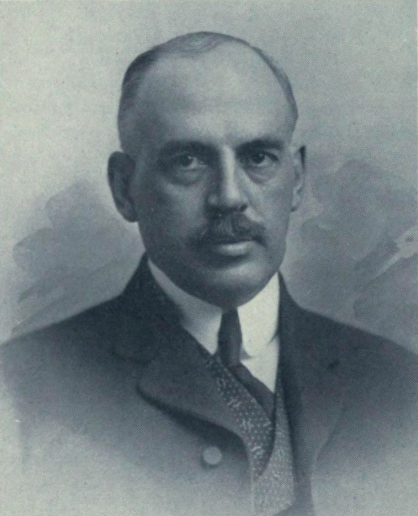

5th Mayor of Niagara Falls, New York
- In office March 1896 – March 1897
- Preceded by: Obediah W. Cutler
- Succeeded by: Arthur C. Hastings

Personal details
- Born: June 13, 1856 Buffalo, New York, US
- Died: February 3, 1913 (aged 56) Miami, Florida, US
- Resting place: Oakwood Cemetery (Niagara Falls, New York)
- Party: Republican
- Spouse: Jessie (Gluck) Schoellkopf
- Children: Paul A. Schoellkopf; Margaret Schoellkopf
- Parent(s): Jacob F. Schoellkopf; Christiana T. (Duerr) Schoellkopf
- Education: Bryant & Stratton College
- Occupation: Politician, Business magnate

Arthur Schoellkopf (June 13, 1856 – February 3, 1913) was an American industrial leader who helped develop the hydroelectric resources of Niagara Falls and served as the fifth Mayor of Niagara Falls, New York.

== Early life ==
Arthur Schoellkopf was born in Buffalo on June 13, 1856, the third son of industrialist Jacob F. Schoellkopf (1819–1899) and Christiana T. Duerr (1827–1903). He started his education at private schools in Buffalo and when he was 9 years old he was sent to the Academy of Kirchheim in Germany, where he spent the next four years. Upon returning to the United States, Arthur finished his schooling at St. Joseph's Collegiate Institute in Buffalo and then attended Bryant and Stratton College.

== Career ==
=== Business career ===
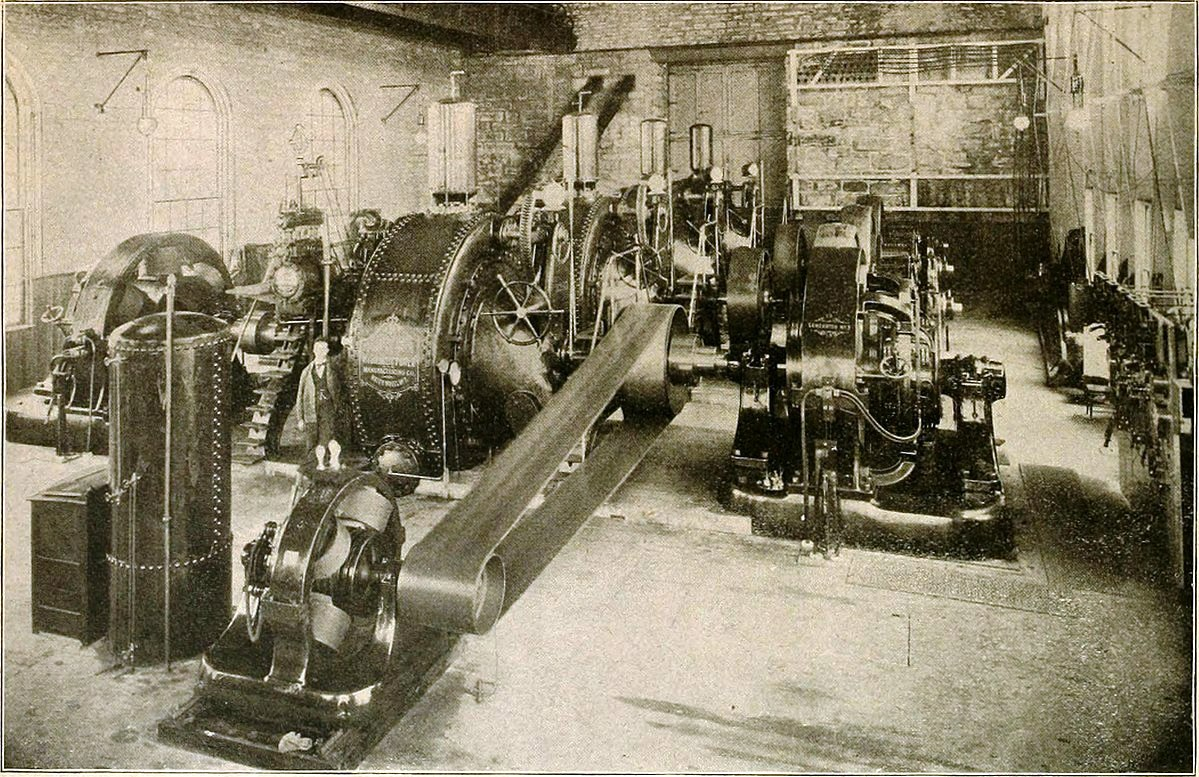
Interior of Power House of the Electric Street Railway in 1891

In 1873, upon completion of his studies, he went to work for the "North Buffalo and Frontier Mills" in Buffalo, operated by "Thornton & Chester", and afterward, "Schoellkopf & Matthews." He worked at Frontier Mills for four years, and in 1877, became a part owner of "Niagara Flouring Mill" at Niagara Falls. By 1908, Schoellkopf was president of "Niagara Falls Milling Company," which included the "Central Mill" and the "Niagara Flouring Mill."

In 1877, his father purchased the Hydraulic Canal at Niagara Falls and in 1878, they formed the Niagara Falls Hydraulic Power and Manufacturing Company, Arthur became secretary, treasurer and general manager of the business.

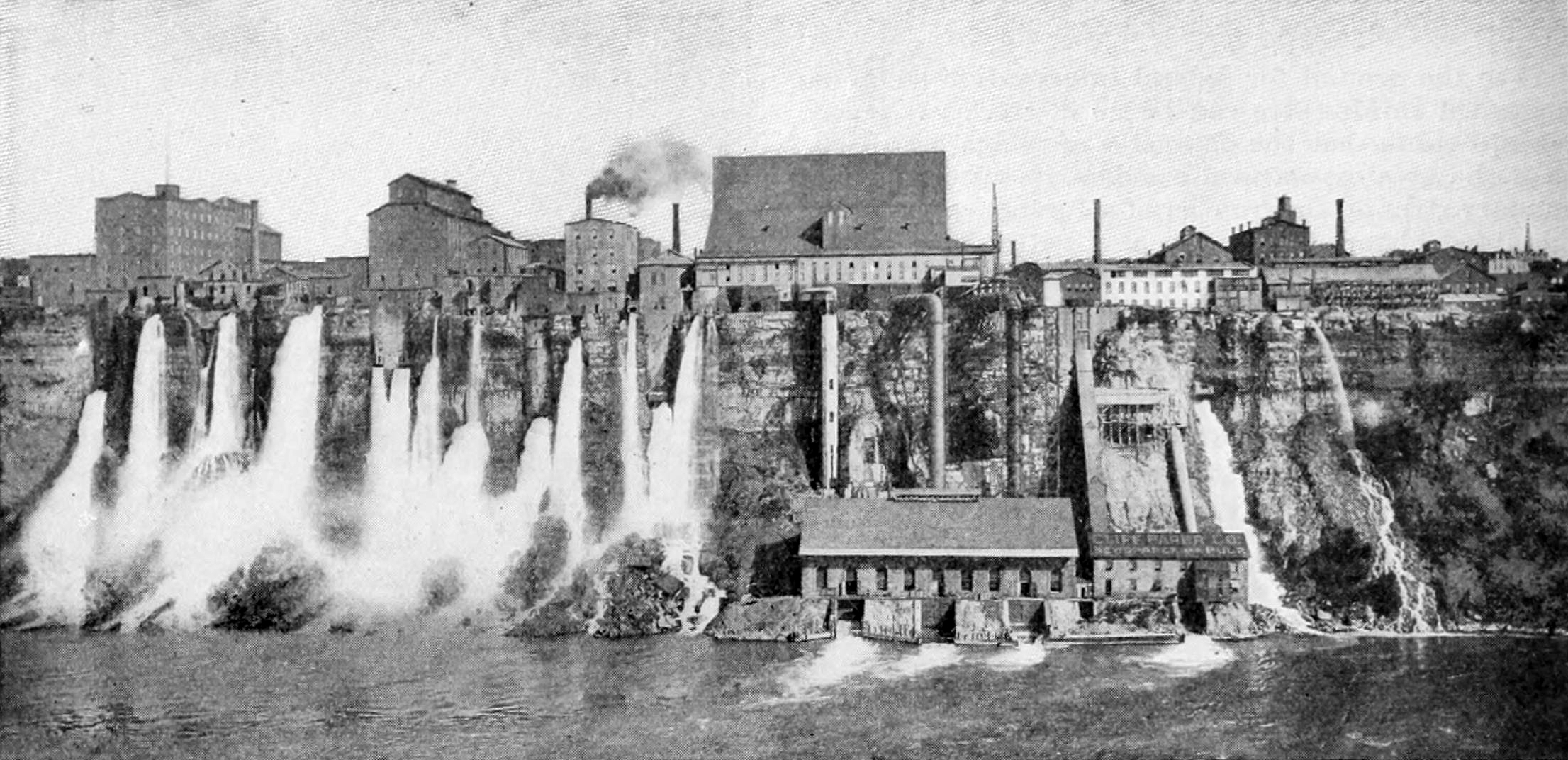
New York side of the gorge, c. 1901

In 1881, along with his father Jacob and Charles Brush, they founded of the "Brush Electric Light Company of Buffalo" which built an electric generator that operated by mechanical power, supplied by the canal water, which used 16 carbon arc lights to illuminate Niagara Falls at night. The Brush Electric Light Company of Buffalo" and the "Thomson-Houston Electric Light and Power Company of Buffalo" later consolidated into the "Buffalo General Electric Company" on August 1, 1892

In 1882, Schoellkopf constructed the first horse-drawn street car system in Niagara Falls (known as the "Niagara Falls and Suspension Bridge Street Railway") completed July 4, 1883, and was manager of that company until 1890 when he sold his interest as it became part of the International Railway system.

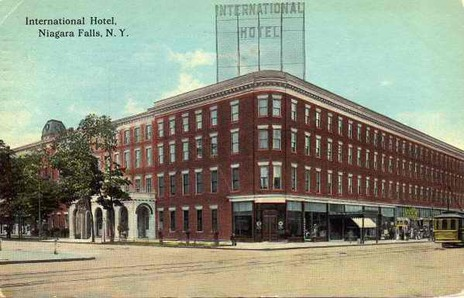
International Hotel in Niagara Falls

Schoellkopf was also on the Board of Directors of the "Niagara County Savings Bank" (which was acquired by Buffalo Savings Bank in 1981 and dissolved in 1991), the "International Hotel Company" (which operated the International Hotel, built in 1853 by B. F. Childs at the corner of Falls Avenue at Main Street in Niagara Falls, and was destroyed by fire on January 3, 1918), and the "New York Mutual Savings and Loan Association." He was founder (in June 1893) and president for 17 years of the "Power City Bank," president of the "Gluck Realty Co." which built the Gluck Block on the site of the burned "Spencer House, president of the "Cliff Paper Company" (which manufactured wood pulp and news paper and owned the "Cliff mill", the first development to harness Niagara Falls' water power of over 100 ft.) and the "Park Theater Company."

=== Horse breeding ===
In the 1880s, Schoellkopf owned "Niagara View Farms." The Farms was located in what was then open land in the Town of Niagara, but is now within the City of Niagara Falls, the modern boundaries of the farm are Hyde Park Boulevard (then Sugar Street) on the west, Ontario Street on the north, Linwood Avenue on the south and Gill Creek on the east. The Farm was a stud farm and bred some of the finest horses in the United States, including the champion trotter "Niagara King." The Farm also included a piggery and a hennery on the property.

=== Political career ===
In March 1896, Arthur Schoellkopf was elected mayor of the City of Niagara Falls. His campaign slogan was "municipal government is business, not politics" and he was overwhelmingly elected by every district in the city. In an 1897 article, his administration was characterized by "no scandals, no jangles in the Common Council; the sessions have been business like and have not lasted all night… he has made the best Mayor we have had."

After a year in office, Schoellkopf made the decision not to run for a second term citing that "his private business would not allow him to devote the necessary time to the city's affairs" and so he declined the Republican mayoral nomination for 1897.

== Personal life ==
In 1880, Arthur married Jessie Gluck, daughter of Alva Gluck, one of Niagara Falls' most prominent citizens and builder of the "Gluck Building," a local landmark from 1892 until it burned down in 1959. Together, Arthur and Jessie had two children:

- Margaret Beatrice Schoellkopf (1881–1965), who married Thomas Jefferson Penn (1875-1946) and moved to Reidsville, North Carolina).
- Paul Arthur Schoellkopf (1884-1947), who married Mattie Irwin Penn (1885-1973) in 1911

In 1879, Arthur built a large stone house on a triangular piece of property bounded by Main Street, Pine Avenue and Park Place. The house was torn down in 1935 to make way for a tire store, but the stone wall that surrounded the property is still there.

Schoellkopf was a member of Niagara Frontier Lodge No. 132, F. & A. M., Knights Templar and of Ismailia Temple, Nobles of the Mystic Shrine of Buffalo. He was also exalted Ruler of Lodge No. 346, Benevolent and Protective Order of Elks. He belonged to the "Niagara Falls Chamber of Commerce," the "Ellicott Club of Buffalo," and a member and Trustee of the First Presbyterian Church of Niagara Falls. Schoellkopf's son, Paul, later served as president of the consolidated Niagara Falls Power Company.

=== Death ===
In the 1910s, Schoellkopf's health became impaired by unnamed "complicated disorders." He sought relief from his ailments by spending the winters in Florida. He died unexpectedly, at 56 years old, in Miami on February 3, 1913, of complications from a "serious illness." After a funeral service at the First Presbyterian Church on First Street, Schoellkopf's remains were placed in a vault at Oakwood Cemetery in Niagara Falls to be buried later in the family plot at Forest Lawn in Buffalo, New York. It was later decided by the family to have him remain in Niagara Falls, so Schoellkopf and his wife Jessie, who died in 1928 (at her residence 1 West 70th Street in New York City) are interred in the mausoleum at Oakwood Cemetery.

=== Philanthropy and legacy ===
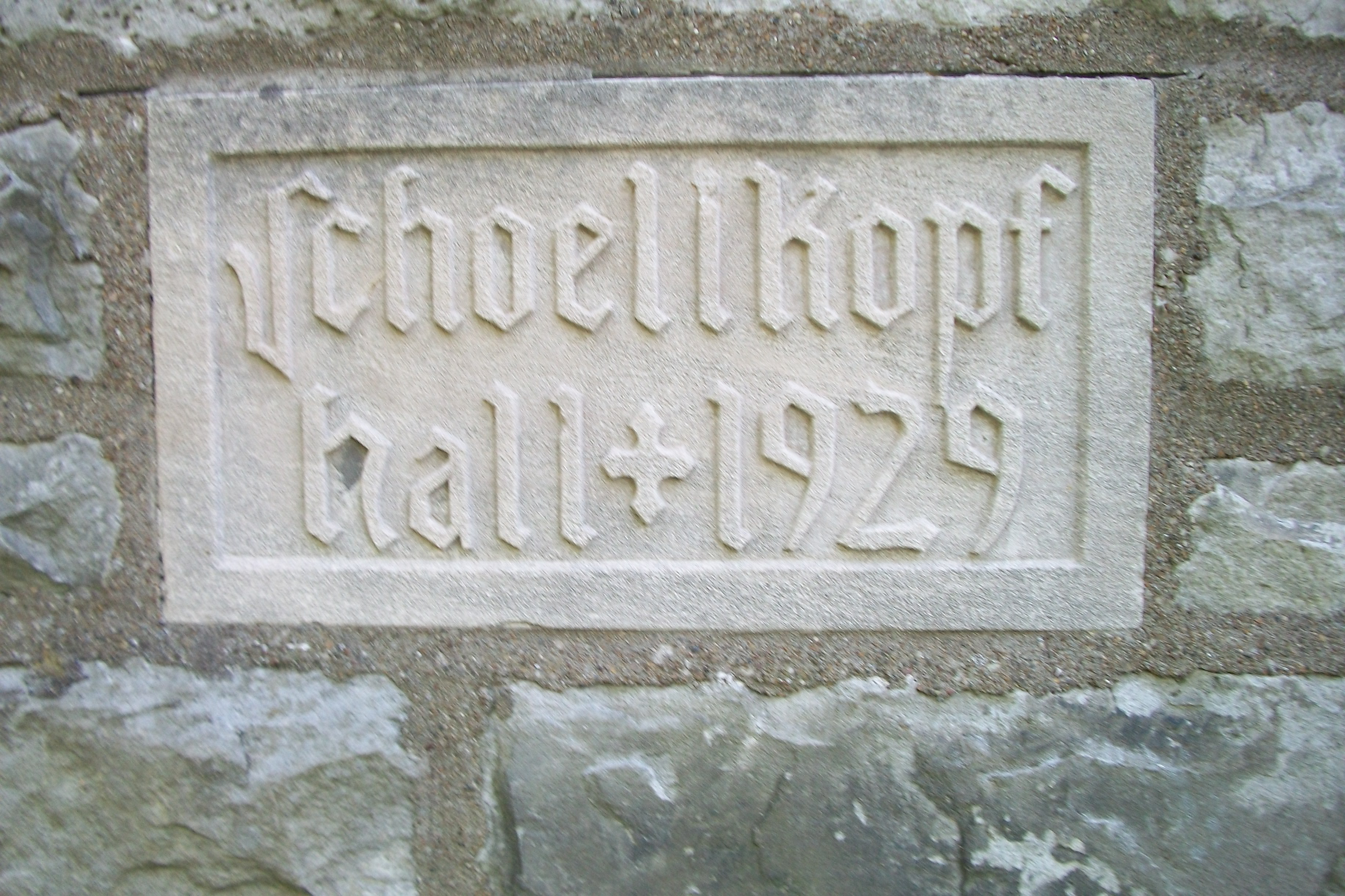
Schoellkopf Hall at the DeVeaux School

Schoellkopf was one of the founders of the Niagara Falls Memorial Hospital in 1895, as well as the Niagara Falls branch of the YMCA that same year. In 1906, Schoellkopf was approached by Peter A. Porter to donate a small triangular lot across from his residence in Niagara Falls, New York (at Main and Pine) for use as a city park. Porter asked Schoellkopf to "advise us as to the possibilities of its being so secured at this time." The Schoellkopf turned the property over to the city, and in 1920, the parcel became the "Soldiers, Sailors and Marines Memorial Park." Since that time, other veterans memorials have been added to the park.

"Schoellkopf Park," along Portage Road between Pine Avenue and Walnut Avenue, was a gift from Schoellkopf's wife, Jessie, in memory of Arthur. "Schoellkopf Hall" at the DeVeaux School (now De Veaux Woods State Park) was named for Arthur's son Paul, and the Schoellkopf Geological Museum (now the Niagara Gorge Discovery Center) was so named because it was built on the site of the former Schoellkopf Power Plant that fell into the Niagara Gorge in 1956.

== See also ==
- Jacob F. Schoellkopf
- Jacob F. Schoellkopf Jr.
- Paul A. Schoellkopf
- Henry Schoellkopf
- Schoellkopf Power Station
- Niagara Falls Hydraulic Power & Manufacturing Company
