= Frank A. Dudley =

American politician (1864–1945)

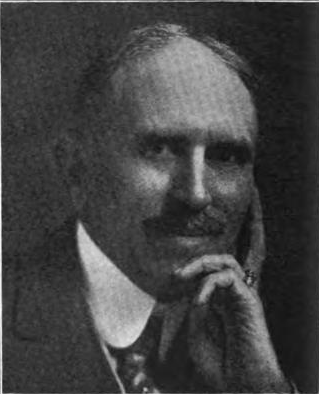

Member of the New York State Assembly from the 45th District
- In office January 1, 1896 – December 31, 1897
- Preceded by: Inaugural holder
- Succeeded by: Henry S. Tompkins

Personal details
- Born: Frank Alonzo Dudley; January 30, 1864 Wilson, New York, U.S.
- Died: September 21, 1945 (aged 81) Lewiston, New York, U.S.
- Party: Republican
- Spouse: Etta Brown Payne
- Parent(s): Phineas Dudley; Elizabeth Graves
- Education: Wisconsin State College of Milwaukee
- Profession: Lawyer, businessman, hotelier

Frank Alonzo Dudley (January 30, 1864 – September 21, 1945) was an American lawyer, politician, hotelier and business owner associated with Niagara Falls, New York. Dudley established the United Hotels Company of America and the "Lewiston Heights" neighborhood in Lewiston, New York.

== Early life ==
Frank Alonzo Dudley was born in the Town of Wilson, New York on January 30, 1864. He was the third of five children to John Alexander Dudley (b. 1829), born in Guilford, Connecticut, and Henrietta Wright (1832–1887), born in Lockport, New York. His father was the son of Phineas Dudley Jr. (son of Phineas Dudley (1752–1793)) and Elizabeth Graves, who was a great-granddaughter of Colonial Connecticut Governor John Webster (1590–1661). His maternal grandparents were lthureal Wright and Candace Gaskill.

During his infancy, his parents moved to the Town of Whitewater, Wisconsin, where he lived on a farm until he was about 14 years old. At that point, he moved to the village, now city, of Whitewater, Wisconsin and for the next four years, he attended the district school and subsequently that State Normal School, which later became the University of Wisconsin–Milwaukee.

== Career ==
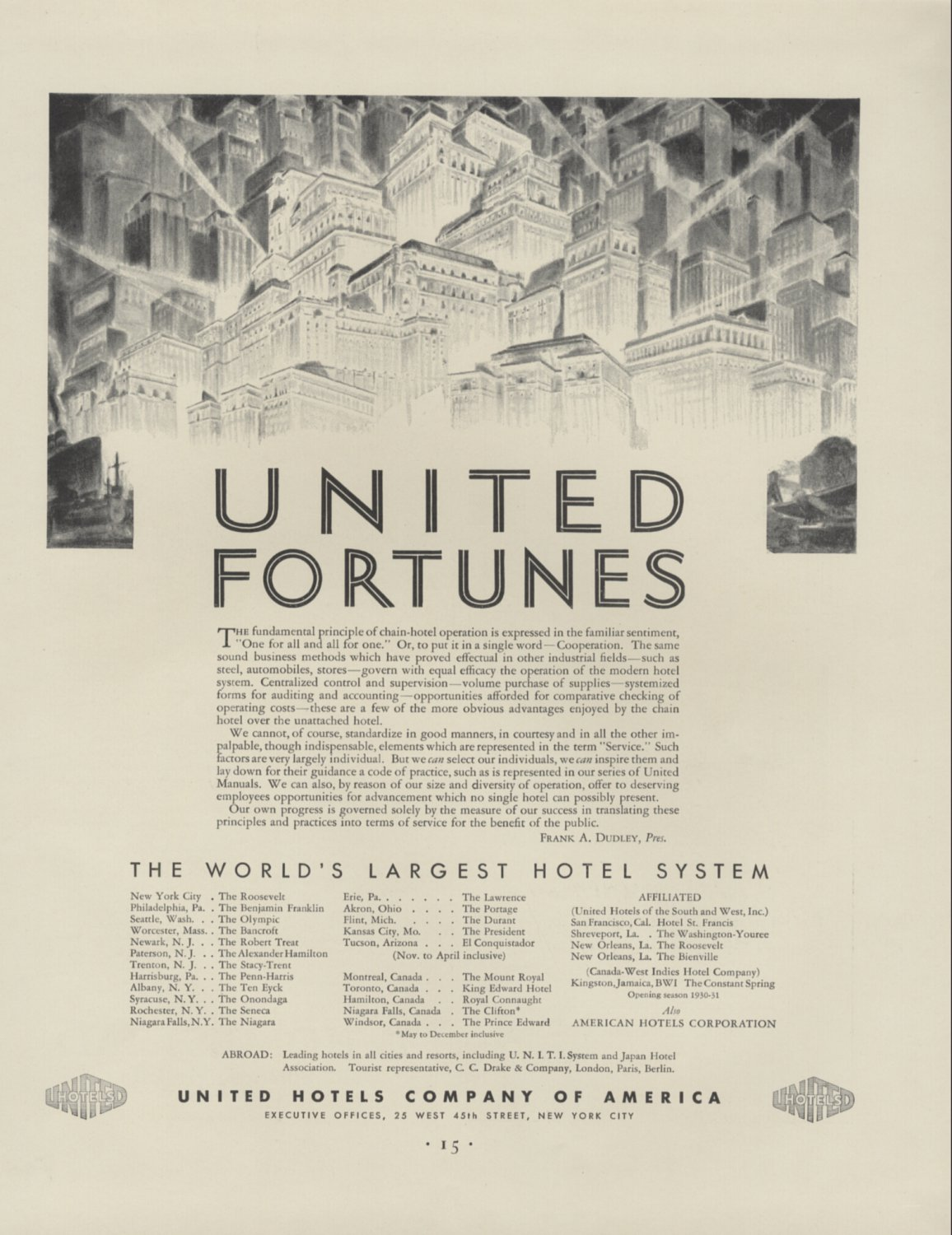
United Hotels Company of America Ad

In 1882, he returned to New York, relocating to Lockport, where he read law with Joshua Gaskill. He was admitted to the bar in June 1886, at the same time as Cuthbert W. Pound. In 1887, he settled permanently in Niagara Falls, New York, where in 1888, he formed a co-partnership with W. Caryl Ely, under the firm name of "Ely & Dudley", which later became "Ely, Dudley & Cohn."

Dudley was also a partner, until his death in 1945, with "Dudley, Gray, Phelps, & Gray" with Alfred W. Gray, Alpheus R. Phelps, and Newman Gray, a law firm based out of the NRHP listed United Office Building in Niagara Falls, New York he had built in 1929 by James A. Johnson of Esenwein & Johnson.

=== Political career ===
In politics, he was an active and prominent Republican, and in 1895 and 1896, was elected to the 119th and 120th New York State Legislature. As a candidate for the Assembly, Dudley received 3,556 votes; to 2,226 for Edward T. Williams, Democrat; 200 for Elmer B. Townsend, Prohibitionist; and 53 for B. Burt Hayes, Populist. In the Assembly of 1896, Dudley was a member of the "Judiciary Claims" and "Federal Relations" committees and in the 120th Legislature, he was the "Chairman of Taxation and Retrenchment." Dudley introduced and championed several bills which became laws including: (1) a law giving the Niagara Falls Hydraulic Manufacturing Company (owned by Jacob F. Schoellkopf) the permanent right to use the waters of the Niagara River, sufficient to develop 100,000 horsepower; and (2) a graduated inheritance tax bill designed to equalize the burden of taxation throughout the State. The bill was known as the "Dudley tax bill," and was vetoed by Governor Frank S. Black.

During the 1932 Presidential Election campaign, Dudley served as president of the "Republican Hotel Men's Association."

=== Business career ===
Dudley was early connected with the power development at Niagara Falls and was one of the incorporators and organizers of many different companies. He was one of the incorporators and organizers of the Buffalo and Niagara Falls Electric Railway, later part of International Railway System. Dudley was also one of the originators of the Whirlpool and Northern Electric Railway, which extended into the Town of Lewiston. He was one of the organizers of the 1898 Lewiston Connecting Bridge between Lewiston, New York and Queenston, Ontario in Canada.

Dudley organized the "North Coast Railway of State of Washington," of which he was the first president. The railway was later taken over by the Harriman Interests, and became part of the Southern and Union Pacific Systems. He was a stockholder and a vice-president in a number of business and commercial enterprises of Niagara Falls, including the "Electric City Bank," (established December 1, 1894). which later merged into "Niagara Falls Trent Co.", of which Dudley was its first President.

Dudley was one of the founders and served as vice-president of "Niagara Falls Electrical Transmission Company", incorporated February 25, 1905 for the transmission and sale of electricity. The president and treasurer was Frederic Thomas Nicholls and the company was controlled through stock ownership by the Electrical Development Company of Ontario, Ltd. It owned franchises in the towns of Tonawanda, Lockport, Pendleton, Royalton, and Sweden, as well as the cities of Tonawanda, North Tonawanda, and Lockport, including the villages of Medina and Holley. In addition to the franchises, the company had a controlling interest in the "Niagara Falls Gas and Electric Light Company" (Dudley was president and Nicholls was vice-president and treasurer). Its revenues derived from the rental of real estate.

Dudley was a director of the Niagara Falls Power Co., the first great power development of Niagara.

=== Real estate and hotels ===
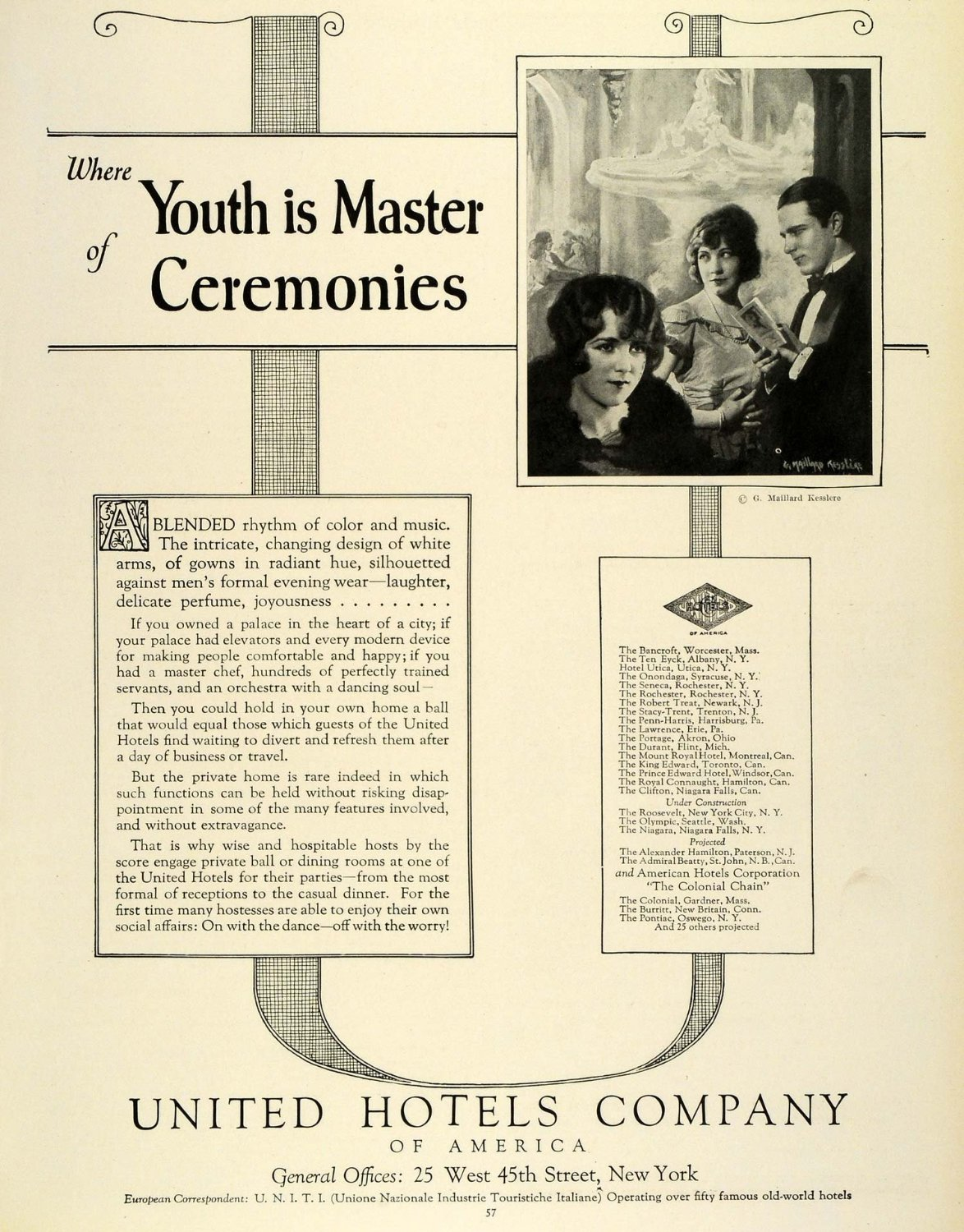
United Hotels Company Ad

In 1901, Dudley organized the Niagara Falls Country Club, of which he was President for 4 terms. In 1916, the Club moved from Niagara Falls to Lewiston. A.W. Tillinghast was engaged to design the course in Lewiston, completed in 1919. The former site in Niagara Falls became the Hyde Park Golf Club.

Dudley, along with Paul A. Schoellkopf, a son of Arthur Schoellkopf, and Afred W. Gray, financed the "Lewiston Heights" neighborhood, part of which was transferred to the Niagara Falls Country Club for their move to Lewiston. At one time Dudley, Schoellkopf, and Gray owned all the land at Lewiston Heights. Both Dudley and Schoellkopf built mansions on the escarpment (Dudley at 551 Mountain View and Schoellkopf at 583 Mountain View).

In 1910, Dudley, along with F. W. Rockwell, organized the United Hotels Company of America and Dudley served as its president. Its executive office was at 45 Falls St. in Niagara Falls, New York and its administrative office was at 25 W. 45th St. in New York City. He was also president of the American Purchasing Corporation with offices in London, New York City and Toronto, president of the Mount Royal Hotel Company, Ltd. in Montreal, the King Edward Hotel Co. Ltd. in Toronto, the Connaught Hotel Co. Ltd. in Hamilton, the Clifton Co. Ltd. in Niagara Falls, the Seneca Hotel and Rochester Hotel in Rochester, the Bancroft Hotel in Worcester, the Robert Trent Hotel Co. in Newark, the Penn Harris Hotel Co. in Harrisburg, the Stacy Hotel Co. in Trenton, and the Hotel Co. in Akron, Ohio.

In addition the being president of United Hotels Company of America, Dudley served as vice-president of American Hotels Corporation, as well as president or vice-president of 24 hotel subsidiary companies, at the time the largest hotel group in the world under one control Dudley has been referred to as "the Conrad Hilton of his day."

== Personal life ==
On December 17, 1890, Dudley married Etta Brown Payne, daughter of Wesley Payne and Harriet Ann Sackett Brown, of Niagara Falls, New York. Etta was a member of the Daughters of the American Revolution through three great grandfathers, Elijah Gilbert, Stephen Pain, and Rufus Butts.

Frank and Etta lived at 626 Pine Avenue in Niagara Falls, New York for many years until they moved to 551 Mountain View Drive in Lewiston Heights. The house was completed in 1927 and was designed by prominent Buffalo architect James A. Johnson of Esenwein & Johnson, who also designed several of the hotels for the United Hotels Company of America.

Frank A. Dudley died at his home on September 21, 1945. At the time of his death, Frank was the oldest practicing attorney in Niagara County. Etta Dudley later died on August 1, 1957.

=== Clubs and organizations ===
Dudley was a Knight Templar Mason, holding membership in Niagara Frontier Lodge, No. 132 F. & A.M., a member of the order of Nobles of the Mystic Shrine, and also a member of the Sons of the American Revolution, the Sovereign Colonial Society of Royal Descent, Society of Colonial Wars, and Society of the American Revolution. For 5 years, he volunteered with the National Guard as a member of the Forty-second Separate Company. He was also a member of various organizations for the development and improvement of international waterways and the Erie Canal. He was a member of the Bankers Club of New York in New York City, the Niagara Club, and the Niagara Falls Country Club in Lewiston. Dudley was also president of the Niagara Falls Historical Society.

=== Legacy ===
On April 4, 1922, Dudley's wife Etta organized the Niagara Falls Chapter of the National Society Daughters of the American Revolution. It was the 147th in the state and the charter was presented on November 5, 1932. Through her involvement with the Niagara Falls chapter, Etta was instrumental in the restoration of Old Fort Niagara between 1926 and 1934.

== See also ==
- 119th New York State Legislature
- 120th New York State Legislature
- United Hotels Company of America
- William Caryl Ely

New York State Assembly
Preceded by Inaugural holder	Member of the New York State Assembly for the 45th District; 1896–1897	Succeeded by Henry S. Tompkins
