= Niagara Falls Hydraulic Power and Manufacturing Company =

Former American power company

- Industry: Hydroelectric utilities
- Founded: 1835
- Founder: Caleb Smith Woodhull
- Defunct: 1918
- Fate: Merged with Niagara Falls Power Company
- Headquarters: Niagara Falls, New York, United States
- Key people: Caleb Smith Woodhull; Jacob F. Schoellkopf; Arthur Schoellkopf; Jacob F. Schoellkopf Jr.

Niagara Falls Hydraulic Power & Manufacturing Company was an American company, based in Niagara Falls, New York that was the first company to generate hydroelectric power from Niagara Falls, in 1882. The company built upon several predecessor companies efforts to construct a canal used for hydraulic mill power. In 1918, the company merged with Niagara Falls Power Company, which later became Niagara Mohawk and in 2002 was acquired by National Grid plc.

== Early history ==
=== Porter, Barton and Company ===
In 1805, "Porter, Barton & Company," which comprised Augustus Porter, Peter Porter, Benjamin Barton, and Joseph Anim, purchased the Niagara River and the American Falls from New York at a public auction. The purchase also included the water rights from above the upper rapids to below the Falls. The company transported goods by land over the Niagara Portage from Lake Erie to Lewiston on the Niagara River, then shipped them east on Lake Ontario. When the Erie Canal opened in 1825, it made the portage obsolete and plans to develop Niagara Falls suffered. Augustus proposed a hydraulic mill canal in 1847 and offered the right of way for the canal to any person ready to build it, but the Porter brothers died before interest in the project led to construction.

== Company history ==
=== Niagara Falls Hydraulic Company ===
In 1852, Caleb Smith Woodhull and his associates purchased the land and the water rights from the heirs of the Porter brothers with the intention to build a canal, and in 1853 formed the "Niagara Falls Hydraulic Company." A grant was obtained from the owners of a strip of land 100 ft. wide extending from a point above the upper rapids to the high bank below the Falls. The company started with the construction of the canal in 1853 but stopped after sixteen months because construction costs of the canal significantly exceeded estimates and the company went bankrupt.

=== Niagara Falls Water Power Company ===
In 1856, Stephen N. Allen bought the company, which was renamed the "Niagara Falls Water Power Company." The company completed the entrance and river portion of the canal by 1857, with the exception of a narrow extension at the south end of the basin which was completed in 1881.

=== Niagara Falls Canal Company ===
In 1860, Horace H. Day purchased the company and renamed it the "Niagara Falls Canal Company." At an investment of $1.5 million, (equivalent to $45,352,000 in 2025) the canal was finally completed in 1861, but could not be used because of the American Civil War. After completing the canal project, it was idle until 1875 when the canal's first customer, Charles B. Gaskill's "Cataract City Milling Company", was using the water of the canal to power the milling company's flour grist mill.

=== Niagara Falls Hydraulic Power and Manufacturing Company ===
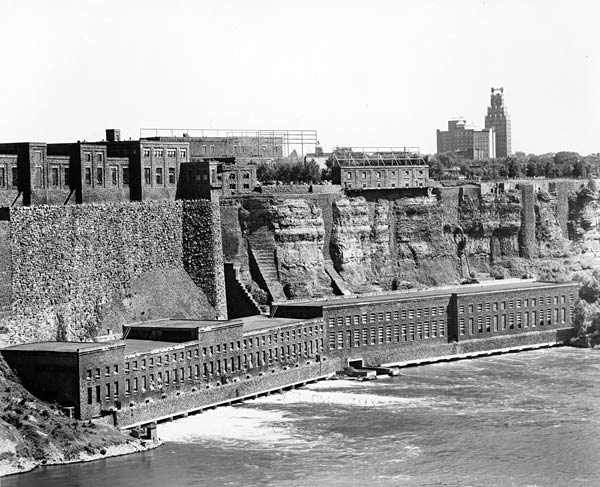
Schoellkopf Stations 3, 3-B and 3-C

In 1877, as the company had only attracted one client, it declared bankruptcy and was auctioned off. The company interests were bought for $71,000 (equivalent to $2,147,000 in 2025) by Jacob F. Schoellkopf, who in 1878 formed the "Niagara Falls Hydraulic Power and Manufacturing Company" to use the canal.

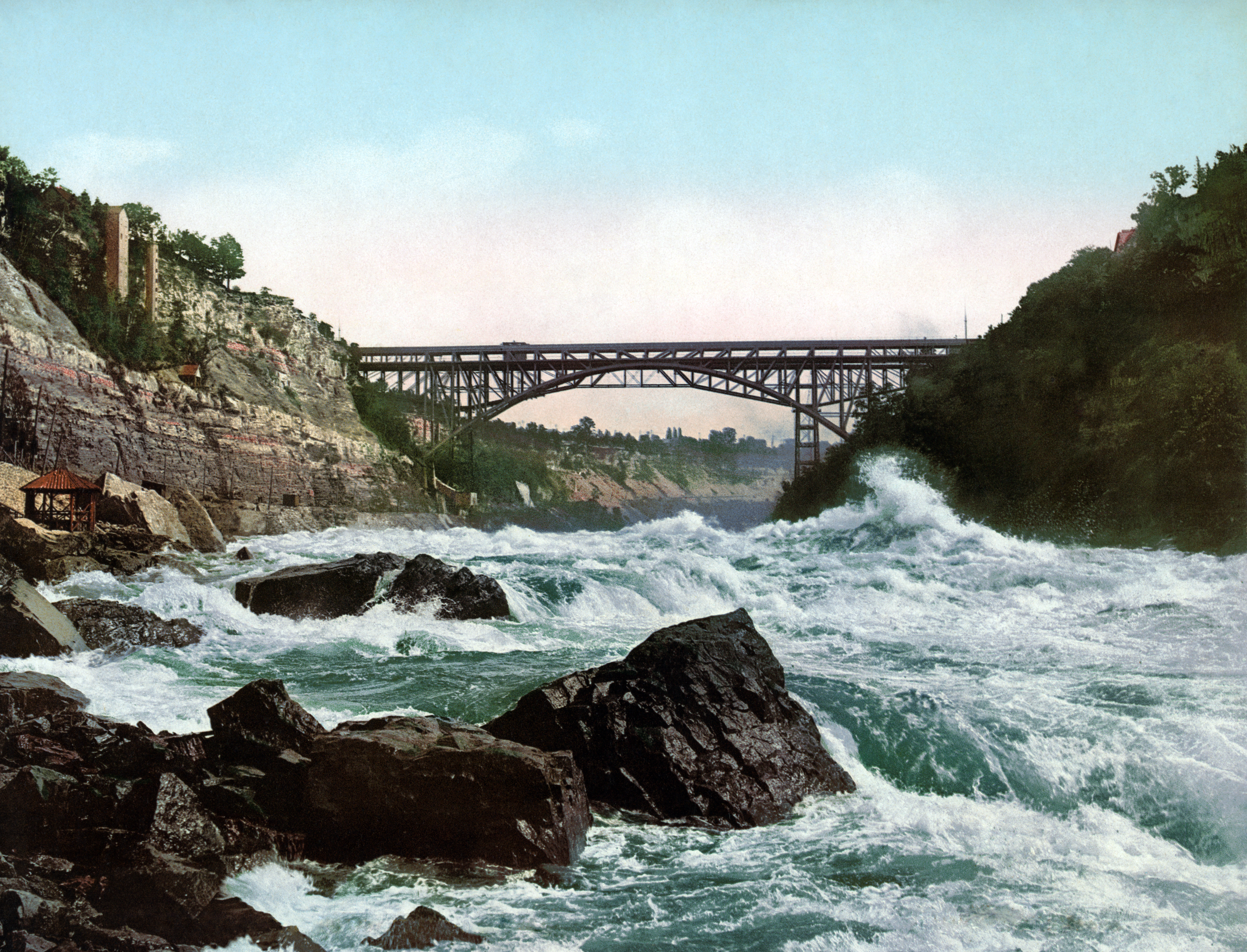
Lower Steel Arch Bridge

After the transfer of the property, Schoellkopf finished the excavating, but the canal remained idle for a few years. The work on the power plant began and the canal was enlarged in 1892. By 1896, power plant number two had been completed and was supplying power to different factories above Niagara Falls. Many additions and extensions were made to the original plant, and company began to work on a new plant, called plant number three, that when completed, was separate from the original plant around six or eight hundred feet to the north. The workings of the Hydraulic company were entirely below the first Upper Steel Arch Bridge.

Plant number two, which was one 100 ft. by 176 ft. in dimensions, generated an average of 34,000 continuous horsepower. The entire fall of the water in the canal from the forebay to the tailrace is 210 ft. The power canal, which taps the river at a point above Port Day, and runs throughout the city to a point below the Upper Steel Arch Bridge, furnished a steady supply of water year round. Just below Port Day is the beginning of the rapids, with a fall of more than 50 ft. in three-quarters of a mile. By cutting across a bend in the river the canal comes out at the cliff below the bridge the entire distance being about 4,400 ft. Built before the era of industrial production of alternating current, the electrical plant generated direct-current electricity, and only provided it within a range of two miles from the plant.

In 1898 the company built the Niagara Junction Railway to encourage industrial expansion in the area.

==== Hydraulic Power Company of Niagara Falls ====
In 1907, the New York Public Service Commission law was passed which regulated the rights of non-electrical corporations from engaging in the development of electric energy and distribution of it. Therefore, the hydraulic business of "Niagara Falls Hydraulic Power and Manufacturing Company" became the "Hydraulic Power Company of Niagara Falls" and "Cliff Electrical Distributing Company" was formed to distribute the power. The "Hydraulic Power Company" owned the building itself, the land, the penstocks, the turbines, and the water wheels.

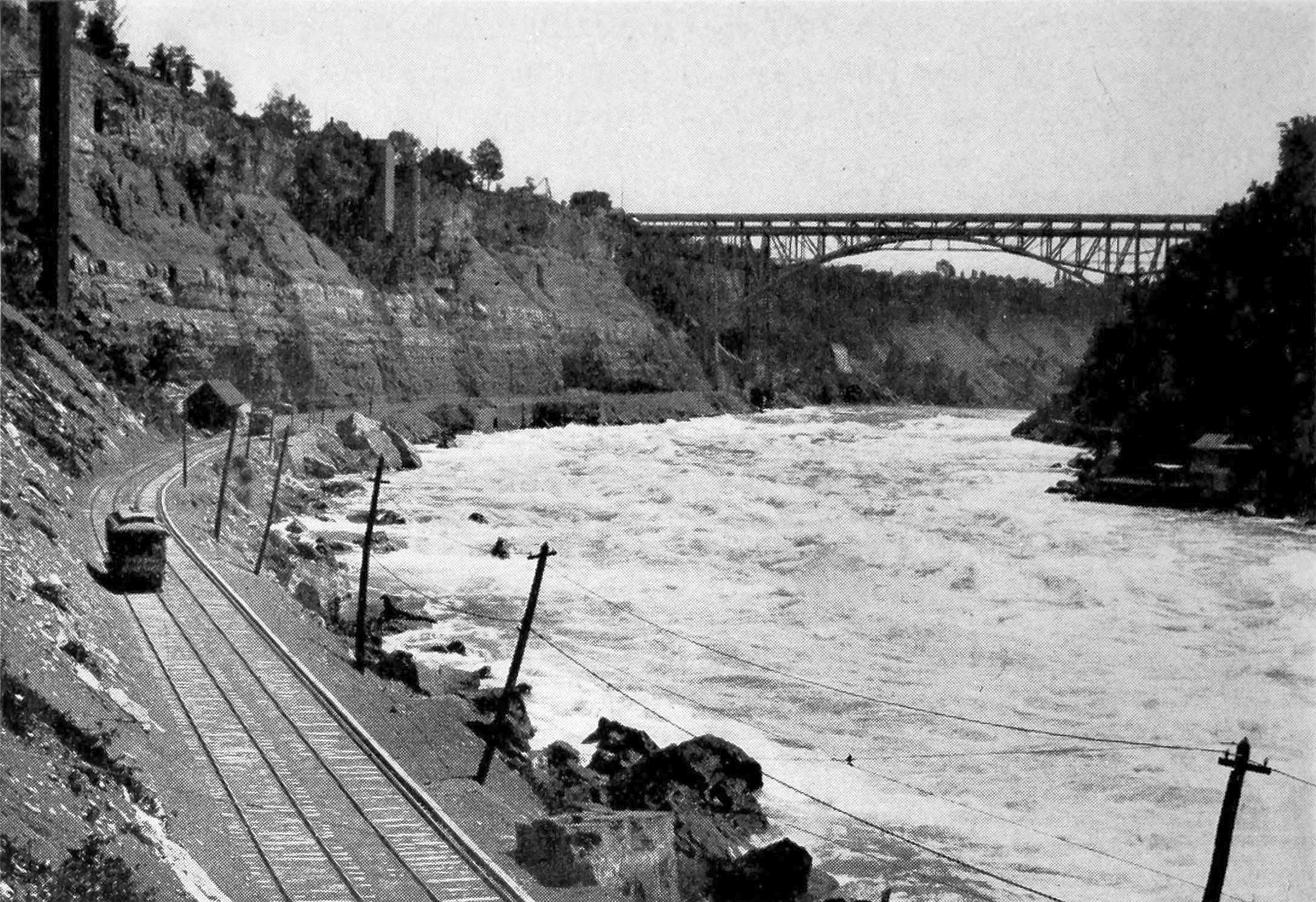
Niagara Gorge Railroad in 1913

The company furnished power to many of the largest factories and industrial companies in Niagara Falls, New York. Among the company's larger contracts for power is that for the Niagara Gorge Railroad, the Aluminum Company of America, The National Electrolytic Company, and many other large manufacturing interests in Niagara Falls.

As of 1908, officers of the company were George B. Mathews (president), William D. Olmsted (vice president) Arthur Schoellkopf (secretary and treasurer), Paul A. Schoellkopf (assistant secretary and treasurer), John L. Harper (chief engineer). The board of directors was composed of George B. Mathews, William D. Olmstead, Arthur Schoellkopf, Jacob F. Schoellkopf Jr., and J. L. Romer.

==== Cliff Electrical Distributing Company ====
The "Cliff Electrical Distributing Company," was an electrical corporation organized for the sole purpose of enabling the "Hydraulic Power Company" lawfully to distribute electric power. As of 1914, the main consumers of power from the "Hydraulic Power Company" were:

- Aluminum Company of America – about 70,000 horsepower
- Cliff Electrical Distributing Company – about 30,000–40,000 horsepower

Both the Aluminum Company of America and "Cliff Electrical Distributing Company" owned their electrical generators and electrical apparatus and the transmission machinery (the transmission lines which carry the power from the generators to the place where they use it) and the "Hydraulic Power Company" owned everything else.

In 1914, the directors of "Cliff Electrical Distributing Company" were: Peter P. Pfohl, Paul A. Schoellkopf, John Olmstead, C. P. Hugo Schoellkopf, and Jacob F. Schoellkopf Jr. The officers were: Peter P. Pfohl, president; Paul A. Schoellkopf, secretary and treasurer; and C. P. Hugo Schoellkopf, vice president.

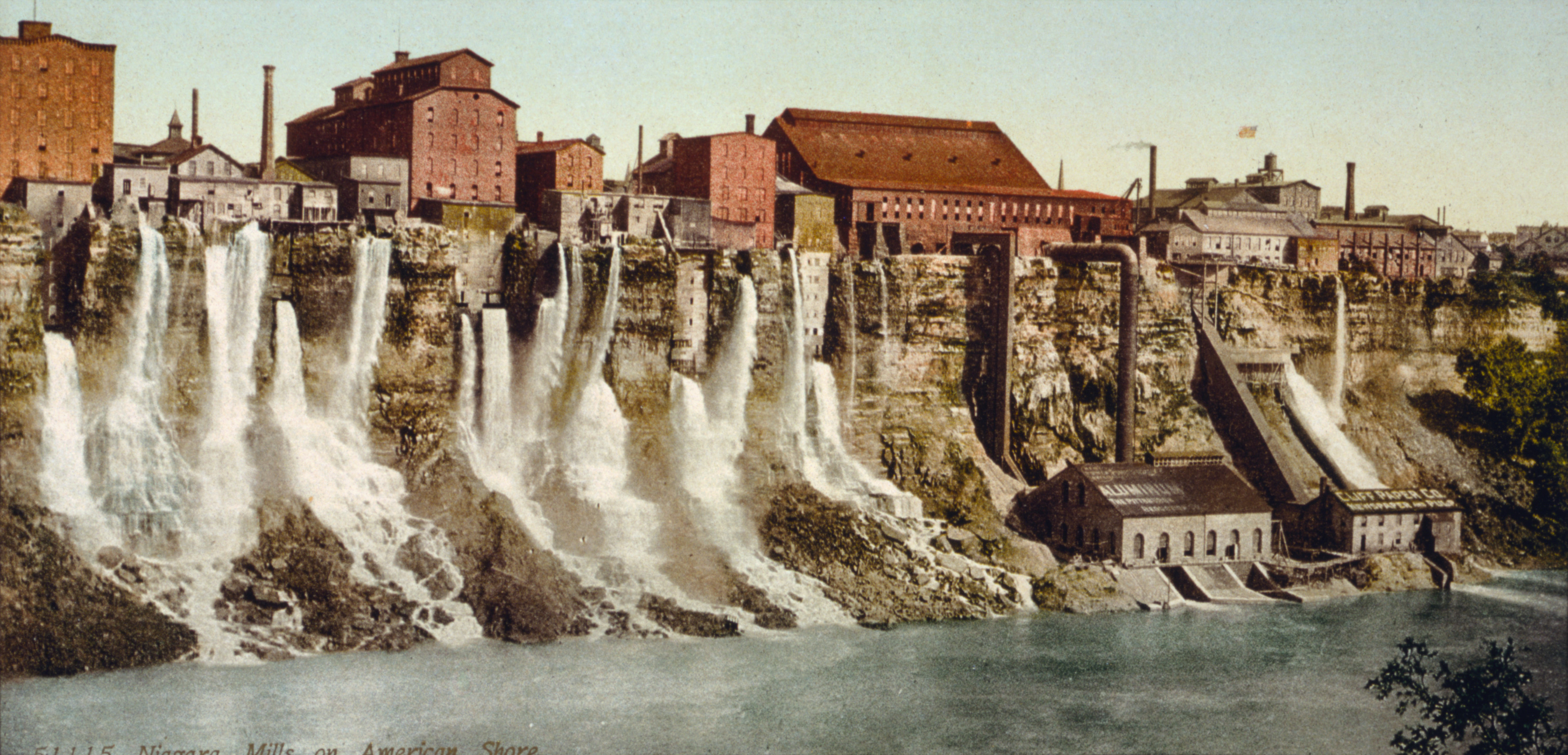
Schoellkopf mills along the canal in 1900

== Competitors ==
=== Niagara River Hydraulic Tunnel, Power, and Sewer Company ===
Schoellkopf's success in developing millsites led Charles B. Gaskill, of "Cataract City Milling Company", the canal's first customer in 1875, to believe that there would be a growing demand for power. Therefore, in 1886, Gaskill formed the "Niagara River Hydraulic Tunnel, Power, and Sewer Company" to meet the demand. His company hired engineer, Thomas Evershed, to create a plan to develop power.

Evershed planned to use the mechanical power of waterwheels and turbines rather than generating electricity. He proposed twelve canals to direct water from the upper Niagara River to remove power production from the River bank. The canals would feed 238 waterwheel pits with water plunging into the pit, rotating the turbine, and redirected through a huge tunnel into the gorge below the Falls. It was determined that Evershed's plan was too expensive, so Edward Dean Adams and others decided to develop hydro-electric power. New plans called for a central generating station and a shortened version of Evershed's tunnel.

=== Niagara Falls Power Company ===
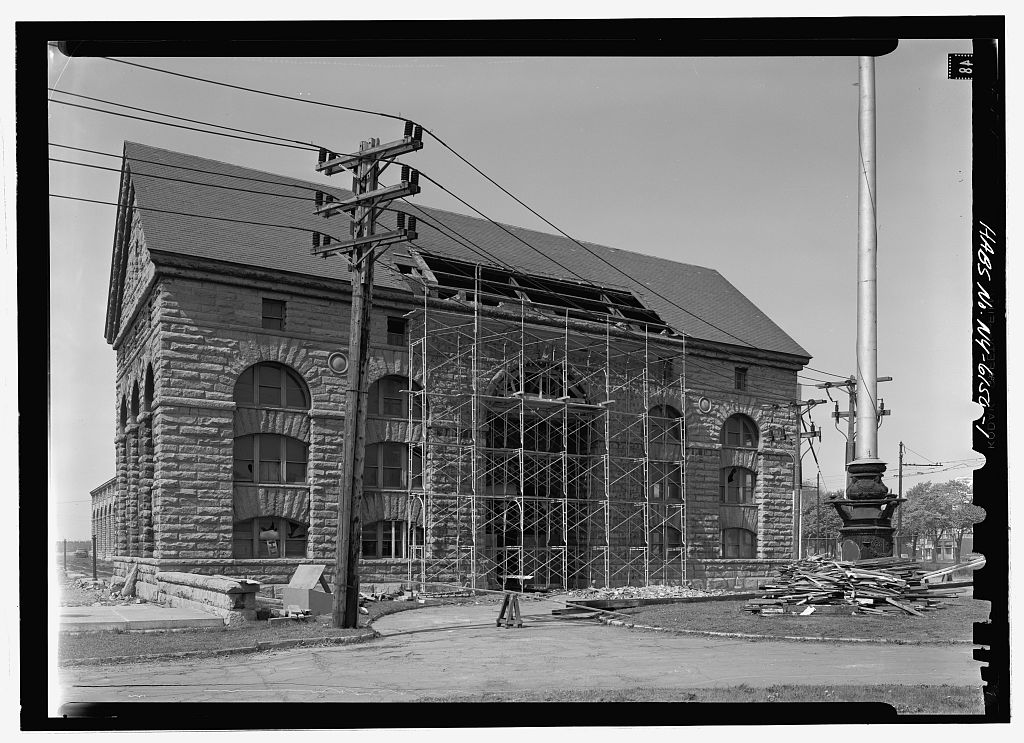
Edward Dean Adams Station Power Plant, Niagara River & Buffalo Avenue

In 1889, developers organized the "Niagara Falls Power Company" and the "Cataract Construction Company" (incorporated June 12, 1889) to carry out the new plan. Edward Dean Adams, as president of the "Cataract Construction Company," directed plans to construct a central generating plant and to solve the problem of transmitting electricity over long distances. Adams and the "Cataract Construction Company" began constructing a central power station immediately, however, the problem of how to transmit electricity long distance was not yet solved. On December 20, 1892, the Evershed tunnel and the Edward Dean Adam's power house inlet canal are completed. Therefore, the "Cataract Construction Company" sponsored the "International Niagara Commission", which met in London in June 1890 and was headed by Lord Kelvin. The commissioners offered a $100,000 (equivalent to $3,583,000 in 2025) prize for a solution to the problem. The commission received seventeen submissions from experts around the world only to reject them all. The schemes ranged from a system using pneumatic pressure to one requiring ropes, springs and pulleys. Some proposed transmitting direct current electricity, including one endorsed by Thomas Edison.

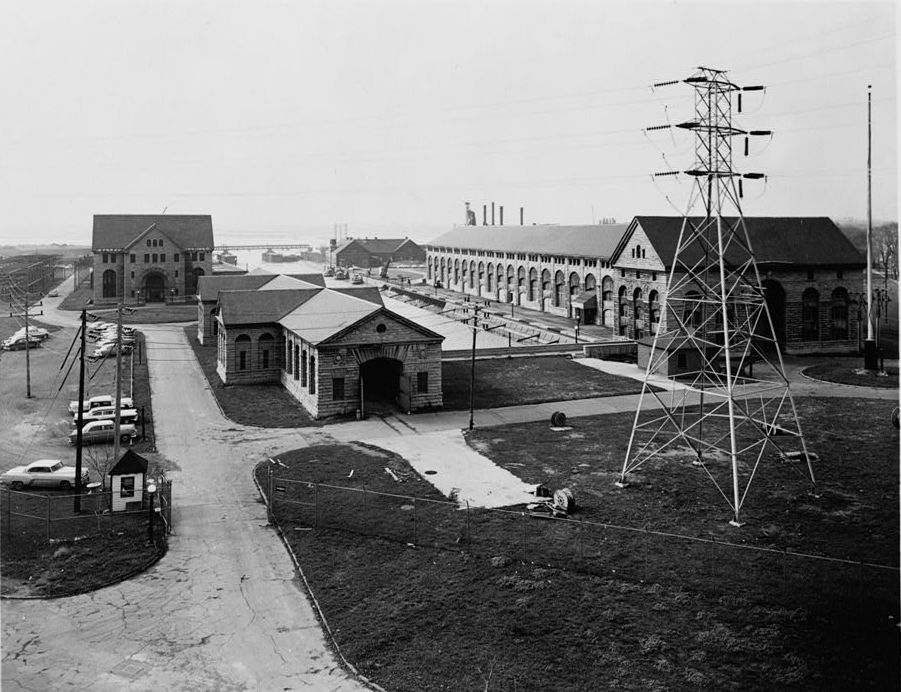
Edward Dean Adams Power Plant

On May 6, 1893, after the commission failed to award a winner, Lord Kelvin and the commission asked George Westinghouse to use alternating current to develop electricity at Niagara Falls. The construction lasted for several years and was funded by an interest composed of notable businessmen including: J. P. Morgan, John Jacob Astor IV, Lord Rothschild, and W. K. Vanderbilt. The Edward Dean Adams Power Plant, designed by McKim, Mead, and White, first produced power on August 26, 1895, and in November 1896, power generated from Niagara Falls reached Buffalo. The first 1,000 horsepower of electricity transmitted to Buffalo was claimed by the street railway company, with the local power company putting in orders for 5,000 more.

Similar to the "Hydraulic Power Company of Niagara Falls" arrangement with the "Cliff Electrical Distributing Company," the "Niagara Falls Power Company" sold power to the International Railway Company (w.streetcars in Buffalo & Niagara Falls city) which obtained the right to install its rotary converters in the Niagara Power Company's generating station, but paid nothing additional (i.e. rent) for the installation.

== Consolidation ==
In 1918, the "Cliff Electrical Distributing Company," the "Hydraulic Power Company of Niagara Falls," and the "Niagara Falls Power Company" merged due to government pressure for more efficient use of the Niagara River's water provided by the Boundary Waters Treaty of 1910. The consolidated company retained the name "Niagara Falls Power Company" and issued $26,000,000 (equivalent to $556,527,000 in 2025) capital stock, common and preferred. The $26 million in capital stock was consisted of

- $11,515,400 – 7% cumulative preferred capital stock
- $14,484,600 – common capital stock

The $11,515,400 in preferred stock was distributed to the shareholders of "Niagara Falls Power Company." Of the $14,484,600 in common capital stock:

- $540,000.00 – distributed to the shareholders of "Cliff Electrical Distributing Company"
- $984,566.70 – distributed to the shareholders of "Niagara Falls Power Company"
- $12,960,000 – distributed to the shareholders of "Hydraulic Power Company of Niagara Falls"

On March 2, 1921, the combined "Niagara Falls Power Company," secured a federal license from the Federal Power Commission, issued under the Federal Water Power Act of 1920 for a term of 50 years, that authorized the diversion of water for power purposes from the Niagara River, above Niagara Falls, and the return of it below the Falls, all in New York.

The "Niagara Falls Power Company" later became "Niagara Mohawk Power Corp." which was acquired by National Grid plc in 2002 for $3 billion (equivalent to $5.370028×10^{9} in 2025).

== See also ==
- List of New York companies
- Peter Porter
- Jacob F. Schoellkopf
- Schoellkopf Power Station
- List of Niagara Falls hydroelectric generating plants
