= Deveaux School Historic District =

Historic district in New York, United States

- U.S. National Register of Historic Places
- U.S. Historic district
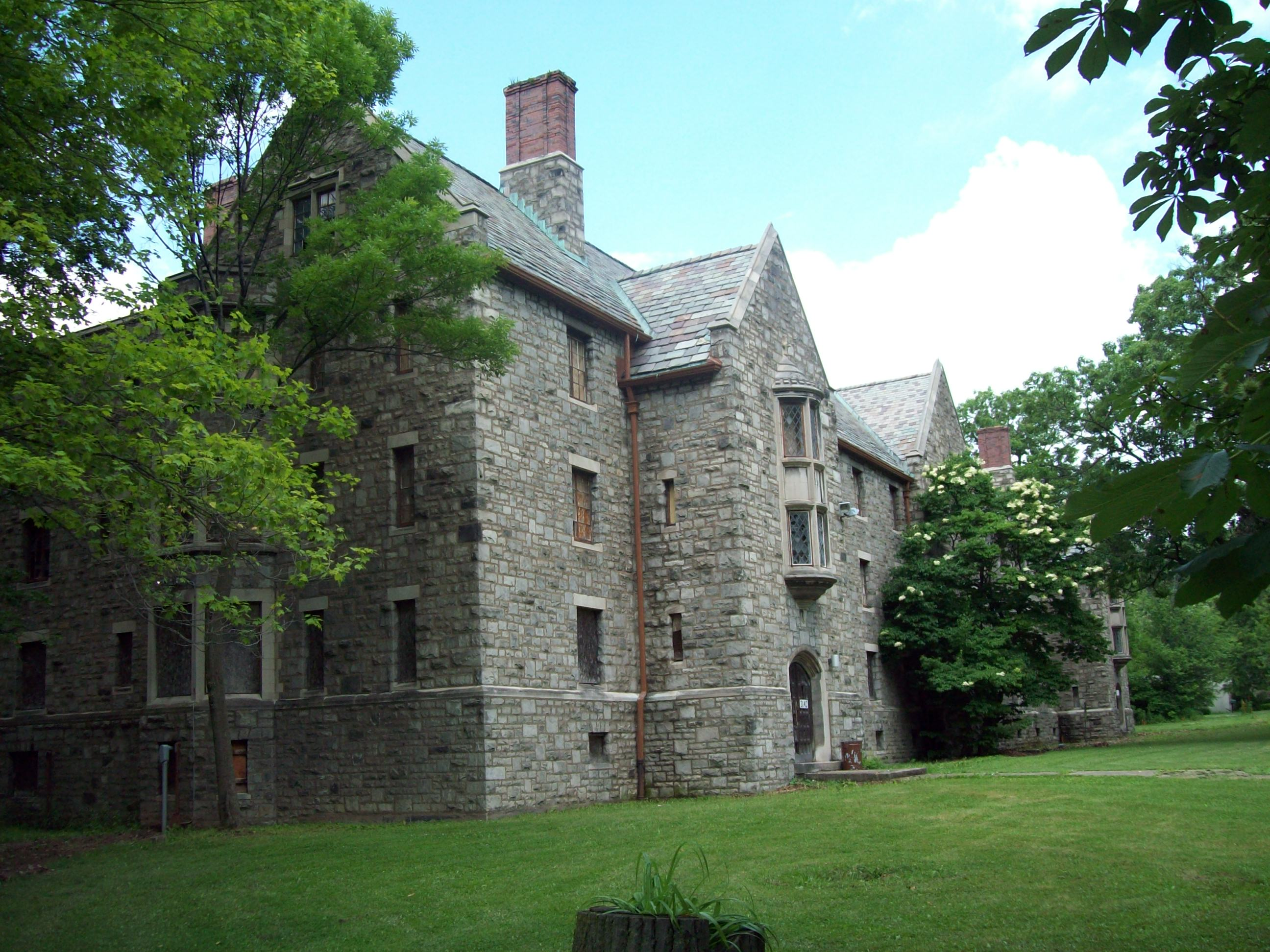
- Deveaux School Historic District, Schoellkopf Hall (1929), June 2009

- Location within New York Location within the United States
- Location: 2900 Lewiston Rd., Niagara Falls, New York
- Coordinates: 43°7′12″N 79°3′36″W
- Built: 1855
- Architect: Calvin N. Otis
- Architectural style: Gothic
- NRHP reference No.: 74001281
- Added to NRHP: June 5, 1974

Deveaux School Historic District is a national historic district located at Niagara Falls in Niagara County, New York.

== Beginnings ==
The property was deeded in the mid-1850s as “The DeVeaux College for Orphans and Destitute Children” by Judge Samuel DeVeaux and operated by the Episcopal Diocese of Western New York. Samuel DeVeaux (1789-1852) was a heavy contributor to the Lockport and Niagara Railroads, also known as the Strap Railroad and was instrumental in the construction of the Whirlpool Suspension Bridge in 1847. His business dealings resulted in vast purchases of land along the Niagara River. The entire region still bears his name.

Judge DeVeaux died suddenly on August 3, 1852, and being deeply religious and a sincere believer in the benefit of education, he left a portion of his estate for the benefit of Niagara Falls and the Episcopal Diocese to establish DeVeaux College. The college was located at the northern limits of the city and opposite the Whirlpool.

DeVeaux's vision was a preeminent institution of learning which would train young men in academics, trade professions and give them an education that did not neglect religious training. For nearly 80 years course work included mandatory military training with cadets dressed in uniforms in the tradition of the U.S. Military Academy at West Point, New York. The last day of military influence on campus came was on Founder's Day in 1950 when the uniforms were replaced by coats and ties.

Among the school's faculty was William C. Baker, professor of languages for two years, around 1882-1883. Baker was later elected mayor of Providence, Rhode Island.

== Campus buildings ==
Buildings on the property at one time included Van Rensselaer Hall, Monro Hall, Schoellkopf Hall, Edgewood, the Walker Residence, the Buscaglia-Castellani Art Gallery, a brick barn, boiler house, and three residential homes. The 51-acre site grew to encompass a campus of nearly a dozen buildings and residences.

The first building constructed was Van Rensselaer Hall, built in 1855-57 and dedicated on May 20, 1857 in honor of the Rev. Dr. Maunsell Van Rensselaer (1819–1900), older brother of Charles Van Rensselaer (1823–1857) and grandson of Killian K. Van Rensselaer (1763–1845), the second president of the school. Designed by Buffalo architect Calvin N. Otis, Van Rensselaer Hall was referred to as "the college edifice" and was three and a half stories built at a cost of $14,154. It consisted of the kitchen, dining room, pantries, laundry, and bathrooms on the ground level and school rooms, chapel, hospital, library, and president's rooms on the second level. The third floor contained the dormitory which accommodated about 25 boys. Additional dorms and a playroom were in the attic. In 1866 the building was expanded and a new kitchen, chapel, and study hall were added. This expansion was later named Patterson Hall after the second president of the school Rev. Dr. George H. Patterson.

The construction of Munro Hall in 1894 was an indication of expansion and lavish spending at Deveaux School. This new Gothic-inspired building cost $18,000 and was attached to Patterson Hall. Munro's major feature was a new and bigger chapel that occupied the entire second floor. "Edgewood", the Chaplain's house also dates to this era of expansion and was located at southeast of the complex.

== Years of decline ==
DeVeaux College fell on hard times as the demand for prep-school education continued to decline in the 20th century. The Episcopal Diocese ceased operations at the school and, in 1971, looked to another organization to accept the burden of taking care of the historic structures. DeVeaux College closed its doors in 1972.

Subsequent property owners or lessees included Niagara County, Niagara Falls, Niagara University, Board of Cooperative Educational Services, and Niagara County Community College. The property is currently owned by the New York State Office of Parks, Recreation and Historic Preservation, who christened the property De Veaux Woods State Park.

The property was listed on the National Register of Historic Places in 1974.

== Gallery ==
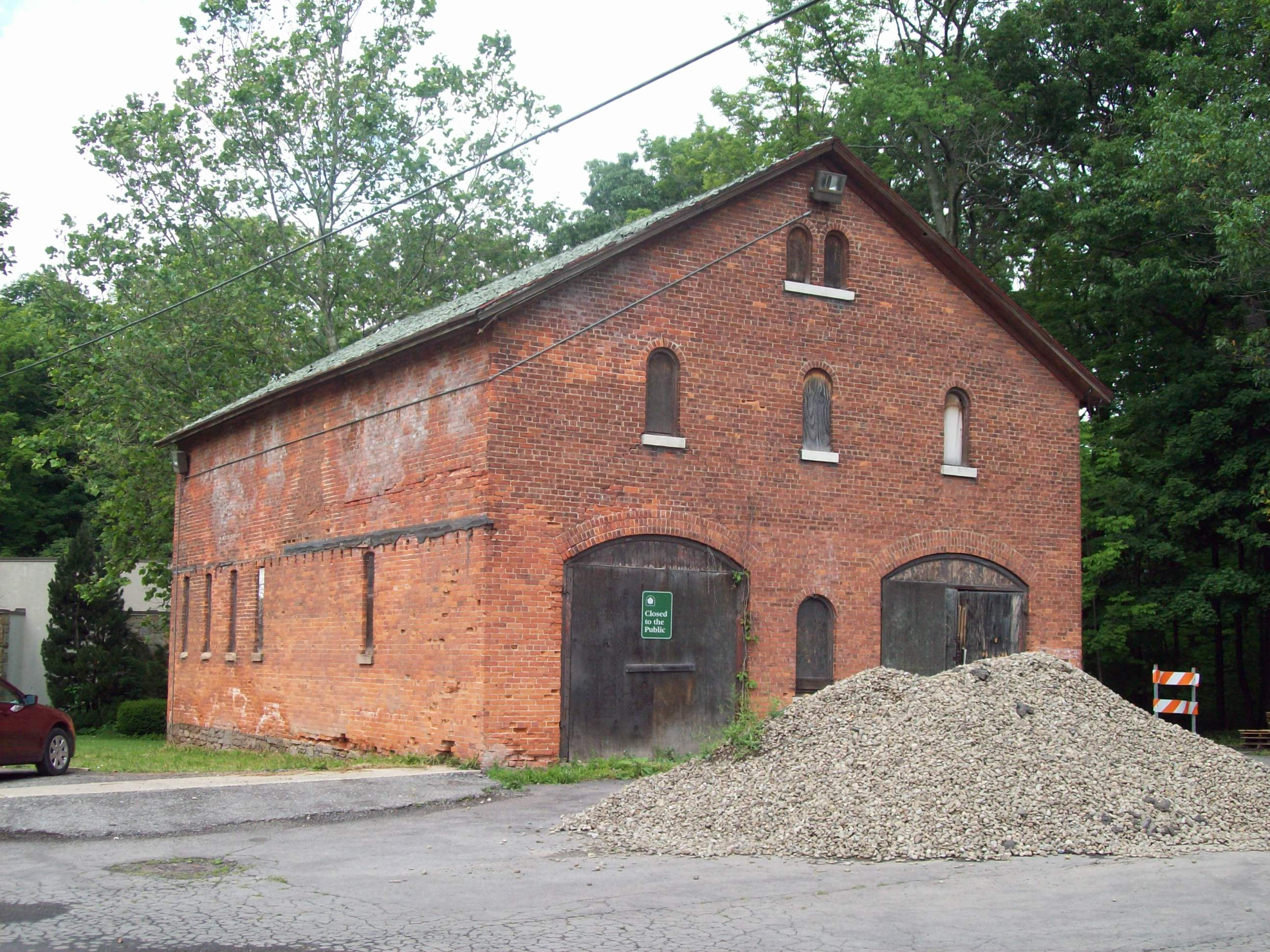
Deveaux School Historic District, Barn (1863), June 2009

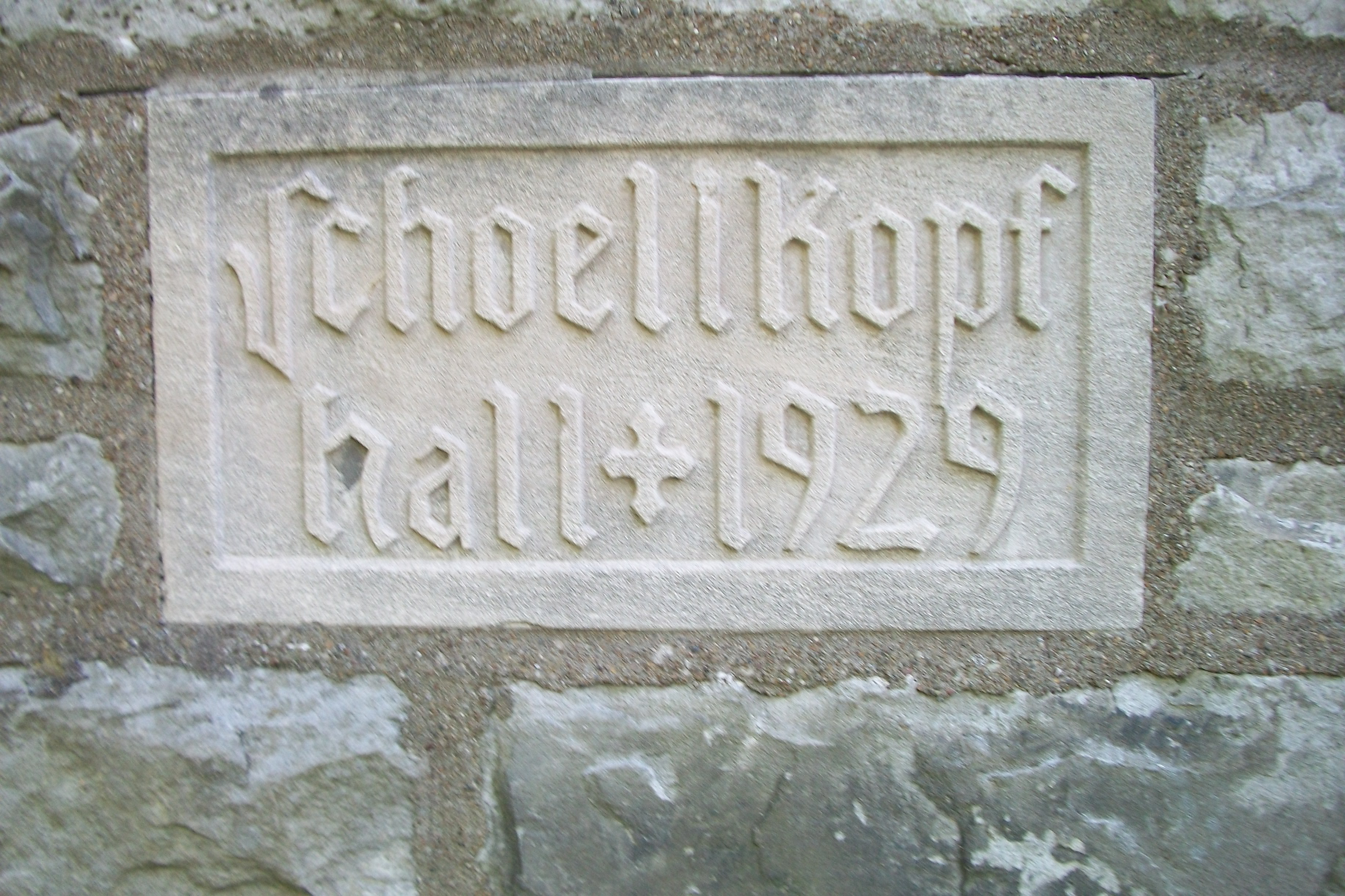
Year opened

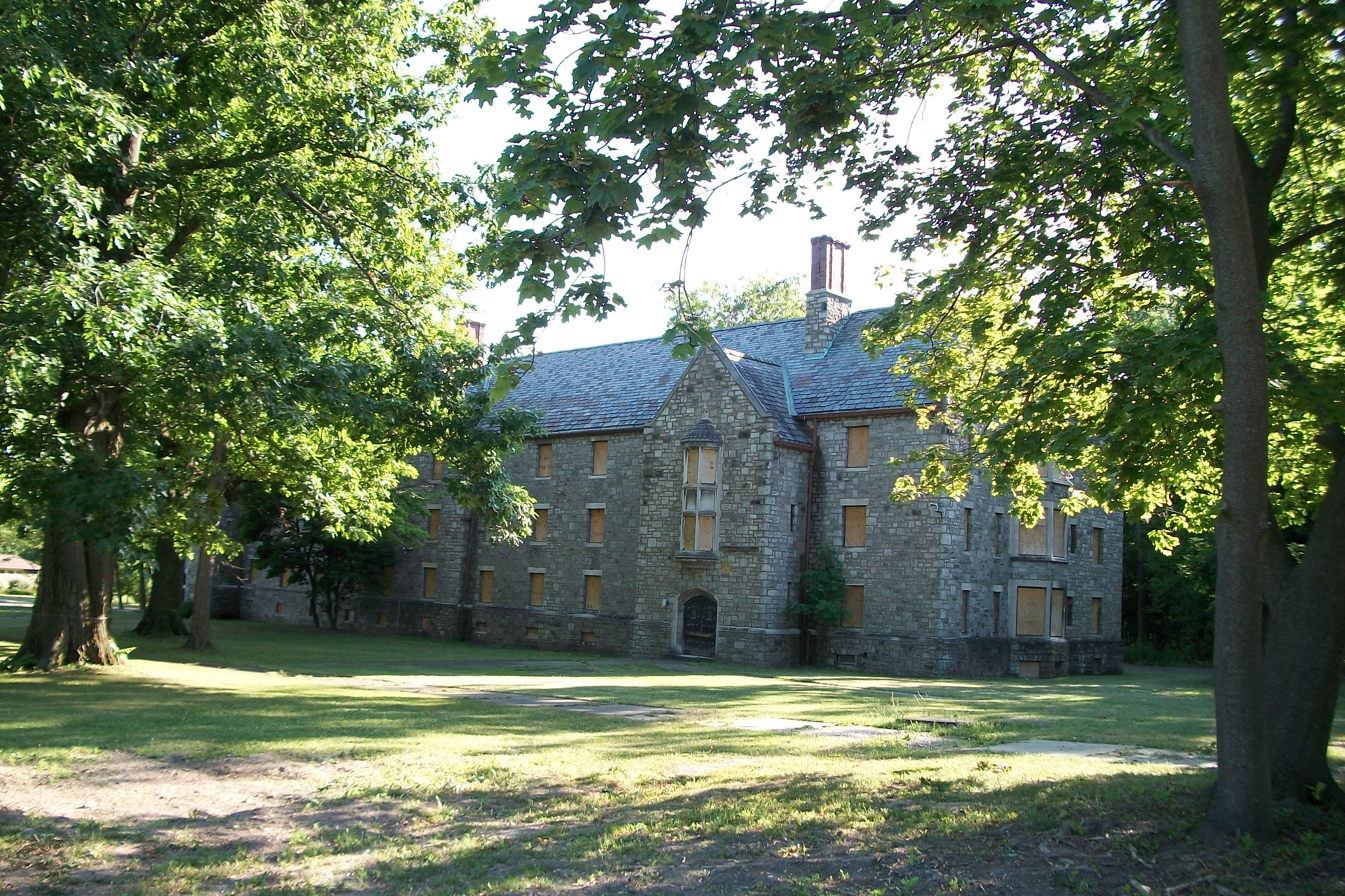
Schoellkopf Hall Front View

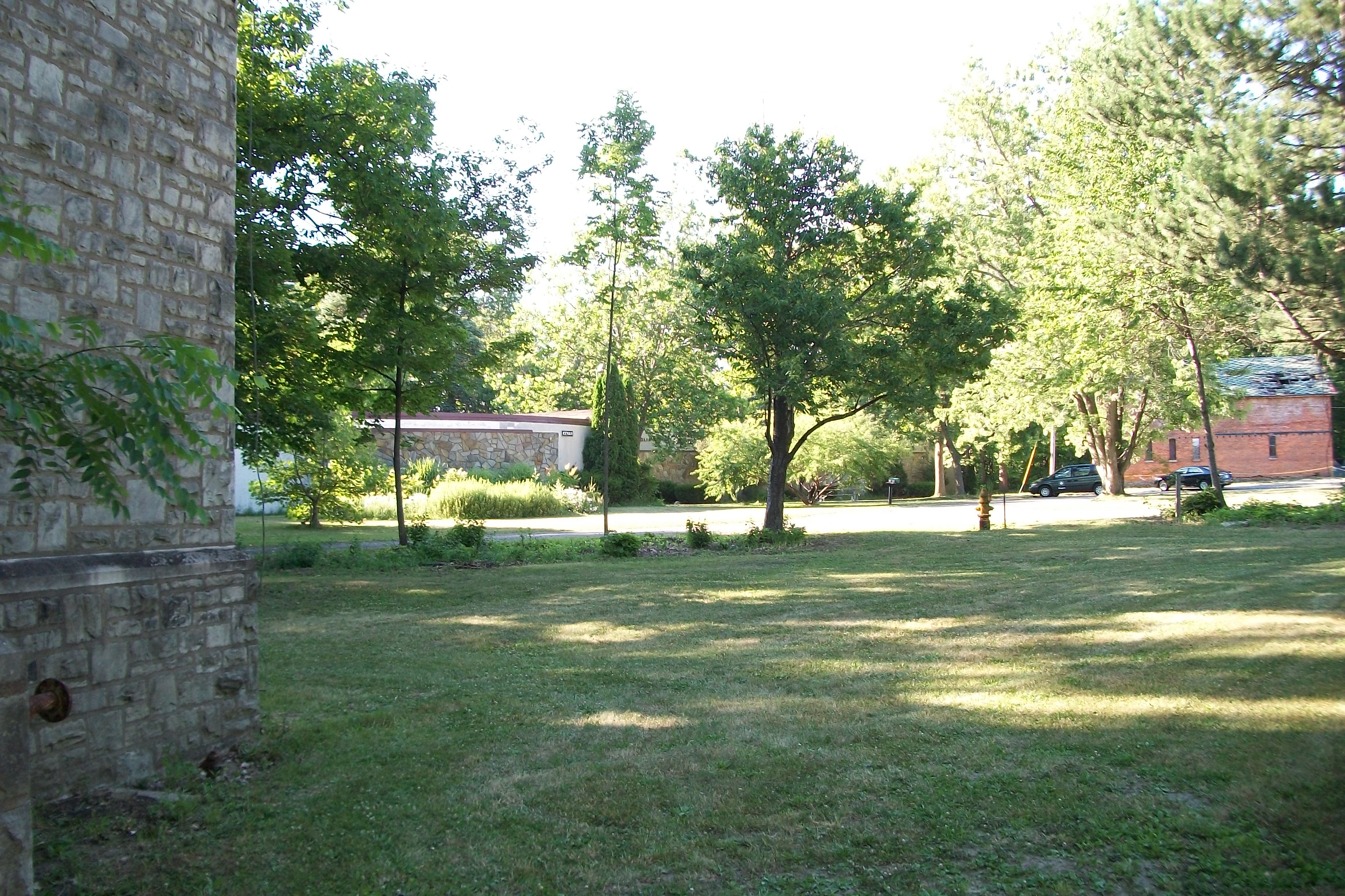
School grounds as state park June 2012

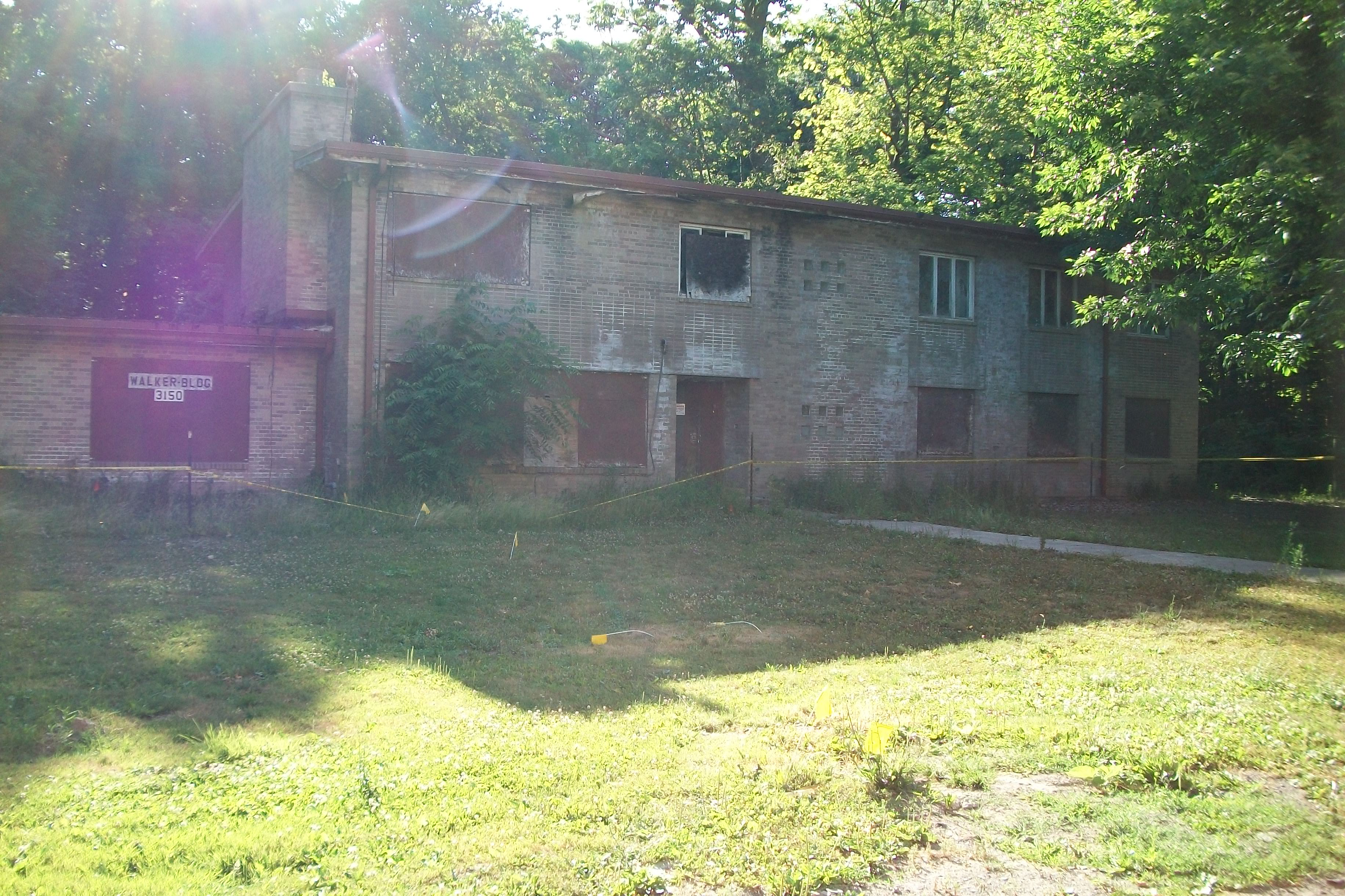
Dormitory (behind Schoellkopf Hall)

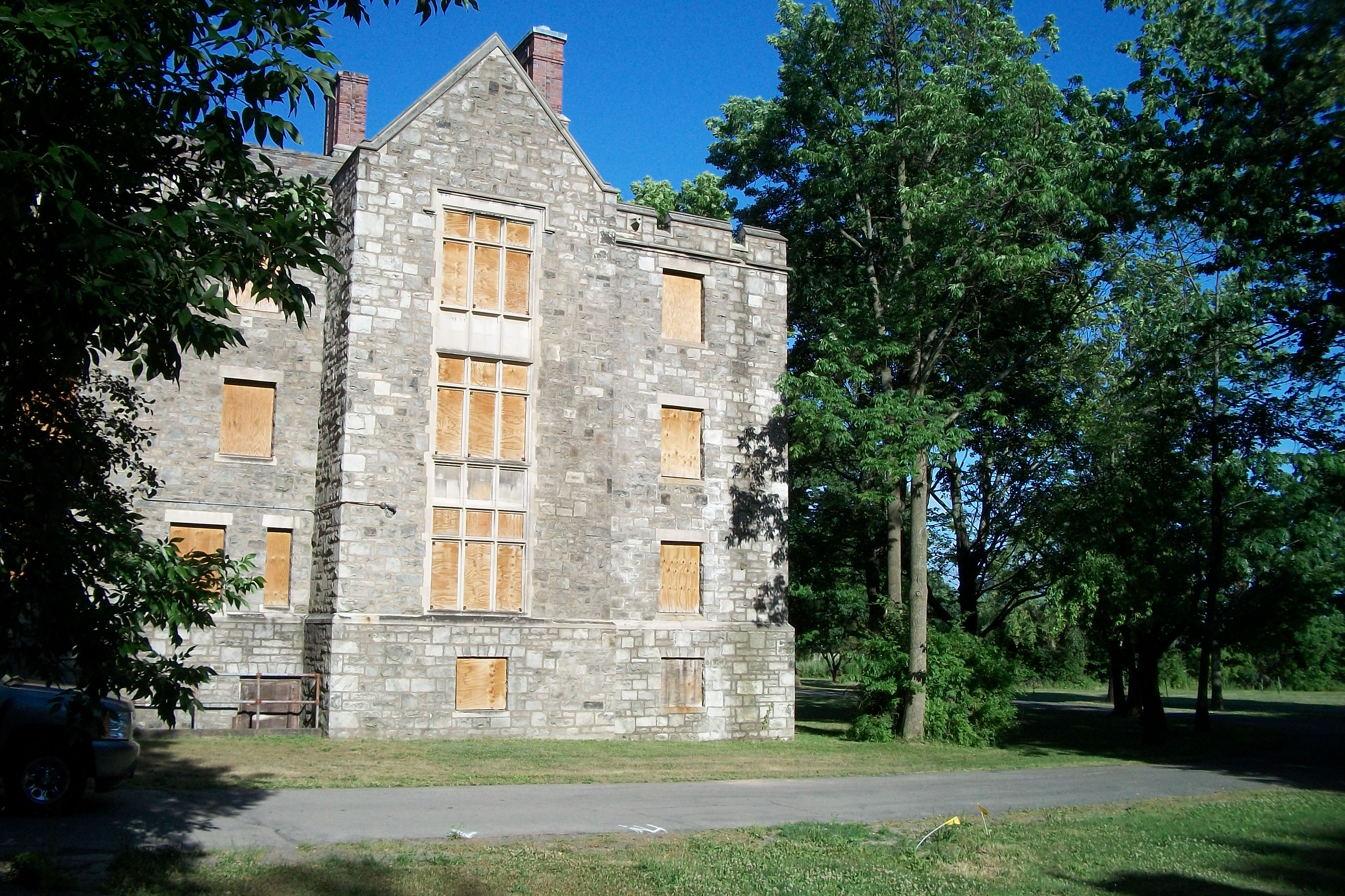
Schoellkopf rear view
