= Jacob F. Schoellkopf =

Jacob Friedrich Schoellkopf
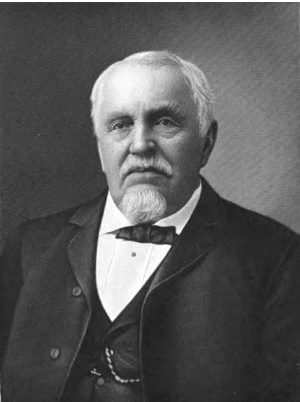
- Born: Jakob Friedrich Schöllkopf; November 15, 1819; Kirchheim unter Teck, Kingdom of Württemberg
- Died: September 15, 1899 (aged 79); Buffalo, New York, United States
- Resting place: Forest Lawn Cemetery
- Occupation: Business magnate
- Spouse: Christiana T. Duerr (m. 1848)
- Children: 7, including Arthur and Jacob

Signature
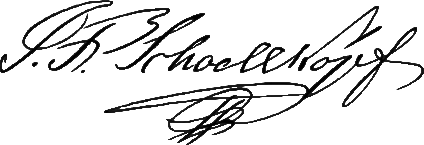

Jacob Friedrich Schoellkopf (November 15, 1819 – September 15, 1899) was a pioneer in harnessing the hydroelectric power of Niagara Falls.

== Early life ==
Jacob F. Schoellkopf was born on November 15, 1819, in Kirchheim Unter Teck, a small town in the Kingdom of Württemberg. He was the son of Gottlieb Schoellkopf and Christina Maier. He was educated in the town schools and at the age of 14 began learning about tanneries with his father, a large leather manufacturer, who had learned the trade from his father.

== Career ==
After completing five years of apprenticeship, he became clerk at a mercantile house in Strassberg where he worked for two years. In 1841, he decided to leave Germany and try his fortune in the United States. He landed in New York City at 22 years old in December 1841, and was "totally unacquainted with the English language."

=== Tannery ===
He started working in New York City and after two years, headed West to earn more. In 1844, with $800 (equivalent to $28,000 in 2025) of capital loaned to him by his father, he moved to Buffalo, New York, to begin his own business in a small leather store which he established in Mohawk Street.

In 1844, he purchased a small tannery at Whites Corners (Hamburg), Erie County. In 1846, he started a sheep skin tannery in Buffalo. In 1848, he built a tannery in Milwaukee, Wisconsin, in association with his cousin Frederick Vogel and the firm, "G. Pfister & Co."

In 1850, he became interested in the Chicago firm of "C. T. Gray & Company," operating a tannery there which continued until 1856. In 1852, he became a partner in Philip Ludwig "Louis" Breithaupt's Buffalo tanning business, eventually buying out Breithaupt's share in 1861. From 1853–54, he established tanneries at Fort Wayne, Indiana, and North Evans, New York, operating the latter for 20 years, and in 1857, he made his first large investment outside the tanning business, erecting the "North Buffalo Flouring Mills," which proved so profitable that he continued his investments with flour mills, ultimately becoming one of the largest operators of flouring mills in the Empire State.

In 1870, he bought the "Frontier Mills of Buffalo," and later erected extensive mills in Niagara Falls, New York. He did not retain many of these interests long after setting them up. His approach was to ensure they were successful and sell them at a profit to enable him to seek out new outlets for his increasing capital. However, he owned the later milling and tanning interests until his death, some being held in his own name and others as senior of the milling firm of "Schoellkopf & Matthews."

=== Hydroelectric power ===
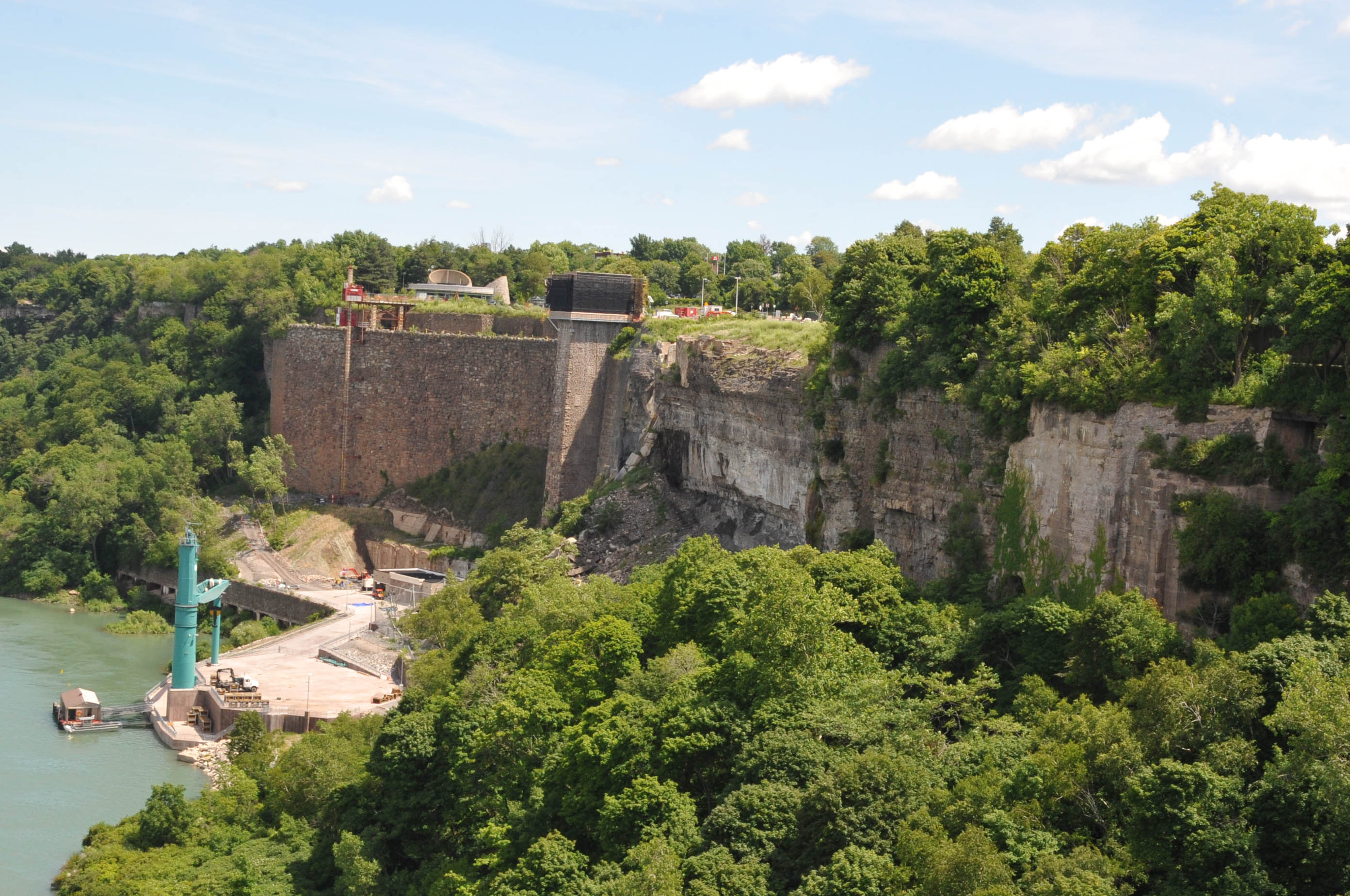
Schoellkopf Power Station No. 3 Site in 2008

In 1877, when the Niagara Falls Canal Company went bankrupt, Schoellkopf purchased the hydraulic canal at Niagara Falls at auction for $71,000, (equivalent to $2,147,000 in 2025) in order to develop a plan for utilizing the power of the Niagara River. The canal was later conveyed to a corporation known as The Niagara Falls Hydraulic Power & Manufacturing Company, which by 1882 was the first company to generate electricity from Niagara Falls.

He improved the canal and put the powerhouse to commercial use. In 1881, the company completed Schoellkopf Power Station No. 1 (which would operate until 1904). By 1882, Schoellkopf had seven mills along the high bank (the top edge of the Niagara Gorge north of the American Falls) all producing power from the hydraulic canal which made Schoellkopf incredibly wealthy. In 1891, Schoellkopf Power Station No. 2 opened directly in front of the original, in the gorge below Niagara Falls, with a higher 210-foot (64 m) drop. In 1904, the company built Schoellkopf Stations No. 3A and 3B. Schoellkopf was president of the company at the time of his death, after which each son found a place in Schoellkopf's various business ventures.

The Niagara Falls Hydraulic Power & Manufacturing Company was later shortened to "The Hydraulic Power Company," and during World War I, the company was consolidated with the Niagara Falls Power Company, owned by Edward Dean Adams, under the latter name, but with the Schoellkopf interests predominating, an enterprise involving some $62,000,000 (equivalent to $1,327,102,000 in 2025).

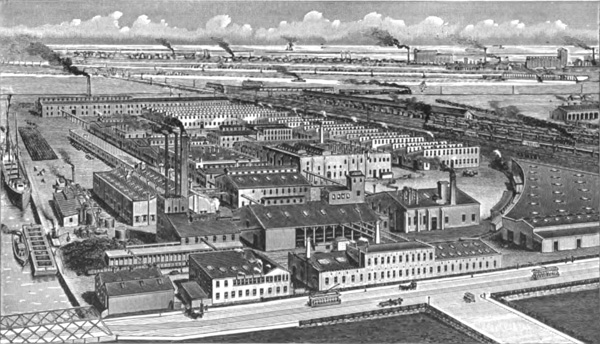
Schoellkopf, Hartford & Hanna Co. works in Buffalo, New York, formerly the Schoellkopf Aniline and Chemical Works, c. 1908

Following the formation of the Niagara Falls Power Company in 1918, Schoellkopf Jr. was elected chairman of the board for the corporation, a position that he held for eighteen years. Jacob Frederick III, Paul Arthur (the son of Arthur Schoellkopf), and other third-generation members of the family also continued to be involved as directors and stockholders of the company. In 1929, they organized the Niagara Share Corporation as a trust for all the stock owned by family members. The company continued to hold stock in the power utility until 1956.

=== Other business ventures ===
In 1867, he was on the Board of Directors for "Buffalo German Insurance Company" along with Henry Persch and William Hellriegel. He served as the vice president of the "Third National Bank of Buffalo", and was on the boards of "Merchant Bank of Buffalo", "The German Bank of Buffalo" and "Farmer and Merchant's National Bank." In 1879, Schoellkopf started the "Schoellkopf Chemical and Dye Company" for his two sons. In 1882, he was president of Buffalo's Board of Trade. In the 1880s and 1890s, he served as a trustee for the Bank of Niagara and the Power City Bank, both in Niagara Falls, New York. He also held the presidency and served as a director for the Citizens’ Gas Company of Buffalo along with serving as vice president of the Buffalo, New York & Philadelphia Railroad. Lastly, he served as a trustee for the Buffalo General Hospital.

== Personal life ==
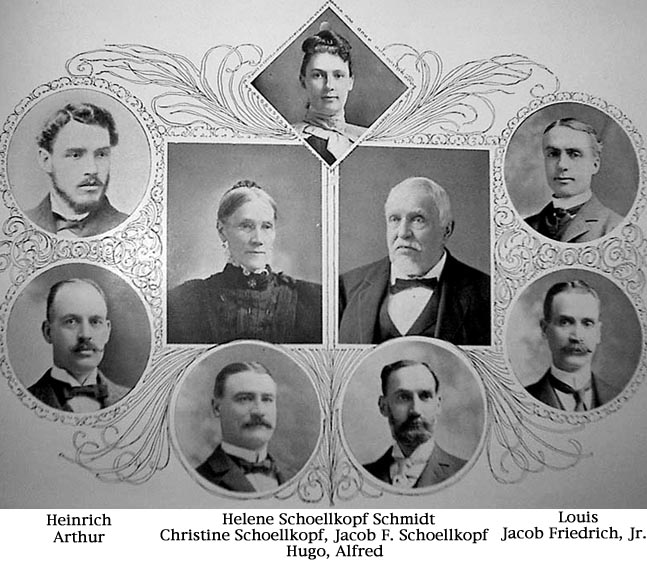
The Schoellkopf Family

In 1848, Schoellkopf married Sofie Christiane Duerr (1827–1903), who was also born in Germany and came to the United States in 1842. Four of his children died in infancy and two suffered health problems and died within two years of their father. Their children who lived to adulthood were:

- Henry Schoellkopf (1848–1880), who married Emily Vogel in 1875.
- Louis Schoellkopf (1855–1901), who married Myra Lee Horton (1861–1910).
- Arthur Schoellkopf (1856–1913), who served as the 5th mayor of Niagara Falls
- Jacob F. Schoellkopf Jr. (1858–1942), who married Wilma Spring.
- Alfred Schoellkopf (1860–1901), who married Emily R. Graebe (1869–1951).
- Charles Philip Hugo Schoellkopf (1862–1928), who married Emily F. Annette of Fort Lee, New Jersey.
- Helen Schoellkopf (1870–1962), who married Hans Schmidt (president of "J.F. Schoellkopf Co.")

Schoellkopf died "one of Buffalo's wealthiest and best known citizens" in Buffalo, New York on September 15, 1899. Christiana died four years later on October 13, 1903.

=== Legacy ===
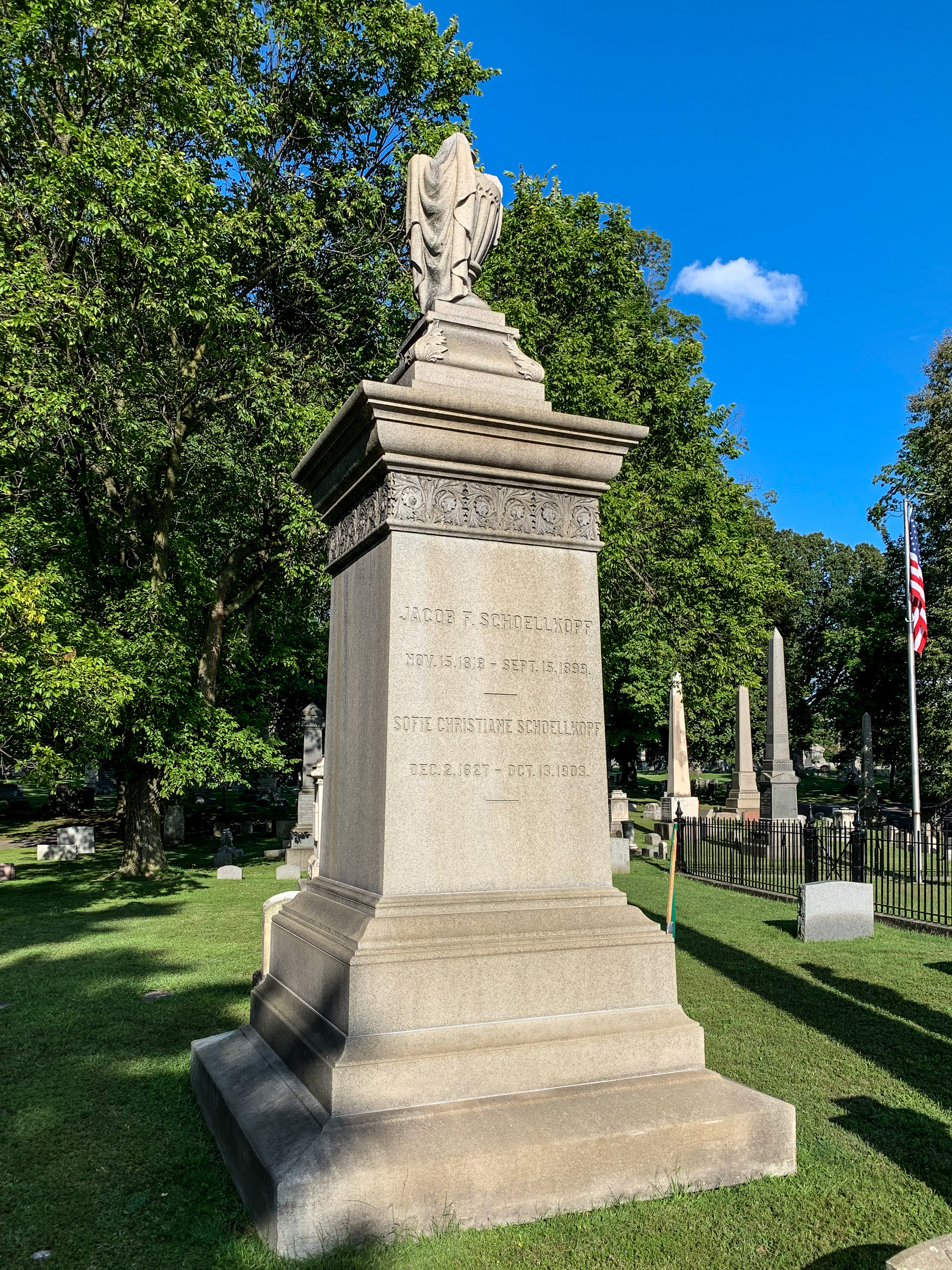
Schoellkopf's grave in Forest Lawn Cemetery

The Schoellkopfs lived in a large mansion at 553 Delaware Avenue at Allen Street on the southeast corner. Their daughter, Helena, who married Hans Schmidt, and their three children lived in the mansion until they moved to a new mansion in Derby, New York, in 1914. The house was sold to Harlow C. Curtiss, who transformed the home into a boarding house.

- In September 1906, the bridge last built over the hydraulic canal at Third street was named the "Schoellkopf Bridge" and at a public ceremonial on December 9, 1908, during the administration of Mayor Anthony C. Douglass, the "Schoellkopf Memorial Tablets" on that bridge were unveiled in his honor.
- Schoellkopf Field, a 25,000-seat stadium in Ithaca, New York, on the campus of Cornell University, bears Schoellkopf's name; his grandson Henry had played and coached at Cornell.
- In 1930, Jacob F. Schoellkopf Jr. endowed the "Jacob F. Schoellkopf Medal", the oldest award given by any local section, that recognizes a person who has fostered the objectives or activities of the American Chemical Society. The medalist's contribution may be a discovery pertaining to chemistry, or an invention of a plan, process, or device, useful, valuable, or significant in the theory or practice of chemistry, or distinguished service to the Western New York Section.

== See also ==
- Arthur Schoellkopf (1856 – 1913)
- Jacob F. Schoellkopf Jr. (1819 – 1899)
- Henry Schoellkopf Reuss (1912 – 2002)
- Henry Schoellkopf (1879 – 1912)
- Paul A. Schoellkopf (1884 – 1947)
- Frederick Vogel (1823 – 1892)
- Schoellkopf Power Station
- Niagara Falls Hydraulic Power & Manufacturing Company
