= Niagara Gorge Discovery Center =

Geological museum in Niagara Falls State Park, New York, USA

Coordinates: 43.0935°N 79.0622°W

The Niagara Gorge Discovery Center, also known as the Schoellkopf Geological Museum, was a museum within Niagara Falls State Park and the city of Niagara Falls, New York. It opened in 1971. Its role was to showcase the natural history of the Falls and the Niagara Gorge via the ancient rock layers and minerals. The museum also showcased the history of the Great Gorge Route trolley line and featured a number of hiking trails.

The museum's location was where the Schoellkopf Power Station, one of the first hydroelectric plants in the United States, stood until it was destroyed by rockfall in 1956.

The museum closed in 2020 due to the COVID-19 pandemic and never reopened.

In 2024, the vacant building was repurposed as an expansion of the Aquarium of Niagara, which is located nearby. The removal of the Robert Moses State Parkway (and part of Whirlpool Street), which formerly separated the two buildings, allowed them to become part of the same campus. The expansion is called Great Lakes 360 and focuses on the wildlife of the Niagara River and the larger Great Lakes ecosystem.
