= Niagara Falls Memorial Medical Center =

Geography
- Location: Niagara Falls, New York
- Coordinates: 43.09388°N 79.04987°W

Organisation
- Affiliated university: Not-for-profit

Services
- Beds: 171 patient beds and 120-bed extended care facility

History
- Opened: 1895

Links
- Website: www.nfmmc.org

Niagara Falls Memorial Medical Center is a hospital in downtown Niagara Falls in the state of New York, founded in 1895, that has been serving the Greater Niagara region for over 100 years.

== History ==
The hospital began as a small emergency hospital in 1895 to serve the Niagara Falls region and has since evolved into a full-service, 171-bed medical center consisting of all-private rooms offering inpatient and outpatient services including:

- The Heart Center of Niagara
- Diabetes & Endocrinology Center of Niagara
- University Sports Medicine of Niagara.

Memorial is Niagara's safety net hospital for the medically underserved, uninsured and underinsured, annually providing some $6.5 million in uncompensated and charity care. It was the first hospital in Niagara to be accredited as a stroke center by the New York State Department of Health.

Memorial operate several satellite facilities including the Summit Healthplex and Tuscarora Health Center as well as the Schoellkopf Health Center, a 120-bed skilled nursing facility that features 100-percent private room accommodations and specializes in short-term rehabilitation and elder care.

Memorial's Child Advocacy Center of Niagara enjoys national accreditation.

As one of the Greater Niagara region's largest employers, Niagara Falls Memorial plays an active role as an economic engine and a catalyst for community growth. Since 2003, Memorial has made $62 million in capital improvements to its downtown Niagara Falls campus.

== Programs offered ==
Wellness Programs:

- Community Health Worker Program
- Niagara Health Home
- Project Runway
- CPR Classes
- Cardiac Rehabilitation
- Pulmonary Rehabilitation
- Living with Diabetes
- Breastfeeding Support Group
- Parkinson's Disease Support Group
- Breast Cancer Support Group
- Bariatric Surgery Support Group

Childbirth and Parenting Education Programs:

- Childbirth Classes
- Breastfeeding Classes

Speakers Bureau—Community Presentations

== The Family Medicine Residency Program ==
The Family Medicine Residency Program has been in existence for 30 years and was founded by Dr. Melvin B. Dyster, M.D., who was active in the program until he died in April 2021. It is affiliated with the Lake Erie College of Osteopathic Medicine and operates under the direction of Jeffrey O. Burnett, D.O.

At Niagara Falls Memorial, residents work closely with board-certified physicians and faculty members. In addition to completing clinical rotations at the medical center, residents use the center's mobile clinic to provide care to migrant workers at nearby farms. They also see patients on an outpatient basis at Memorial's Summit Family Health Center, the Niagara University Health Clinic and the Tuscarora Indian Reservation Health Center.

== Accreditation ==
The Medical Center is accredited by the Healthcare Facilities Accreditation Program. The Intersocietal Accreditation Commission has accredited the "Adult Transthoracic Echocardiography and Adult Stress Echocardiography." The American Association of Cardiovascular and Pulmonary Rehabilitation has accredited the center for Cardiac Rehabilitation. In addition, the American College of Radiology has accredited the center for:

- Magnetic Resonance Imaging (MRI) – Summit Healthplex
- Computerized Tomography (CT) – The Heart Center of Niagara
- Computerized Tomography (CT) – Summit Healthplex
- Nuclear Medicine – The Heart Center of Niagara
- Nuclear Medicine – Summit Healthplex
- Mammography – Memorial Medical Center
- Mammography – Summit Healthplex
