= De Veaux Woods State Park =

State park in Niagara County, New York

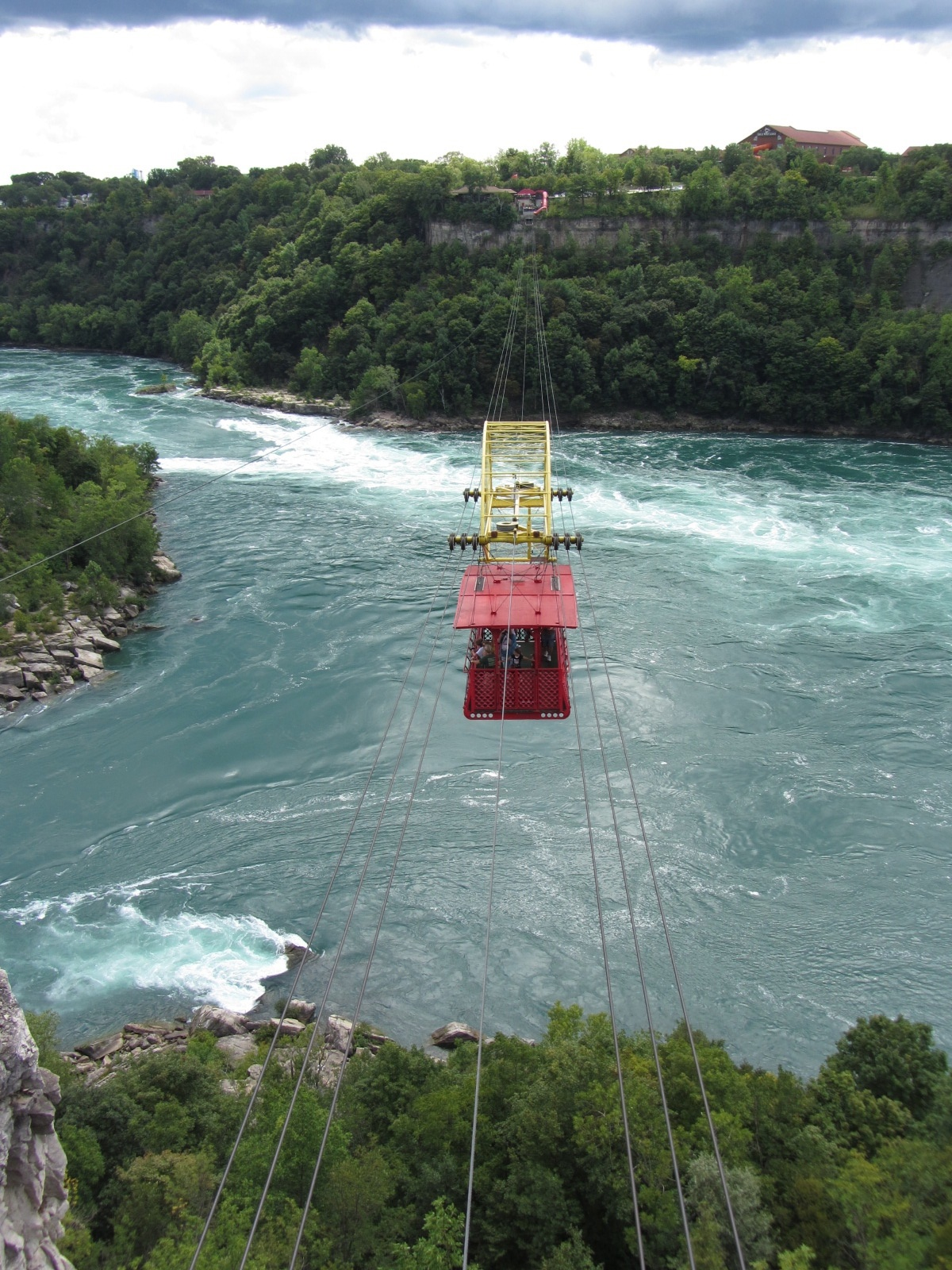
- Tram Ending at Whirlpool State Park, August 2012

- Location within New York
- Interactive map of De Veaux Woods State Park
- Type: State park
- Location: 2900 Lewiston Road; Niagara Falls, New York
- Nearest city: Niagara Falls, New York
- Coordinates: 43°7′7″N 79°3′33″W
- Area: 51 acres (0.21 km^{2})
- Created: 2001
- Operator: New York State Office of Parks, Recreation and Historic Preservation
- Visitors: 90,202 (in 2014)
- Open: All year
- Website: De Veaux Woods State Park

De Veaux Woods State Park is a 51-acre (0.21 km^{2}) state park located in Niagara County, New York, USA. The park is located off the Niagara Scenic Parkway, north of the City of Niagara Falls. It is adjacent to Whirlpool State Park.

== History ==
The park's land was originally part of the DeVeaux College for Orphans and Destitute Children, for which construction began in 1855. DeVeaux College operated as a trade school for boys ages 8 to 12 and was referred to as a "military school" for much of its existence. The school closed in 1972, and the property was used as dormitories for Niagara University between 1978 and 1983. Many of the property's buildings were demolished in 1994, and the New York State Office of Parks, Recreation and Historic Preservation acquired the property in 2001.

== Park description ==
The park has baseball diamonds, a playground, an ice skating rink, a nature trail, seasonal restrooms, a dog park, and permits biking. A small area of old growth forest is present inside the park. The park is also the home of the New York State Parks Niagara Regional Offices.

The park is open year-round for daytime activities.

== See also ==
- List of New York state parks
