= Henry Schoellkopf =

American football player and coach (1879–1912)

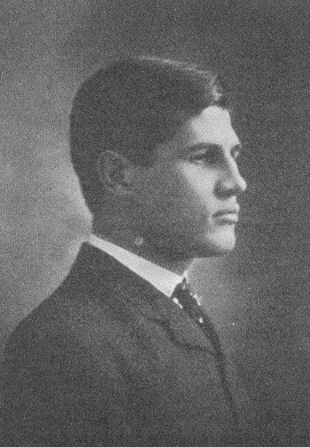
- Henry Schoellkopf c. 1907

Biographical details
- Born: December 14, 1879; Buffalo, New York, U.S.
- Died: December 5, 1912 (aged 32); Milwaukee, Wisconsin, U.S.
- Education: Cascadilla School; Cornell University; Harvard Law School

Playing career
- 1900–1901: Cornell
- 1903: Harvard
- Positions: Fullback, halfback

Coaching career (HC unless noted)
- 1907–1908: Cornell

Head coaching record
- Overall: 15–3–1

Accomplishments and honors

Awards
- Third-team All-American (1901)

Henry Schoellkopf (December 14, 1879 – December 5, 1912) was an American football player and coach. He was selected as an All-American fullback while attending Harvard Law School in 1903. He was the head coach of the Cornell Big Red football team from 1907 to 1908, compiling a record of 15–3–1.

== Early life ==
Henry Schoellkopf was born December 14, 1879, in Buffalo, New York, to Henry Schoellkopf Sr. (1848–1880) and Emily Vogel. Henry Sr. was the oldest son of Buffalo, New York, businessman Jacob F. Schoellkopf and his wife, Christiana T. (Duerr) Schoellkopf. Henry's father learned the tannery business and leather trade from Henry's grandfather, Jacob F. Schoellkopf, and later worked with Jacob's cousin and business partner, Frederick Vogel and his business partner, Guido Pfister, in Wisconsin. Henry Sr. married Vogel's daughter, Emelie (Emily) Vogel (Henry's mother) in 1875. Prior to his father's early death in 1880, he partnered with Vogel and Pfister and opened a tannery in northeast Wisconsin that eventually "became the largest in the world prior to World War I." Henry would grow up to become the first of many Schoellkopfs to attend Cornell University when he enrolled in 1898. His sister, Paula Schoellkopf (b. 1876) married Gustav A. Reuss who had Henry Schoellkopf Reuss (1912–2002).

He attended Cornell University, graduating with a Bachelor of Arts degree in 1902. While at Cornell, he was president of both the Quill and Dagger society and the Zeta Psi fraternity. Henry received a law degree from Harvard University, where he continued to play football. Returning to Cornell, he served as a graduate coach before leaving to enter a law firm in Milwaukee, Wisconsin.

== Career ==
Schoellkopf began his career as a football player at the Cascadilla School, where he played fullback. He then enrolled at Cornell and played college football for the Cornell Big Red football team from 1900 to 1901, contributing to the development of the original Slope Day iteration. After graduating from Cornell in 1902, Schoellkopf enrolled at Harvard Law School where he played for the Harvard Crimson football team while he was a second-year law student at Harvard in 1903. He played principally at the fullback position and some at the halfback position. While playing at Harvard, Schoellkopf was 23 years old, 5 feet 10 inches tall, and weighed 183 pounds. After the 1903 college football season, Schoellkopf was selected as a first-team All-American fullback by Fielding H. Yost, Charles Chadwick, and the San Antonio Daily Light.

In 1907 and 1908, after graduating from Law School, he served as the head coach of Cornell's football team. In two years as Cornell's coach, Schoellkopf compiled a record of 15 wins, three losses and one tie. His winning percentage of .816 ranks second all-time among Cornell coaches, trailing only Raymond Starbuck but ranking ahead of Pop Warner.

After coaching, Schoellkopf moved to Milwaukee, Wisconsin, where he became a member in the law firm of Marksam & Schoellkopf and one of the most well known attorneys in Milwaukee.

== Personal life ==
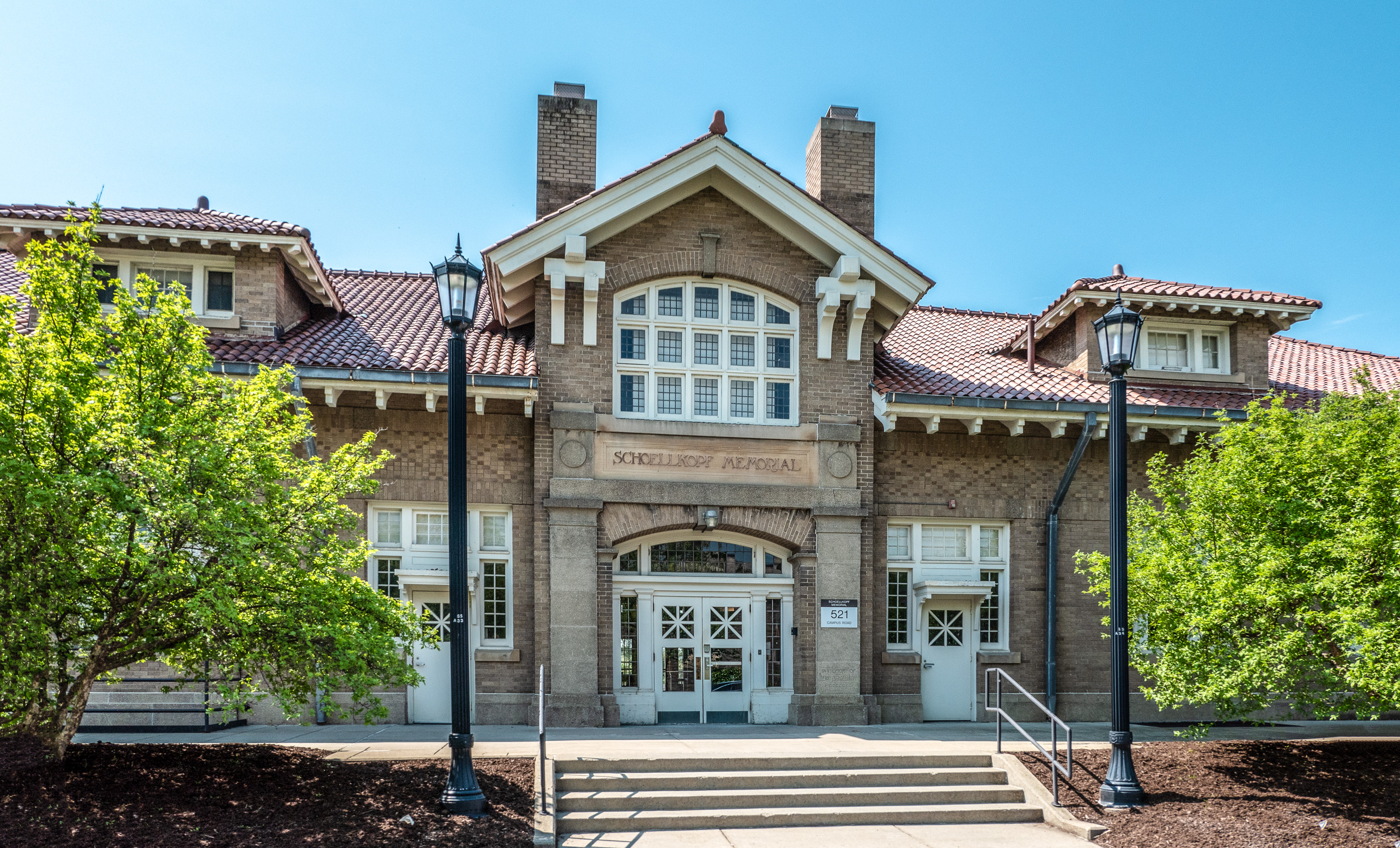
Schoellkopf Memorial Hall at Cornell University

In Milwaukee, he married Mary Elisabeth Murphy in November 1911 and had a daughter named Catherine, born in October 1912.

In December 1912, he committed suicide by shooting himself in the head with a revolver while alone in his office in Milwaukee. He was aged 32 at the time of his death. Following Schoellkopf's death his close friend, Willard Straight, donated $100,000 (equivalent to $3,336,000 in 2025) to construct the Schoellkopf Memorial Hall in his honor. In response to Straight's gift, members of the Schoellkopf family and the Zeta Psi fraternity donated $70,000 (equivalent to $2,335,000 in 2025) for the construction of Schoellkopf Field in honor of the Schoellkopf family patriarch, Jacob F. Schoellkopf.

== Head coaching record ==
Year	Team	Overall	Conference	Standing	Bowl/playoffs
Cornell Big Red (Independent) (1907–1908)
1907	Cornell	8–2			
1908	Cornell	7–1–1			
Cornell:		15–3–1			
Total:		15–3–1			

== See also ==
- 1903 College Football All-America Team
