= Schoellkopf Power Station =

- Schoellkopf Power Station No. 3 Site
- U.S. National Register of Historic Places
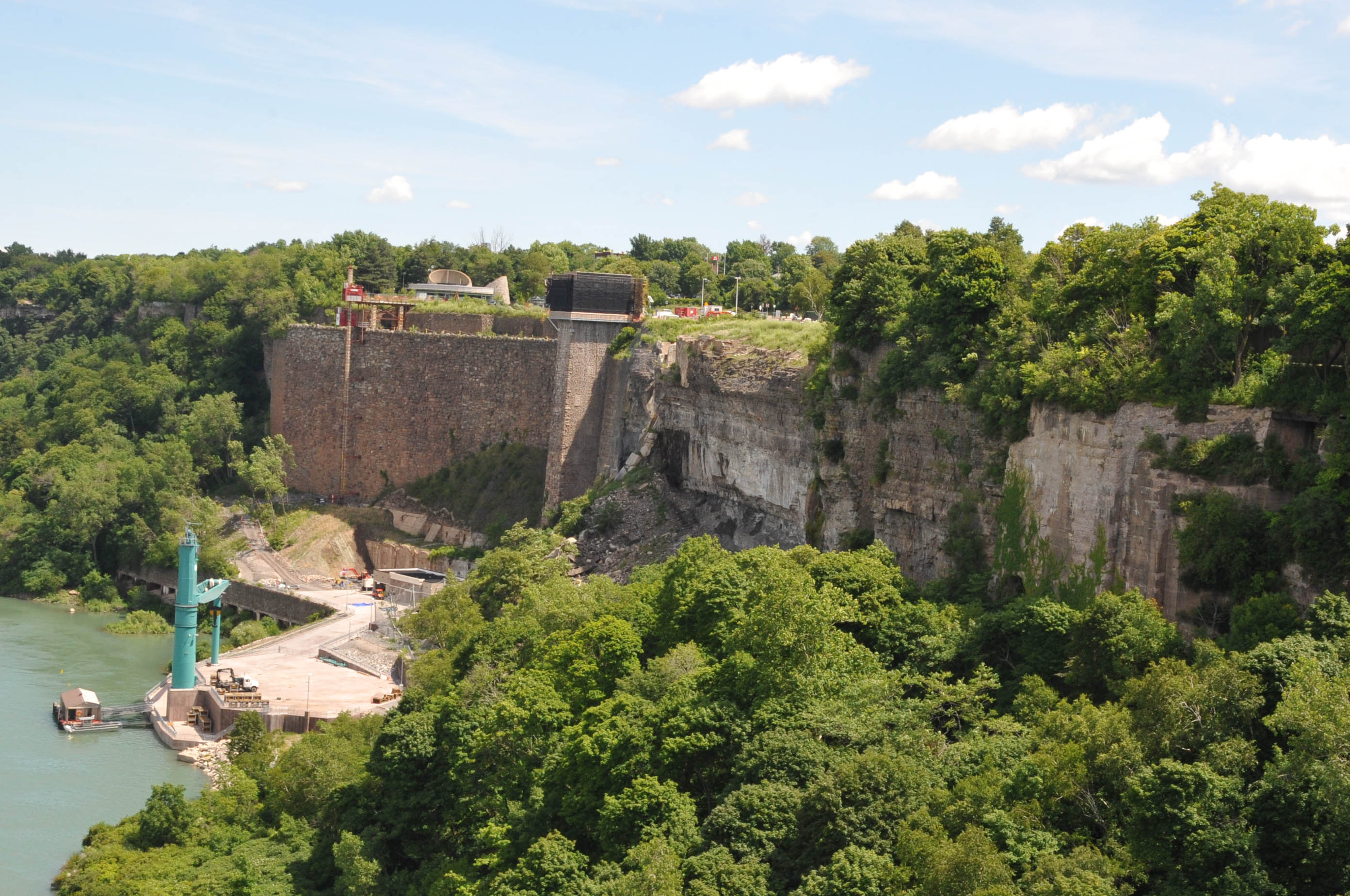
- Schoellkopf Power Station No. 3 Site

- Location within New York
- Location: East Bank of Niagara River, 1,600 feet downriver from Rainbow Bridge, Niagara Falls, New York
- Coordinates: 43°5′35.44″N 79°3′46.29″W
- NRHP reference No.: 13000029
- Added to NRHP: February 20, 2013

The Schoellkopf Power Station was a series of power generation facilities built on the American shore of the Niagara River below Niagara Falls between 1853 and 1924, and in operation in its final phase until 1956. The first used water falling from the upper river height before the falls to the lower after them to drive water turbines to power belts and driveshafts in nearby mills; it was in operation until 1904. The second station was built in 1898 and superseded the first, producing hydroelectricity and operating until 1921. The third station, also hydroelectric, was built in three phases, with the first completed in 1914 and the last in 1924, which operated until a catastrophic failure in 1956.

Only ruins are left in the 2020s, which form a part of a fully accessible tourist attraction associated with Niagara Falls State Park and connected with its Niagara Gorge hiking trail system.

== History ==
The various Schoellkopf Power Stations were built on land owned by Jacob F. Schoellkopf above the Niagara Gorge near the American Falls, 1,600 feet (490 m) downriver from Rainbow Bridge. Understanding the growing need for electricity and the role of harnessing the Falls, Schoellkopf purchased the land for the hydraulic canal on May 1, 1877 for $71,000. After his death in 1903, his sons took over the operation of the power business. In 1918, Schoellkopf's Niagara Falls Hydraulic Power and Manufacturing Company merged with the Niagara Falls Power Company, which was owned by Edward Dean Adams.

=== Station No. 1 ===
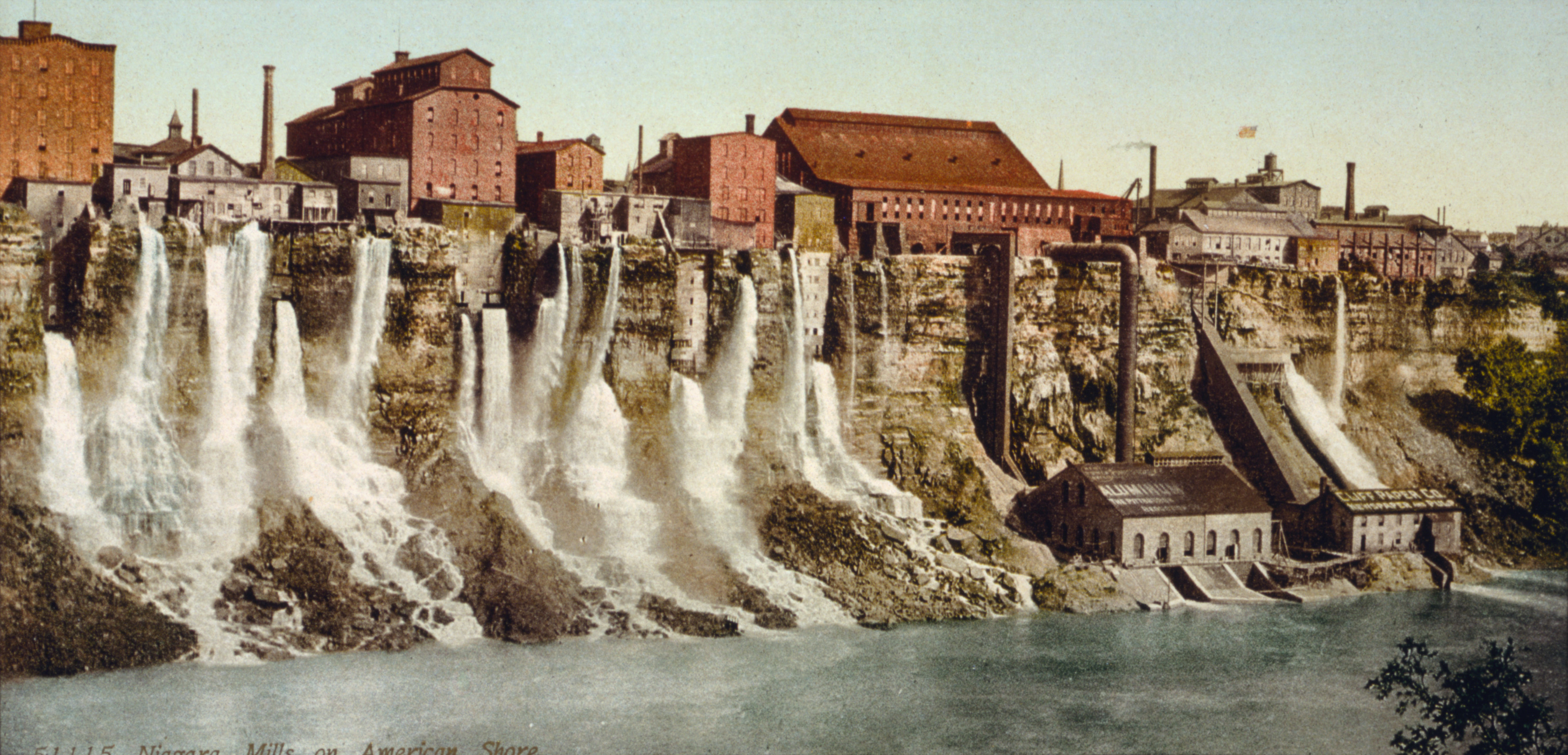
Schoellkopf mills in 1900. The incomplete station 2 was on the right next to station 1

In 1853 construction of a "Hydraulic Canal" was begun, intended to bring water from the Niagara River above the falls to the river level below the falls. The original 1874 plant did not produce electricity but used water turbines to power belts and drive shafts for nearby mills. In 1882 Schoellkopf partnered with Charles Brush, who had come to Niagara Falls with a dynamo and 16 carbon arc lights, which were used on the streets of Niagara Falls, New York. The first dynamo had a capacity of 1,800 horsepower and ran up to 1904 when it was abandoned in favor of Station No. 2. it was also known as the Quigley Pulp - Lower Mill and the Cliff Paper - Lower Mill.

=== Station No. 2 ===
In 1898 a second much larger hydroelectric plant was built at the base of the bluff, immediately in front of Schoellkopf's original 1874 plant, and reached a capacity of 34,000 hp before being shut down in 1921.

=== Station No. 3 ===
Station No. 3a was completed by 1914 and housed 13 10,000-hp turbines. Station No. 3b began construction in 1918 and contained three generators totaling 112,500 hp. Station No. 3c was completed by 1924 with a capacity of 210,000 hp. As the old hydraulic canal was already operating at capacity a new tunnel was constructed to supply the new station.

=== Collapse ===
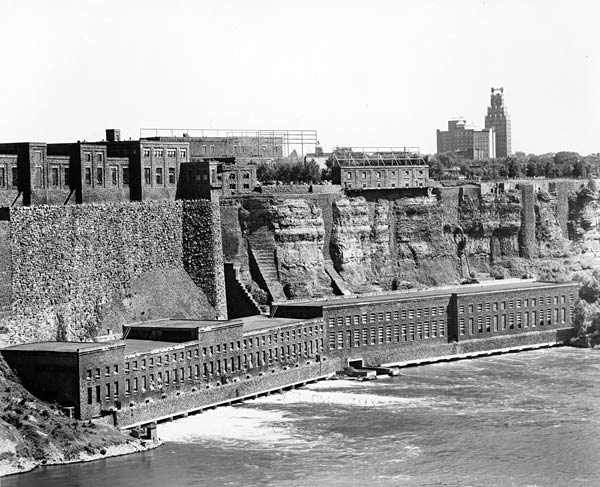
Schoellkopf stations 3a, 3b and 3c. Station 2 is out of frame on the right. (After 1924, before 1956.)

On June 7, 1956, water began seeping into the back of the plant from the wall built against the bluff, causing the wall to crack. At 5 p.m. that day, Station No. 3c and then Station No. 3b flooded and collapsed into the Niagara River, destroying two thirds of the plant and the six generators that produced more than 300,000 horsepower. The grid lost 400,000 kilowatts of power and damage was estimated at $100m. One worker, a machinist named Richard Draper, was killed by falling debris. The forty other workers in the plant survived, though five of them were hospitalized. The remains of the plant either toppled into the gorge or were razed soon after. Station 3A was damaged but remained in operation at reduced volume until 1961. The collapse led to the passage of the Niagara Redevelopment Act in 1957.

Station No. 3a was demolished in 1962 as part of Robert Moses's work to beautify the American side of the falls. The production capacity lost by the 1956 collapse was replaced by the Robert Moses Niagara Power Plant, which was commissioned in 1961. The only permanently extant part of the Schoellkopf site is the stone wall (known as Power Station No. 3), which was built during beautification efforts in 1908–10. That wall was listed on the National Register of Historic Places in February 2013. Depending on the seasonal flow of the river, it is sometimes possible to see the twisted steel girders and even a generator turbine that fell into the river.

== Today ==
Much of the site is, as of 2014, occupied by the Maid of the Mist tour boat company as a maintenance area and off-season boat storage yard. The power station remains form a part of a fully accessible tourist attraction associated with Niagara Falls State Park and is connected with its Niagara Gorge hiking trail system.

== See also ==
- List of hydroelectric power station failures
