= Nathaniel Gist =

Continental Army officer (1733–1812)

- Born: 15 October 1733; Baltimore, Province of Maryland
- Died: 1812 (aged 78–79); Canewood plantation Clark Co Kentucky
- Military career
- Allegiance: United States
- Branch: Infantry
- Service years: 1755–1760; 1777–1783
- Rank: Colonel
- Conflicts: Braddock's Expedition (1755); Forbes Expedition (1758); Cherokee War (1760); Battle of Paulus Hook (1779); Siege of Charleston (1780)

Nathaniel Gist (15 October 1733 – 1812) was born in Maryland and fought during the French and Indian War and the American Revolutionary War. He was reputed by Wurteh Watts to be the father of Sequoyah, the famous Cherokee. Like his father Christopher Gist (1706–1759), he served in Braddock's Expedition in 1755 and the Forbes Expedition in 1758. The outbreak of the American Revolution found him on the frontier. At first suspected of sympathizing with the British, he convinced the Americans of his loyalty.

George Washington, a close friend of his father, authorized him to form Gist's Additional Continental Regiment in January 1777. Gist probably participated in Light Horse Harry Lee's Paulus Hook Raid in 1779. He and his regiment were captured at the Siege of Charleston in May 1780. After the war, he took an American wife Judith Cary Bell (1750–1833) and the couple had four daughters, one of whom married Francis P. Blair. He is variously said to have died in 1796, 1812, or at the end of the War of 1812. He is confused with his uncle Nathaniel Gist (1707–1780). He was a first cousin of Mordecai Gist.

== French and Indian War ==
Born on 15 October 1733 in Baltimore, Province of Maryland, Gist's parents were Christopher Gist (1706–1759) and Sarah Howard (b. 1711). The surname was sometimes rendered Guest. In 1753 his father made a remarkable trek through the wilderness with George Washington. By this time the 20-year-old Nathaniel Gist was a trader living with the Overhill Cherokee near Echota. He and a partner Richard Pearis sold his father's goods to the Native Americans. Both men coveted the land at Long Island in the Holston River (now Kingsport, Tennessee) and soon fell out. Governor Robert Dinwiddie blamed the quarrel for the failure of the Cherokees to aid the British against the French. In 1755 Gist accompanied Braddock's Expedition in 1755, serving as a lieutenant in his father's ranger company in Washington's colonial regiment. He continued his military service in 1756, protecting the frontier against raids by pro-French Indians.

In 1757, Gist received promotion to captain and was given responsibility for 200 Cherokees living in Virginia. He was credited with leading these native peoples as an auxiliary force during the successful Forbes Expedition of 1758. In 1760, Gist accompanied Daniel Boone and other hunters on a trek to Abingdon, Virginia, then called Wolf Hill. The two then split up, with Boone going on to Long Island and Gist traveling to Cumberland Gap. He was said to have sired Sequoyah in 1760 or 1761, but this is unlikely because the Anglo-Cherokee War was raging and Gist was serving in Adam Stephen's colonial Virginia regiment against the Cherokees. This unit advanced as far as Long Island before peace was made between the two sides.

== American Revolutionary War ==
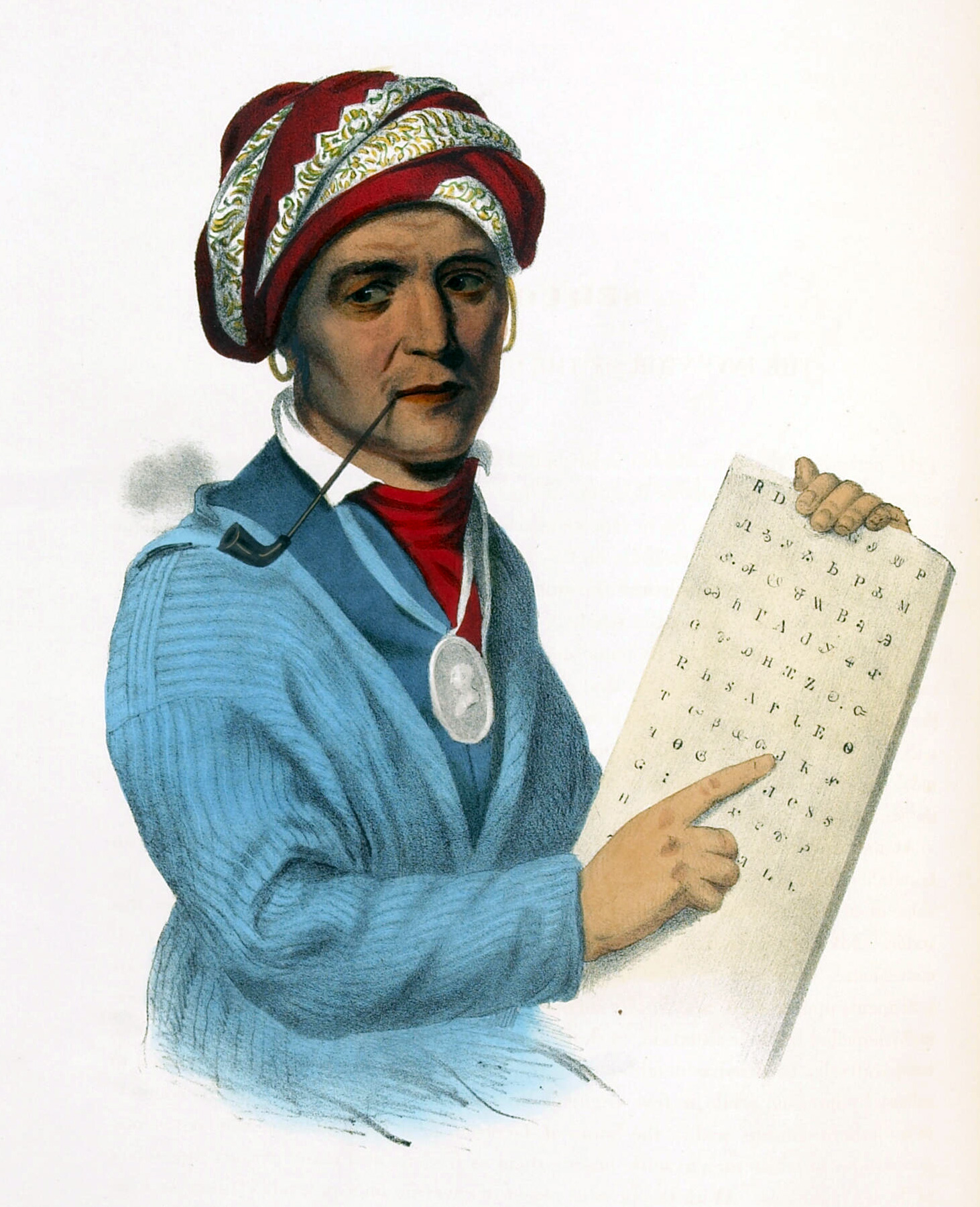
Sequoyah was believed to be Nathaniel Gist's son by Wurteh Watts.

Samuel C. Williams believed that Gist fathered Sequoyah around 1775 by his mother Wurteh Watts. Of a prominent clan, she was related to Old Tassel. Williams dismissed the story that Sequoyah's father was an itinerant German peddler by the name of Guess. He noted that Sequoyah went by George Guess, Guest, and Gist, and that he finished the Cherokee alphabet in 1821 when he was about 40. This was much too young for a man born in 1761. Williams noted that a letter showed that in 1828, Sequoyah visited Gist relatives in Kentucky and was acknowledged as a family member.

The year 1775 found Gist living with the Overhill Cherokees. After a trip to West Florida, he returned to Cherokee country with Henry Stuart, the brother of John Stuart, the British agent to the southern tribes. At this time, the Stuarts and another agent Alexander Cameron were trying to get the white settlers on the Nolichucky and Watauga Rivers to move to West Florida. When the American Revolution broke out, the British agents desired to separate the American loyalist settlers from the rebels, so that the Indians could attack the rebels. They apparently hoped to enlist Gist in the effort. Jarret Williams, a settler got back to Virginia with the news that Gist was working with the British. In fact, Gist was in the pay of Cameron at the time. For his part, Gist warned the Cherokees not to start a war, but they began attacking the settlements anyway.

In 1779, Gist preferred charges against Harry Lee, shown here.

In 1776, Virginia sent an expedition under William Christian against the Cherokees. He was enjoined to capture the Stuarts, Cameron, and Gist as enemies. When the column reached the French Broad River, Gist came into the Virginian camp under a flag of truce. On 15 October 1776, Christian reported to Governor Patrick Henry that some of the Virginia troops recalled Gist's exploits on the frontier in a good light, while most of the soldiers wanted to lynch him as a British spy. Christian thought Gist was remorseful for becoming involved with the British agents, but did not entirely trust him. Nevertheless, he kept him from harm and Gist later regained his popularity. Gist maintained that it was impossible for him to escape so he appeared to go along with the enemy purpose, a story that was accepted by Governor Henry and the Virginia council in December.

Washington appointed Gist colonel in command of Gist's Additional Continental Regiment on 11 January 1777. The regiment was intended to be a light infantry unit. Four companies of southern frontier rangers would be enrolled. In addition, Gist was to recruit 500 natives from the Cherokee and other tribes to serve as scouts. Aside from the military purpose, it was believed that enlisting the braves would bind the tribes in an alliance with the American cause. Only three companies were formed from Virginians and Marylanders. The regiment did not fight as a whole. Instead, the companies of Captains John Gist and Joseph Smith were attached to the 3rd Maryland Regiment while the company of Captain Samuel Lapsley served with the 12th Virginia Regiment. The three companies that comprised the regiment fought with the main army in the Philadelphia Campaign in the summer and fall of 1777 and at the Battle of Monmouth in June 1778.

On 22 April 1779, Gist's Regiment absorbed Grayson's Additional Continental Regiment and Thruston's Additional Continental Regiment. The consolidated regiment reformed in the strength of eight companies. The unit was assigned to the 1st Virginia Brigade on 12 May. Gist preferred charges against Light Horse Harry Lee after the latter's capture of British prisoners at the Battle of Paulus Hook on 19 August 1779. Brigadier General George Weedon, who evidently disagreed with the charges, called Gist "the head of the Wrongheads". (Note: This suggests that Gist's regiment either formed part of the attacking column or part of Lord Stirling's relief force. But this is not stated by Boatner.) On 4 December, the regiment was ordered to march to Charleston, South Carolina. On 6 April 1780, William Woodford's contingent of 750 Virginia Continentals arrived, having marched 500 miles (805 km). Gist and his regiment were captured on 12 May 1780 at the Siege of Charleston. He retired from the army on 1 January 1783.

Gist received 7,000 acres in Kentucky for his services in the war. He moved there in 1793 and built an estate called Canewood. At that time he was described as six feet tall and "stout-framed", with a dark complexion. Williams believed that he died around the end of the War of 1812. Historian Francis B. Heitman asserted that Gist died in 1796.

== Family ==
Nathaniel had two brothers, Richard Gist, who was born on 2 September 1729 and died at the Battle of King's Mountain in 1780, and Thomas Gist, who moved to Kentucky after the American Revolutionary War. Heitman states that it was Nathaniel Gist Jr., an ensign in his father's regiment, who died at King's Mountain. His father had two brothers. Nathaniel is sometimes confused with his uncle Nathaniel. In 1783, Gist married Judith Cary Bell and the couple had four daughters, Eliza Violet, Sarah Howard, Anne Cary, and Maria. Eliza married Francis Preston Blair and was the mother of Montgomery Blair who served in Abraham Lincoln's cabinet and Francis Preston Blair Jr. a Union general and US Senator. Sarah married Jesse Bledsoe who became a US Senator, Anne wed Dr. Joseph Boswell, and Maria married Benjamin Gratz. The noted Maryland officer Mordecai Gist was his first cousin.

== Notes ==
Footnotes

Citations
