= Peter A. Porter (colonel) =

American politician

Col. Peter A. Porter
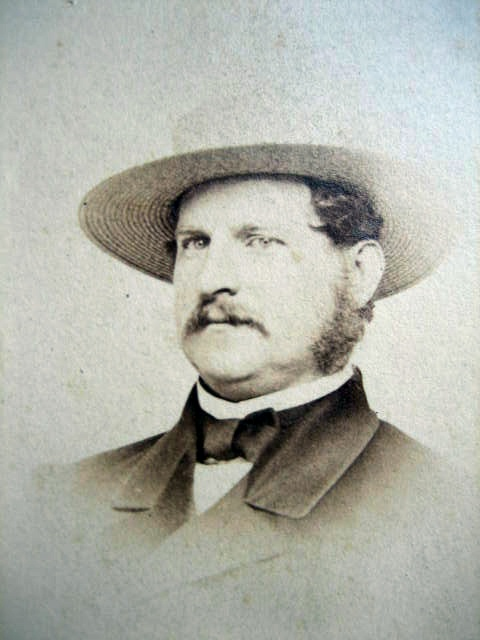

Member of the New York Assembly for Niagara County
- In office January 1, 1862 – December 31, 1862
- Preceded by: Oliver P. Scovell
- Succeeded by: William Morgan

Personal details
- Born: Peter Augustus Porter; July 14, 1827 Black Rock, New York, US
- Died: June 3, 1864 (aged 36) Cold Harbor, Virginia, US
- Resting place: Oakwood Cemetery; Niagara Falls, New York
- Party: War Democrat
- Spouses: Mary Cabell Breckinridge (m. 1852; died 1854) Josephine Matilda Morris (m. 1859)
- Relations: See Breckinridge family
- Children: 3, including Peter
- Parent(s): Peter Buell Porter; Letitia Breckinridge
- Education: Harvard College; Harvard Law School
- Profession: Lawyer, politician, soldier

Military service
- Branch/service: (New York (state)) 8th New York Heavy Artillery Regiment
- Years of service: 1862–1864
- Rank: Colonel
- Battles/wars: U.S. Civil War • Battle of Spotsylvania • Battle of Cold Harbor

Peter Augustus Porter (July 14, 1827 – June 3, 1864) was a lawyer, politician, and member of the Breckinridge family and a Union Army colonel in the American Civil War. He died in the Battle of Cold Harbor.

== Early life ==
Porter was born on July 14, 1827, in Black Rock, New York, the only son of Yale lawyer Peter Buell Porter, a military leader in the War of 1812 and United States Secretary of War from 1828 to 1829, and Letitia Breckinridge. Before his parents marriage, his mother was a widow as her first husband, whom she married in 1804, Alfred William Grayson, had died in 1810. Grayson, a graduate of Cambridge University, was the son of Senator William Grayson of Virginia. Through his mother's first marriage, Porter had a half-brother, John Breckinridge Grayson (1806–1862).

Porter graduated from Harvard, studied at Heidelberg and Berlin, and graduated from Harvard Law School in 1857. He also authored plays, poems, and essays.

=== Family ===
His maternal grandfather was John Breckinridge (1760–1806), a U.S. Senator from Kentucky from 1801 to 1805, and Attorney General of the United States under Jefferson from 1805 to 1806. His maternal grandmother was Mary Hopkins Cabell, of the Cabell political family. His maternal uncles were Cabell Breckinridge (1788–1823), Rev. Dr. John Breckinridge (1797–1841), Robert Jefferson Breckinridge (1800–1871), and Rev. Dr. William Lewis Breckinridge (1803–1876). His first cousin was John C. Breckinridge (1821–1875), the youngest-ever Vice President of the United States, serving from 1857 until 1861, under President James Buchanan.

His paternal grandfather was Col. Joshua Porter (1730–1825), a Yale College graduate, who fought in the Revolutionary War. He was at the head of his regiment in October 1777 when John Burgoyne surrendered his 6,000 men after the Battles of Saratoga. After the war, his grandfather was elected to various official positions for forty-eight consecutive years.

== Career ==
In 1862, Porter was elected as a War Democrat, or Union, member of the New York State Assembly to represent Niagara Co.'s 2nd District, and served in 85th New York State Legislature.

=== Civil War ===
On October 21, 1861, his half-brother, John, then a Confederate brigadier general, died of pneumonia and tuberculosis, only three months after joining the Confederate Army.

On July 7, 1862, he offered his services to Gov. Edwin D. Morgan and was appointed Colonel, in the Union Army, of the 129th New York State Volunteers. The regiment was reformed into the 8th New York Heavy Artillery Regiment on December 19, 1862. His regiment, under Brig. Gen. Robert O. Tyler, was of a unit that manned the forts around Washington, D.C., and participated in parades used to increase morale in the city in the time of war. However, they were also trained to be used as infantry if necessary. His reason for enlisting was reported in his eulogy printed in The New York Times, where Porter was purported to have said:

In order to secure success, the gentlemen, the educated and influential men of the North must join the service, and discipline, educate and lead its armies; that it would not be wise to entrust their unprincipled lawyer, or that ignorant mechanic with a military command, subordinate or otherwise, merely because he possessed a degree of neighborhood notoriety and popularity; on the contrary that it would be cruel toward our soldiers and fatal to our cause to act thus.

On September 5, 1863, Porter was nominated for New York Secretary of State but declined, saying that his neighbors had entrusted him with the lives of their sons and he could not leave them while the war lasted. In May 1864, Porter's unit, like many Heavy Artillery regiments, was ordered by Grant (a distant cousin, though both likely did not know that) to join the Army of the Potomac then fighting in the overland campaign.

In May 1864, during a lull in the Battle of Spotsylvania, a rebel soldier fired several shots at Porter while disguised by a tree. His men saw faint white smoke from the tree and six men shot at the tree, shooting the soldier. The soldier turned out to be a Confederate Captain who had been a prisoner at Fort McHenry while Porter commanded it and few days earlier had been paroled, but not exchanged. The soldier was badly wounded but stated that he had fired three times at Porter and hoped "to bring him down the next time," adding that "if I had killed him [Porter] I should die satisfied." Porter reportedly restrained his men from attacking the culprit with their bayonets.

==== Battle of Cold Harbor ====
On June 3, 1864, during the Battle of Cold Harbor in Virginia, Brig. Gen. Tyler, who Porter's regiment reported to, was wounded. Tyler requested Porter take command of the brigade. Porter then led the charge, advancing a short distance until he was shot through the neck. As reported in his eulogy, Porter "immediately rose and advanced again, but had moved only a few paces forward when he fell to rise no more". The following night, five of his men, Sgt. Le Roy Williams, Galen S. Hicks, John Duff, Walter Harwood, Samuel Travis and John Heany, brought Porter's body, with six bullets still in him, through a rain storm back to the Union side. For his participation in recovering Col. Porter's body, Sgt. Williams was later awarded the Medal of Honor. Porter was first taken to Baltimore, Maryland, met by a military escort and then taken to the St. Peter's Episcopal Church, and there placed in the chancel draped in the flag of his country. Chaplain Gilbert De La Matyr accompanied Porter's body back to Niagara Falls.

== Personal life ==
In 1852, Porter married his first cousin, Mary Cabell Breckinridge (1826–1854), daughter of Rev. John Breckinridge (1797–1841), his mother's brother. His father-in-law was a Presbyterian Minister who graduated from Princeton College in 1818 and Princeton Theological Seminary in 1821 and served as Chaplain of the U.S. House of Representatives. Mary's maternal great-grandfather was Samuel Stanhope Smith, president of Princeton University from 1795 to 1812. Before Mary's death in 1854 in the cholera epidemic, they had one son:

- Peter Augustus Porter (1853–1925), a member of the United States House of Representatives

On November 9, 1859, Porter married Josephine Matilda Morris (1831–1892), a daughter of George Washington Morris (1799–1834), cousin of Charles Manigault Morris (1820–1895), and granddaughter of Lewis Morris (1754–1824) and great-granddaughter of Lewis Morris (1726–1798) of Morrisania. Josephine was born at Grove Plantation in South Carolina, but her father was born at the family seat, Morrisania, in Westchester County, New York. When her father died in 1834, Josephine was only three years old and her mother Maria Whaley Morris took over management of the plantation until Josephine's brother, George Washington Morris, Jr., took it over. George Jr. ran up huge debts and after his death in 1857, the house and 124 of the 136 slaves the family owned were auctioned in Charleston in January 1858. In November of the following year, Peter and Josephine were married, and moved a brand new house in Niagara Falls along with Porter's sister, Elizabeth Porter. Together, they were the parents of two children:

- Letitia Porter (1861–1864), who died five months after Porter of diphtheria.
- George Morris Porter (1863–1907), an 1885 graduate of the University of Michigan.

Porter's funeral was held at St. Peter's Episcopal Church, where he used to attend services when he lived in that city, led by Reverend Dr. Shelton, an Episcopal minister and the same that had given the same last rites to his father, his mother, and his wife. Following the funeral services at the church, his remains were carried to his final resting place in Oakwood Cemetery.

== See also ==
- Breckinridge family

New York State Assembly
Preceded by Oliver P. Scovell	New York State Assembly; Niagara County, 2nd District; 1862	Succeeded by William Morgan
