= Gist's Additional Continental Regiment =

- Active: 1777–1781
- Allegiance: (United States) Continental Congress
- Type: Infantry
- Role: Light infantry
- Size: 3 to 8 companies
- Part of: Continental Army
- Engagements: Battle of Brandywine (1777); Battle of Germantown (1777); Battle of Monmouth (1778); Battle of Paulus Hook (1779); Siege of Charleston (1780)

Commanders
- Notable commanders: Colonel Nathaniel Gist

Gist's Additional Continental Regiment was an American infantry unit that served for four years in the Continental Army during the American Revolutionary War. Authorized in January 1777, the unit was intended to be made up of four companies of light infantry and 500 Indian scouts. In practice, only three companies were recruited from the colonies of Virginia and Maryland. George Washington appointed noted frontiersman Nathaniel Gist as colonel in command. Two companies commanded by Captains John Gist and Joseph Smithand were attached to the 3rd Maryland Regiment while one company commanded by Captain Samuel Lapsley was attached to the 12th Virginia Regiment during the Philadelphia Campaign in summer and fall 1777, and at Monmouth in June 1778.

In April 1779 the regiment absorbed Grayson's Additional Continental Regiment and Thruston's Additional Continental Regiment. The consolidated regiment was reorganized as eight companies and a month later was assigned to the 1st Virginia Brigade. The regiment was probably involved in Light Horse Harry Lee's Paulus Hook Raid in August 1779. In December 1779, the unit was transferred from the main army to the Southern Department. In May 1780, Gist and his regiment were captured at the Siege of Charleston. The unit was officially disbanded on 1 January 1781.

== History ==
The 13 January 1777 letter from George Washington to Gist with orders to form the regiment is preserved. Since it gives an idea of the conditions under which the Additional regiments were raised, it is worth reproducing in full.

Sir: You are hereby authorized and Impowered to raise four Companies of Rangers upon the Continental pay, Rank, and establishment. To enable you to do this, you are furnished with a Warrant for 3,000 Dollars to recruit with; part of the bounty to be given at the time of Inlisting, and the other part when the men join the Battalion or Corps they belong to.

That you may not be restricted in the choice of Officers fit for this kind of Service, I leave the Nomination of them (that is for the four Companies) to yourself, reserving to myself a Negative upon any improper choice as in other Cases.

You are to delay no time in forwarding these Companies to the Army (under my immediate Command) as fast as possible where they will be received and provided with necessaries, you are to keep me duly advised of your proceedings that I may know in what time to expect your assistance, When you consider the advanced Season, and compare it with the time we shall undoubtedly be called into the Field I am perswaded it will be a powerful argument in favour of your every exertion to raise the Men. Wishing you success in it, I am, etc.

== Service record ==
Designation	Date	Brigade	Department
Gist's Additional Regiment	11 January 1777	none	Main Army
Gist's Additional Regiment	22 April 1779	none	consolidated
Gist's Additional Regiment	12 May 1779	1st Virginia	Main Army
Gist's Additional Regiment	4 December 1779	none	Southern
Gist's Additional Regiment	12 May 1780	none	captured
Gist's Additional Regiment	1 January 1781	none	disbanded

== Bibliography ==
- Boatner, Mark M. III (1994). Encyclopedia of the American Revolution. Mechanicsburg, Pa.: Stackpole Books. ISBN 0-8117-0578-1.
- Heitman, Francis Bernard (1914). Historical Register of Officers of the Continental Army during the War of the Revolution. Washington, D.C.: Rare Book Shop Publishing Company.
- McGuire, Thomas J. (2006). The Philadelphia Campaign, Volume I. Mechanicsburg, Penn.: Stackpole Books. ISBN 0-8117-0178-6.
- McGuire, Thomas J. (2007). The Philadelphia Campaign, Volume II. Mechanicsburg, Penn.: Stackpole Books. ISBN 0-8117-0206-5.
- Morrissey, Brendan (2008). Monmouth Courthouse 1778: The last great battle in the North. Long Island City, N.Y.: Osprey Publishing. ISBN 978-1-84176-772-7.
- Washington, George. "The writings of George Washington from the original manuscript sources. Vol. 7. University of Virginia".
- Wright, Robert K. Jr. (1989). The Continental Army. Washington, D.C.: United States Army Center of Military History. CMH Pub 60-4.
