= Annie Edson Taylor =

American schoolteacher and daredevil (1838–1921)

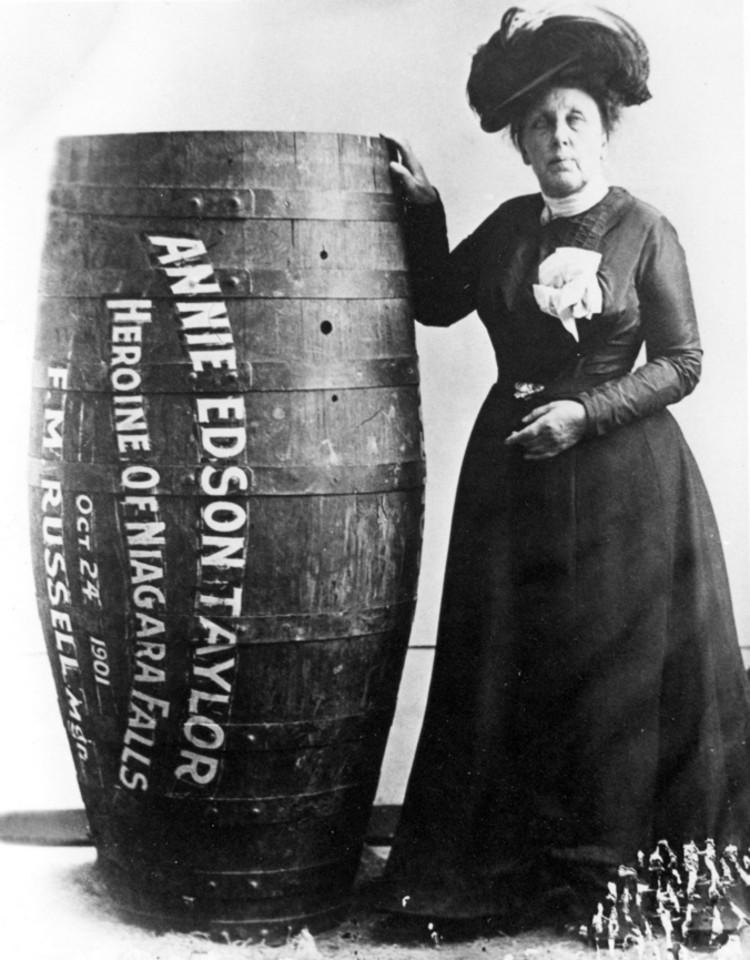
- Taylor posing next to her barrel
- Born: Annie M Edson; 24 October 1838; Auburn, New York, U.S.
- Died: April 29, 1921 (aged 82); Lockport, New York, U.S.
- Other names: Queen of the Mist, Queen of the Falls
- Occupations: Schoolteacher; daredevil
- Known for: First person to go over Niagara Falls intentionally and survive

Annie Edson Taylor (October 24, 1838 – April 29, 1921) was an American schoolteacher who, on her 63rd birthday, October 24, 1901, became the first person to survive a trip over Niagara Falls in a barrel.

== Early life ==
Annie was born on October 24, 1838, in Auburn, New York. She was one of eight children born to Merrick Edson (1804–1850) and Lucretia Waring; her father owned a flour mill and died when she was 12 years old, leaving enough money to provide a comfortable living for the family. She became a schoolteacher (she received an honors degree in a four-year training course). During her studies, she met David Taylor. They were married and had a son who died in infancy. Her husband died soon after. After she was widowed, she spent her working years in between jobs and locales.

Eventually, she ended up in Bay City, Michigan, where she hoped to be a dance instructor. Since there were no dance schools in Bay City at that time, Taylor opened her own. She moved to Sault Ste. Marie in 1900 to teach music. From there, she traveled to San Antonio, Texas. She and a friend then went to Mexico City to find work. Unsuccessful, she returned to Bay City.

== Niagara Falls ==
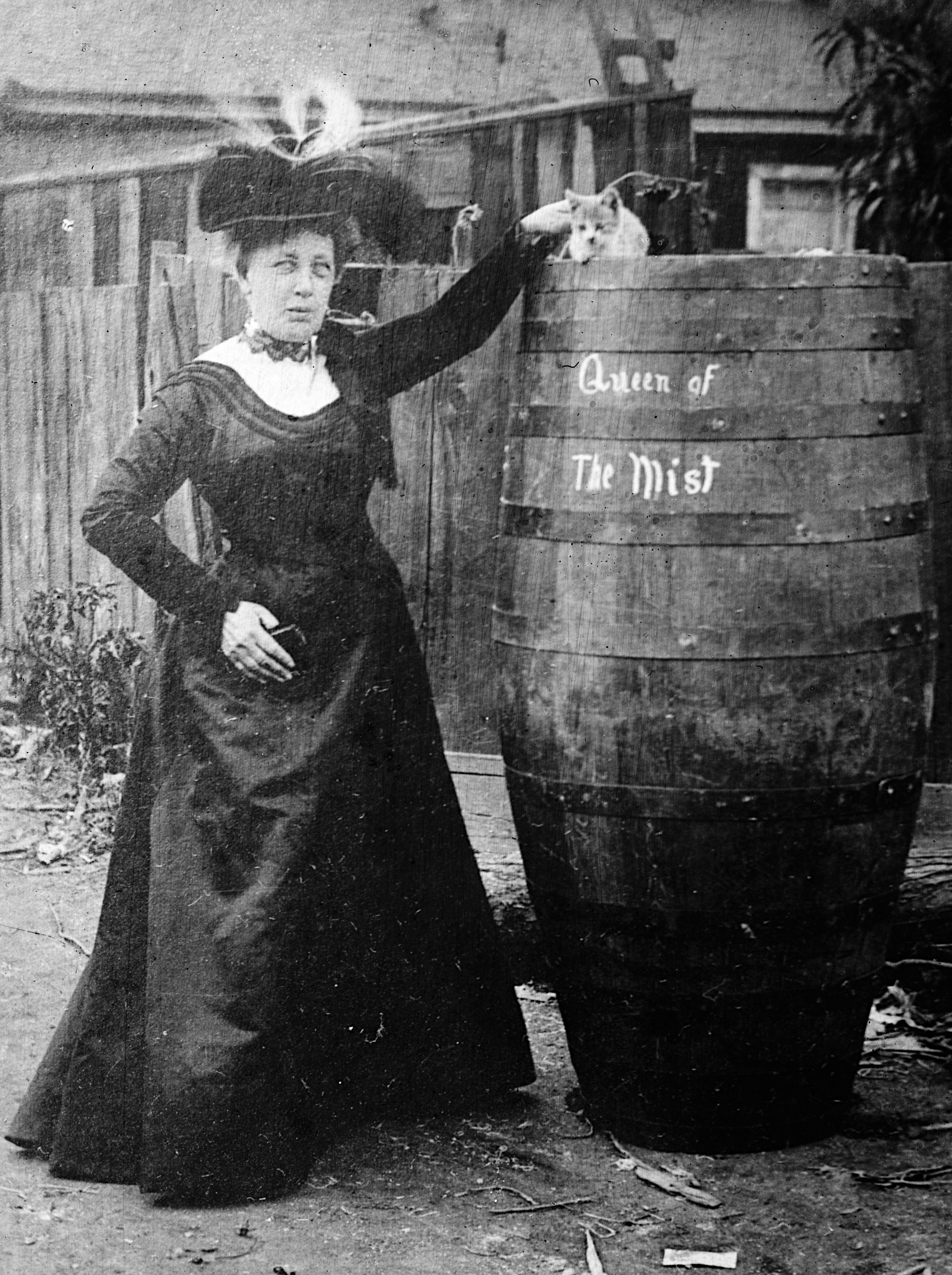
"The Queen of the Mist" posing with her barrel and cat

By 1900, Taylor had fallen upon hard times, having been burned out of her home and having lost money invested with a clergyman. She claimed to be only 42 years old at the time, suggesting that she could make money more easily if she were younger. Having always associated with "the best class of people, the cultured and the refined," Taylor believed that she needed money to hold her place in the world. In the 1900 Federal Census, she declared her year of birth as 1860. Hoping to secure her later years financially, she decided she would be the first person to ride over Niagara Falls in a barrel. Taylor used a custom-made barrel for her trip, constructed of oak and iron and padded with a mattress. Several delays occurred in the launching of the barrel, particularly because no one wanted to be involved in the stunt. Two days before Taylor's own attempt, a domestic cat was sent over the Horseshoe Falls in her barrel to test its strength to see if the barrel would break or not. Contrary to rumors at the time, the cat survived the plunge and seventeen minutes later, after she was found with a bleeding head, posed with Taylor in photographs.

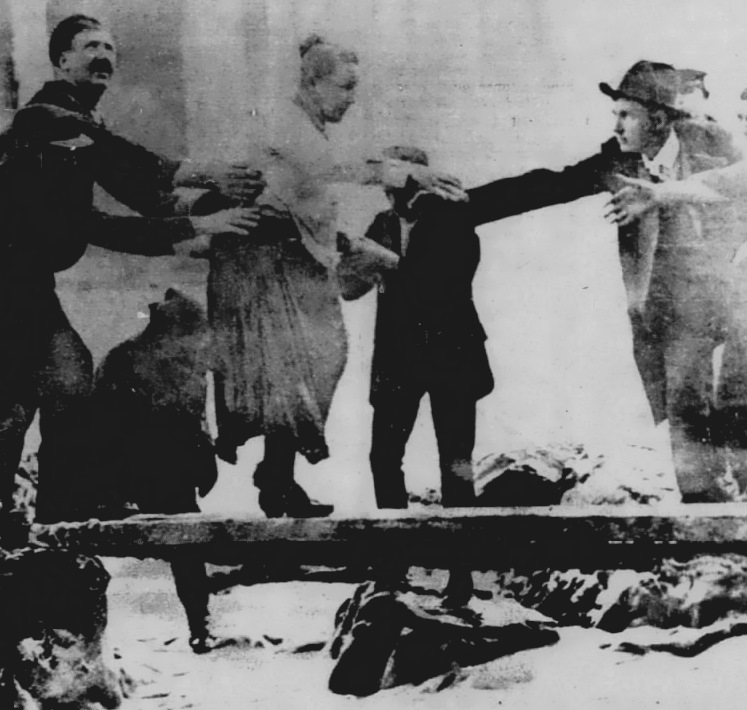
Annie Taylor helped to shore after going over the falls.

On October 24, 1901, her 63rd birthday, the barrel was put over the side of a rowboat, and Taylor climbed in, along with her lucky heart-shaped pillow. After screwing down the lid, friends used a bicycle tire pump to compress the air in the barrel. The hole used for this was plugged with a cork, and Taylor was set adrift near the American shore, south of Goat Island.

The river currents carried the barrel over the Canadian Horseshoe Falls, which has since been the site for all successful daredevil stunting at Niagara Falls. Rescuers reached her barrel shortly after the plunge. Taylor was discovered to be alive and relatively uninjured, except for a small gash on her head. The trip itself took less than twenty minutes, but it was some time before the barrel was actually opened. Taylor was helped out of the barrel by Carlisle Graham, her friend and the first man to run the rapids on a raft. After the journey, Taylor told the press:

If it was with my dying breath, I would caution anyone against attempting the feat ... I would sooner walk up to the mouth of a cannon, knowing it was going to blow me to pieces than make another trip over the Fall.

== Later years ==
She briefly earned money speaking about her experience but was never able to build much wealth. She wrote a memoir and returned to Niagara Falls to sell it. Her manager, Frank M. Russell, ran away with her barrel, and most of her savings were used towards private detectives hired to find it. It was eventually located in Chicago, only to be stolen again by a new manager, William A. Banks.

She spent her final years posing for photographs with tourists at her souvenir stand, attempting to earn money from the New York Stock Exchange, briefly talking about taking a second plunge over the cataracts in 1906, attempting to write a novel, re-constructing her 1901 plunge on film (which was never seen), working as a clairvoyant, and providing magnetic therapeutic treatments to local residents.

== Death ==
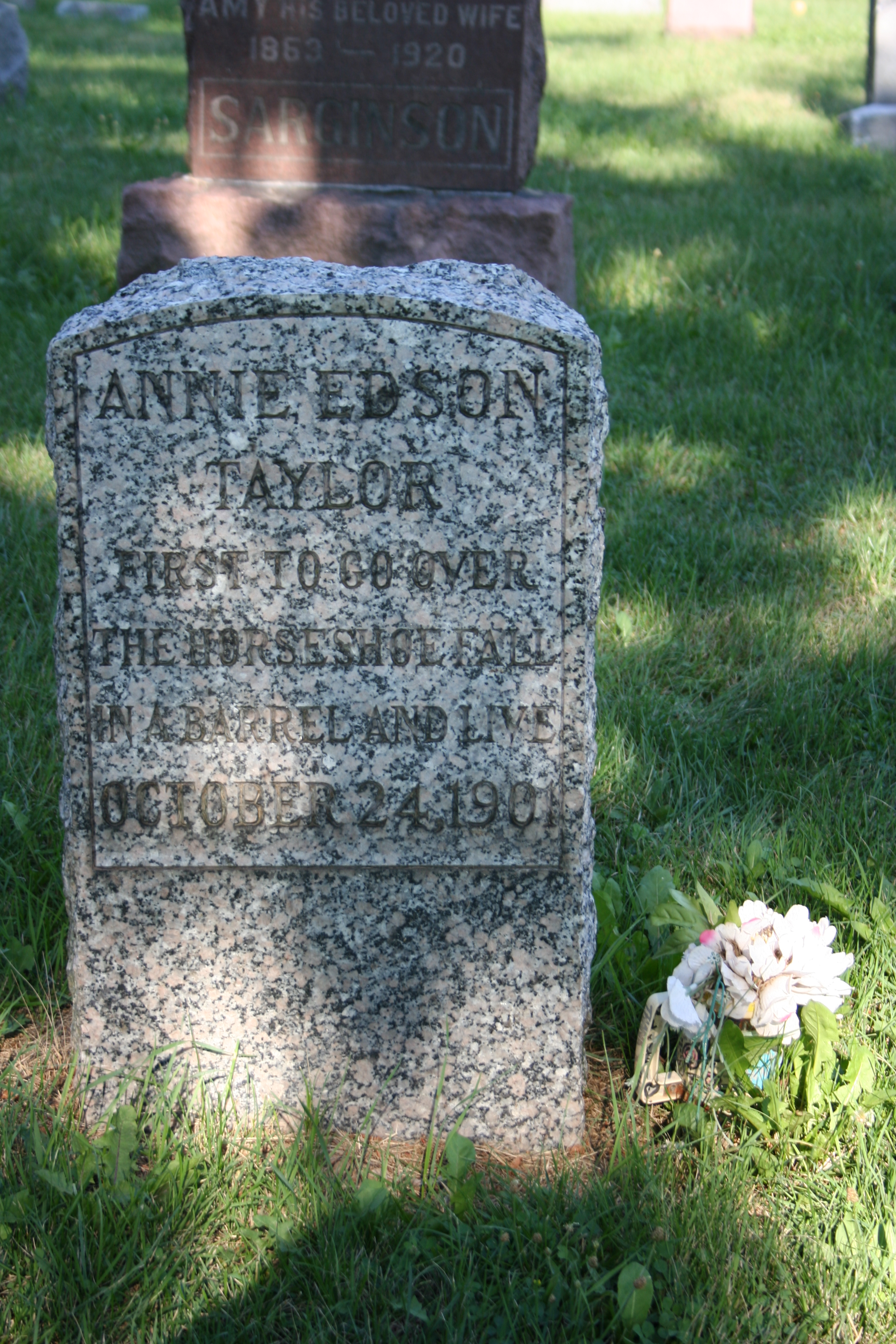
Taylor's grave

Taylor entered the Niagara County Infirmary in Lockport, New York on February 23, 1921, claiming her age to be 57. She died on April 29, 1921, aged 82 and was interred next to her friend and fellow daredevil Carlisle Graham, in the "Stunter's Rest" section of Oakwood Cemetery in Niagara Falls, New York.

Since she died penniless, public donations were sought to pay the costs of her funeral, which was held on May 5, 1921. She attributed her bad health and near blindness to her trip over the falls.

== In popular culture ==
- Annie Taylor's character appears in the IMAX film Niagara: Miracles, Myths and Magic.
- Emma Donoghue has written a short story featuring Taylor's descent.
- Composer Michael John LaChiusa wrote a musical, Queen of the Mist, based on Taylor's life. It was premiered by Transport Group in New York City on October 18, 2011, and starred Mary Testa as Taylor.
- In TV Murdoch Mysteries 7-1 "Murdoch Ahoy", Annie (Jillian Cook) is in Toronto for a speech, at the police station accusing her manager (Joel Rinzler) of stealing her barrel.
- Her story also appears in "Niagara Falls Daredevil, Accidental Nuclear Bomb, Railroad Heroine", an episode of Mysteries at the Museum.
- Lindsey Lauren Visser wrote "Annie Edson Taylor's Barrel v. Niagara Falls" for The Buffalo History Museum Podcast.
- Wisconsin-based Americana singer-songwriter Trapper Schoepp tells Annie Edson Taylor’s story in the song “Queen of the Mist” on his 2023 album, Siren Songs, which was recorded at Johnny Cash’s cabin.
- Author and illustrator Chris Van Allsburg published Queen of the Falls about Taylor's life, centered on her descent over the falls.
