= William Sutherland (British Army officer) =

British Army officer

- Military career
- Allegiance: United Kingdom
- Branch: British Army
- Rank: Major
- Conflicts: American Revolutionary War: Battles of Lexington and Concord; Battle of Paulus Hook

William Sutherland was a British officer during the American Revolution.

Lieutenant Sutherland, of the 38th Regiment of Foot, marched with the British troops, under the command of General Gage, from Boston, Massachusetts on the night of 18 April 1775 led by Lieutenant-Colonel Francis Smith. The next morning, 19 April, Sutherland and another officer, Lieutenant Adair of the Marines, at the lead of the column about a mile from Lexington, were confronted by an armed colonist who aimed his musket at them, pulled the trigger, but the gun misfired (actually it flashed in the pan, i.e. the primer powder failed to ignite the charge in the musket). Convinced that the colonist meant to kill them, they returned to the column and informed Major John Pitcairn of the British Marines of the incident. Pitcairn and the British column marched on to Lexington where they met and fired on local minutemen on the village green.

After this initial engagement, the British troops marched on to Concord. Sutherland was with the British soldiers at the North Bridge in Concord when they confronted around 400 Massachusetts militia and minutemen. He attempted to rally the troops and hold the bridge when the colonial militia returned fire, "the shot heard round the world," thus igniting the American Revolution. Sutherland was wounded in the shoulder during the engagement and returned to Boston during the British retreat. Shortly afterwards, Sutherland was promoted to captain. Sutherland would later write about the British action at Lexington and Concord.

Over four years later, now a major, Sutherland was in command of a British fort at Paulus Hook along the North River (now called the Hudson River) in present-day Jersey City, New Jersey. On 19 August 1779, the fort was attacked by 400 Continental soldiers led by Light Horse Harry Lee in what became known as the Battle of Paulus Hook. The fort, along with around 150 Hessian soldiers were captured. Sutherland managed to escape into a small redoubt within the fort with a small force of a few officers and forty Hessians. Lee was not able to capture the men in the redoubt and left the next morning.
