= Le Roy Williams =

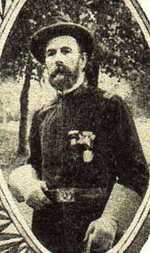
- Born: August 18, 1845; Oswego, New York, US
- Died: February 14, 1930 (aged 84); Cleveland, Ohio, US
- Burial place: Oakwood Cemetery
- Military career
- Allegiance: United States
- Branch: United States Army; Union Army
- Service years: 1862–1865
- Rank: First Lieutenant
- Units: Company G, 8th New York Heavy Artillery
- Conflicts: Battle of Cold Harbor
- Awards: Medal of Honor

Le Roy Williams (August 18, 1845 – February 14, 1930) was an American soldier who received the Medal of Honor for valor during the American Civil War.

== Biography ==
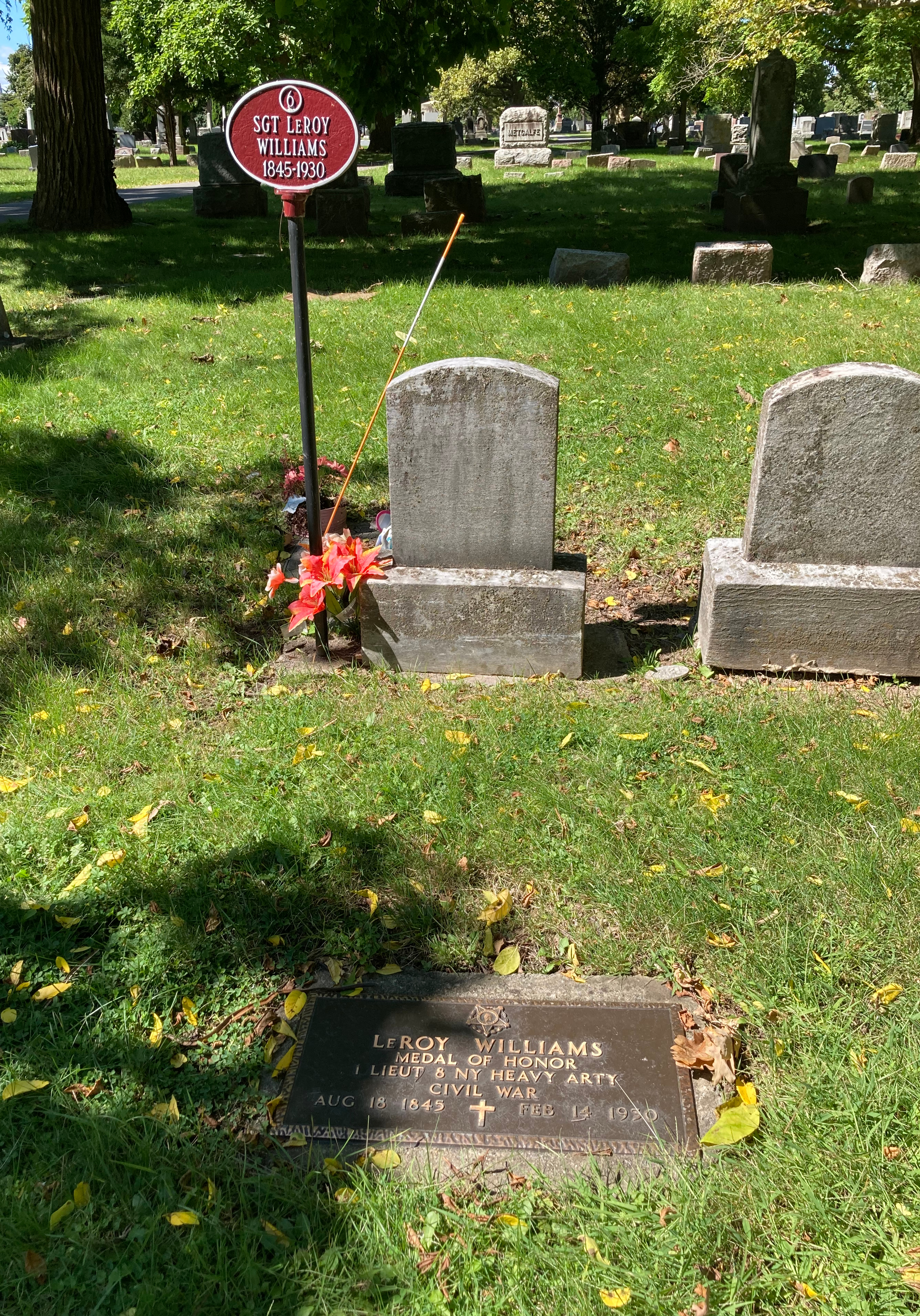
Williams' grave at Oakwood Cemetery

Williams joined the Union Army in July 1862, and served with Company G of the 8th New York Heavy Artillery. He received the Medal of Honor on April 1, 1898, for his actions in recovering the remains of the regiment's commander Peter A. Porter at the Battle of Cold Harbor in Virginia. He was later promoted to first lieutenant, and was transferred to the 10th New York Infantry shortly before the regiment was mustered out in June 1865.

After the war, Williams lived in Niagara, New York where he worked as a customs collector, and later in Buffalo, New York and Lansing, Michigan.

He died in Cleveland on February 14, 1930, and was buried at Oakwood Cemetery in Niagara Falls, New York.

== Medal of Honor citation ==
Citation:

Voluntarily exposed himself to the fire of the enemy's sharpshooters and located the body of his colonel who had been killed close to the enemy's lines. Under cover of darkness, with 4 companions, he recovered the body and brought it within the Union lines, having approached within a few feet of the Confederate pickets while so engaged.

== See also ==
- List of American Civil War Medal of Honor recipients: T–Z
