= Carlisle Graham =

American cooper and swimmer

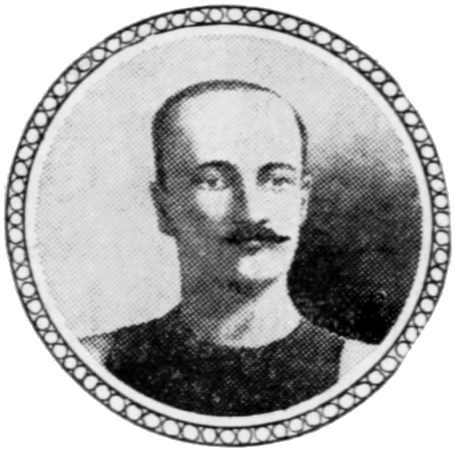
- Portrait of Carlisle Graham

Personal information
- Full name: Carlisle D. Graham
- Born: December , 1850 Wilmington, Delaware, U.S.
- Died: May 3, 1909 (aged 58) U.S.
- Resting place: Oakwood Cemetery, Niagara Falls, New York, U.S.
- Years active: 1886 – 1905
- Spouse: Barbara Graham (nee Haft)

Sport
- Country: United States

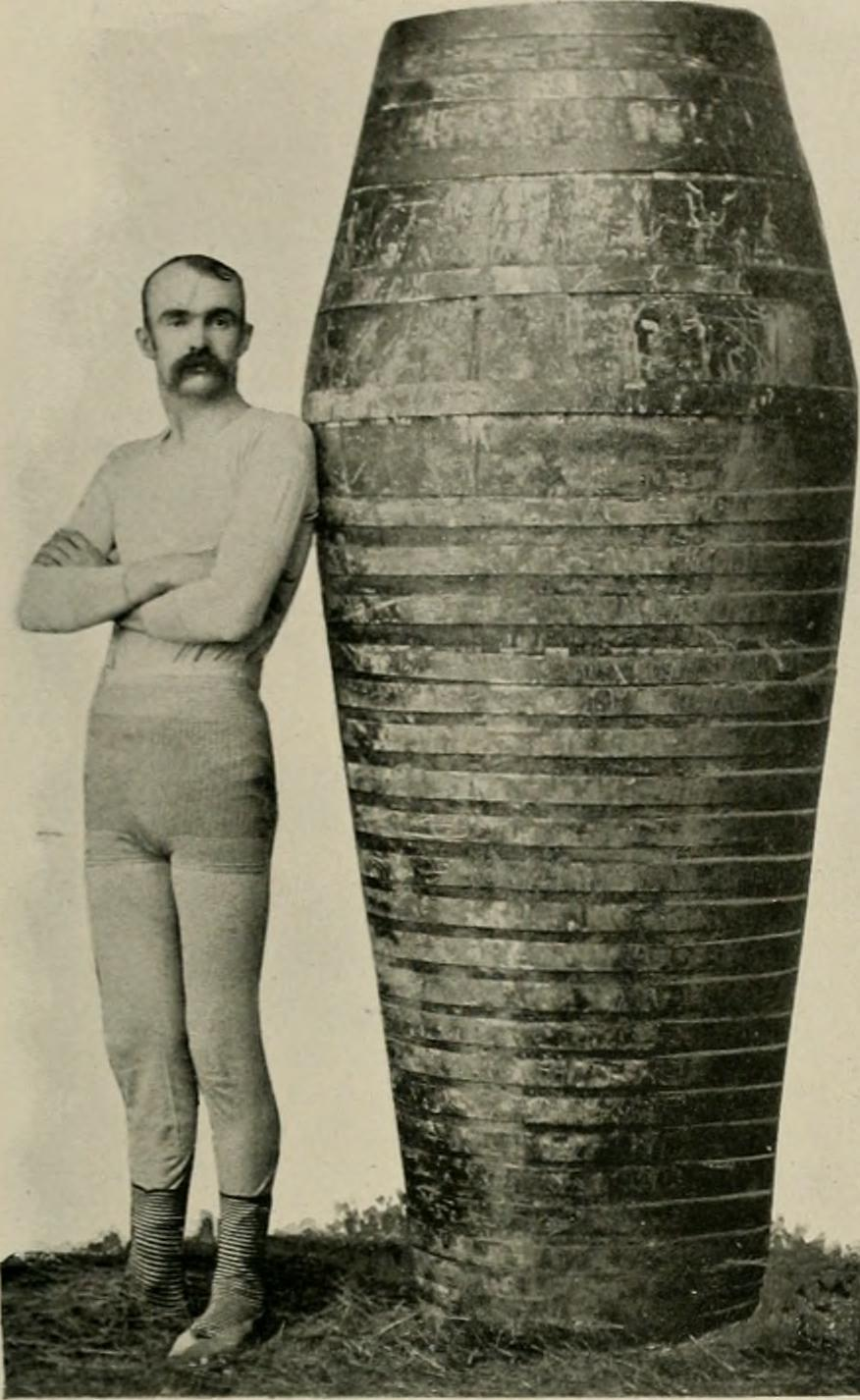
Graham and his barrel

Carlisle D. Graham (December 1850 – May 3, 1909) was an American athlete, famous for surviving several journeys through the rapids at Niagara Falls in a barrel and by swimming, at risk to his life.

In 1886, inspired by the late Captain Matthew Webb, he decided to follow in Webb's footsteps by navigating Niagara Falls and its whirlpool in a barrel cask. Despite warnings of likely death, Graham accomplished his goal on July 11 that year, witnessed by a large crowd. His next attempt, in August of the same year, resulted in the permanent loss of hearing in one ear after a wave struck his head. He did not go over the Horseshoe Falls, which was accomplished by Annie Edson Taylor in 1901 using the same barrel. Graham's challenges extended beyond Niagara Falls and in 1890, engaged in a challenge with British champion diver Tommy Burns in England to dive from Runcorn Railway Bridge.

Graham was married to Barbara and had a daughter. He died in May 1909 at the age of 58, leaving a legacy as the first person to navigate the whirlpool rapids in a barrel and survive. He is buried in Oakwood Cemetery, Niagara Falls, alongside Annie Edson Taylor.

== Early life ==
Graham was born in Wilmington, Delaware in December 1850, although much of his childhood was spent in Canada, near Hamilton on Lake Ontario shores where he learned to swim. At the age of 14, he moved to Philadelphia where he became a cooper. Although he was also a baseball player, he yearned for the sea and in following his desires, made his first voyage to New Orleans.

== Career ==
=== 19th century ===
==== Early efforts ====
In 1886, three years after Captain Matthew Webb lost his life in the rapids, Graham had ambitions to follow in his footsteps and decided upon passing through Niagara Falls and whirlpool in a barrel cask. Despite being told this would result in his death, he persisted regardless and accomplished his objective on July 11 that year, witnessed by a large crowd of spectators. He had previously attempted this unsuccessfully, having at that time been arrested on suspicion of attempting to commit suicide, although was released two hours later. His feat gained him widespread attention. He attempted this feat again a month later on August 19, keeping his head out the barrel which was described as "an amazing sight", until a wave struck the side of his head, resulting in the permanent loss of hearing in one ear. He was joined by three others, although on this occasion he lost his cask and had to swim through the rapids unaided.

He made further journeys in 1887 and again on August 25, 1889, this time in a boat shaped like a barrel. At first, the barrel traveled easily but soon was grasped by more rapid currents which hastened the journey. On several occasions, the boat disappeared from view, on one occasion striking a wave in front of Buttery's elevator, with some believing it to be lost as it was not visible for an extended period of time. Several thousand people gathered to watch him enter the whirlpool, but were disappointed when it was instead carried into quieter waters from the American side, rather than through the main current, as would usually be the case. Despite the dangers faced, he navigated it safely and was picked up just above Lewiston Bridge on the Canadian side.

==== First survival over the falls ====
A week later in September 1889, Graham achieved the ambition of his lifetime, going over the falls and surviving. His wife had been reluctant to consent to his voyage unless his barrel was sent over the falls first, which was done and it managed the trip safely in approximately 35 minutes. Despite this, his wife continued to object, though she was assured it would not be until several days later when Graham would attempt the feat himself. Graham made preparations in case he did not survive the trip, offering his gold watch and $40 (equivalent to $1,300 in 2024) cash to Constable Hern with the instruction that the officer should give the items to Graham's family if he did not complete the journey alive. On describing his attempt, Graham said, "I may be tempting God's providence to try to go over the falls, but it is the ambition of my life to do this. I am satisfied to die if it is necessary. Goodbye, boys." When his barrel was retrieved from the water, it had to be broken as Graham had locked the barrel from the inside with an iron fastener and did not have the strength at that point to release it. He had been in the barrel for around 50 minutes and suffered skinned arms, bruised knees and a blow to the head, although his injuries were not considered serious, except for the blow to the head. His speech was incoherent due to the "racking he had received" and complained of considerable pains in his back and head.

He was afterwards cared for by his wife and remarked to a reporter, "I determined to make the trip this morning because I was satisfied that I could do it safely." He was not able to tell the point he went over the falls, describing that the "awful shaking up I got stupefied me. I felt happy. I felt like a man who has passed into the painless portion of a death by drowning." He declared that he would not attempt the same feat again, as doing it once was enough, noting that he had prepared for the moment for ten years of his life. While Graham was the first person to go through the falls and survive, he did not venture over the Horseshoe Falls, although had offered to do so for $1,000 with little interest. That feat was achieved 12 years later by Annie Edson Taylor in 1901, using the same barrel that Graham used.

==== Competition in England ====
On 15 June 1890, a challenge between him and British champion diver Tommy Burns involved them to each to dive off Runcorn Bridge in England, swim 300 yards (270 m) then run 10 miles (16 km). To evade police, Burns dressed as an old woman and Graham as a laborer. Burns beat Graham on the swim by 10 minutes and subsequently won the race. Following his 94 feet (29 m) jump off Runcorn Bridge on June 19, 1890, he took several similar jumps thereafter.

=== 20th century ===
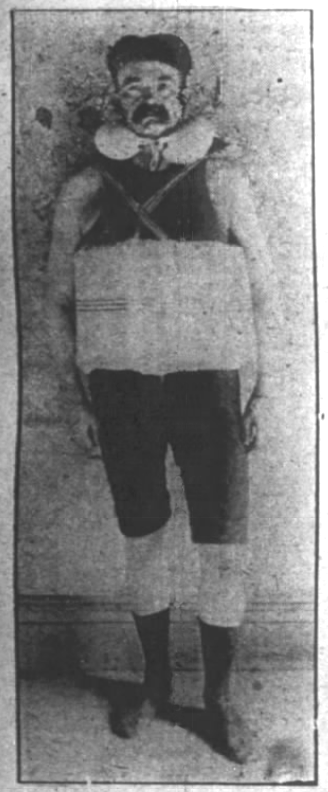
Photo of Carlisle Graham, circa 1902

In July 1901, Graham made his fifth voyage through the rapids in a barrel, watched by about 3,000 people. The journey took around 3 1/2 minutes traveling for about 1 mile (1.6 km) from the time the barrel floated from the rapids and in to the whirlpool. Upon being released from the barrel, Graham was partially suffocated and had to be fanned for 30 minutes due to exhaustion, noting that the lack of air was the primary cause of discomfort during his journey. Having completed the journey with just slight bruising around the knees and elbows, he received $300 (equivalent to $9,000 in 2024) for his feat, with the money paid by businessmen who profited from the crowd that were attracted to witness his voyage. Graham announced in August 1902 that he would "try to do what Captain Webb failed to do on July 24, 1883", which would be to swim Niagara's whirlpool rapids, although it was reported that his friends would attempt to dissuade him from doing so. Wearing a life preserver around his body and a ring around his neck, he completed the swim on August 31, which was his second from the whirlpool to Lewiston and was cheered on by a large crowd. In what would be his last trip through the Niagara rapids, Graham competed in a swimming race on July 17, 1905, with William J Glover of Baltimore. Over a course of 4 miles (6.4 km), Glover won by approximately 4 minutes, finishing in a time of 26 minutes. The race was the first time Glover, then described as "quite a young fellow", had ventured in the rapids and was watched upon by thousands of spectators. Upon being pulled from the water, Glover was described as being "quite chipper", while Graham was "used up" and was carried to a nearby hotel where he had dressings applied to his bruises.

In December 1907, Captain Carlisle Graham, then referred to as the "Hero of Niagara", announced his intention on swimming from Niagara Falls to Montreal in Canada, which is a distance of around 360 miles (580 km) with his Fox Terrier "Beauty". He described how he would use what he described as the "American underhand stroke", believing that it paid to be "thoroughly American" by following out that principle when he swam.

== Personal ==
He was married to wife Barbara (née Haft) sometime around 1890 and had a daughter Mildred, who was born in 1882, who herself married in 1908.

In December 1907, Graham was working as a cooper in Point Breeze, Philadelphia and by that time was a widower at the age of 57. He was described as being "tall, well built and active" while not looking like a man of fifty-seven years.

== Death ==
On May 3, 1909, 58-year-old Graham died at the home of his sister from a cold. He had been visiting Winnipeg. He is buried in Oakwood Cemetery, Niagara Falls, New York, and the inscription on his headstone reads "Carlisle D Graham. First to go through the whirlpool rapids in a barrel and live. July 11, 1886". Annie Edson Taylor, who died many years later, was buried next to him.
