= John B. Grayson =

American military officer

John Breckinridge Grayson
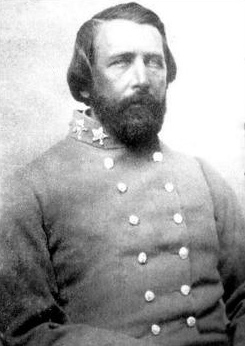
- John B. Grayson, Brigadier General in the Confederate Army
- Born: October 18, 1806; Fayette County, Kentucky, U.S.
- Died: October 21, 1861 (aged 55); Tallahassee, Florida
- Burial place: Saint Louis Cemetery Number 1, New Orleans, Louisiana
- Military career
- Allegiance: United States of America; Confederate States of America
- Branch: United States Army; Confederate States Army
- Service years: 1826–1861 (USA); 1861 (CSA)
- Rank: Major (USA); Brevet Lieutenant Colonel (USA); Brigadier General (CSA)
- Units: 3rd U.S. Artillery; 2nd U.S. Artillery
- Commands: Department of Middle and Eastern Florida
- Conflicts: Second Seminole War; Skirmish of Camp Izard; Action of Oloklikaha; Mexican–American War; Siege of Veracruz; Battle of Cerro Gordo; Battle of Contreras; Battle of Churubusco; Battle of Molino del Rey; Battle of Chapultepec; Battle for Mexico City; American Civil War
- Other work: Career Soldier

John Breckinridge Grayson (October 18, 1806 – October 21, 1861) was a career United States Army officer and a graduate of West Point. He is well known for being a Confederate brigadier general during the American Civil War, his service during the Mexican-American War, and for his early death only three months after joining the Confederate Army of pneumonia and tuberculosis.

== Early life and career ==
John Grayson was born in Kentucky in 1806 to Alfred W. Grayson and Letitia Breckinridge at the Breckinridge family estate of "Cabell's Dale". After his father's death when he was around ten Grayson's mother married Peter Buell Porter. Grayson was appointed to West Point through his ties to three very powerful families the Breckinridges, Graysons, and Porters. He graduated in 1826 and became a second lieutenant in the artillery. He was first assigned to Fort Monroe where he remained for six years. He then served in a variety of southern forts from 1832 to 1835. In 1835 the Second Seminole War broke out in Florida. Grayson fought at Camp Izard and then at the Battle of Oloklikaha. After the Seminole War, Grayson was assigned to New Orleans for eleven years. In 1847 Grayson left to fight in the Mexican-American War where he arrived as a captain of the artillery. Grayson later became the Chief Commissariat of Major General Winfield Scott. Grayson fought in many battles in Mexico including the Siege of Veracruz, Battles of Cerro Gordo, Contreras, Churubusco, Molino del Rey, Chapultepec, and the capture of Mexico City. He became a major for his bravery at the battles of Contreras and Churubusco in 1847. Later that year Grayson was brevetted to lieutenant-colonel for his actions at the Battle of Chapultepec. After the war he was assigned to Detroit, Michigan where he became the Chief of Commissariat for seven years from 1848 to 1855. He would hold this same title in New Mexico until he resigned to join the Confederate Army.

== Civil War service ==
After resigning his commission, Grayson joined the Confederacy in August 1861. Because of his long service and military skills, Grayson was quickly appointed a brigadier general in the Confederate Army. He then immediately became commander of the East and Middle Departments of Florida. Soon after arriving, though, Grayson caught both pneumonia and tuberculosis. He died soon after on October 21, 1861, in Tallahassee, Florida, at the age of 55, not having fought a single battle during the Civil War.

== Notable family ==
- Secretary of War Peter B. Porter, Step-Father
- Colonel Peter A. Porter, Half-Brother
- Attorney General John Breckinridge, Grandfather
- Senator William Grayson, Grandfather
- Vice President, Confederate General, Confederate Secretary of War John C. Breckinridge, 1st Cousin

== See also ==
- List of American Civil War generals (Confederate)
