= William Grayson Carter =

American politician

Member of the Kentucky Senate
- In office 1834–1838

Personal details
- Died: July 11, 1849

William Grayson Carter (died July 11, 1849) was an American politician from Kentucky. William was the son of John Carter (from Loudoun County, Virginia) and Hebe (Williams) Carter, and a grandson of Colonel William Grayson. He was a Kentucky state senator from 1834 to 1838. Carter County, Kentucky is named for him.
