= St. Peter's Episcopal Church (Niagara Falls, New York) =

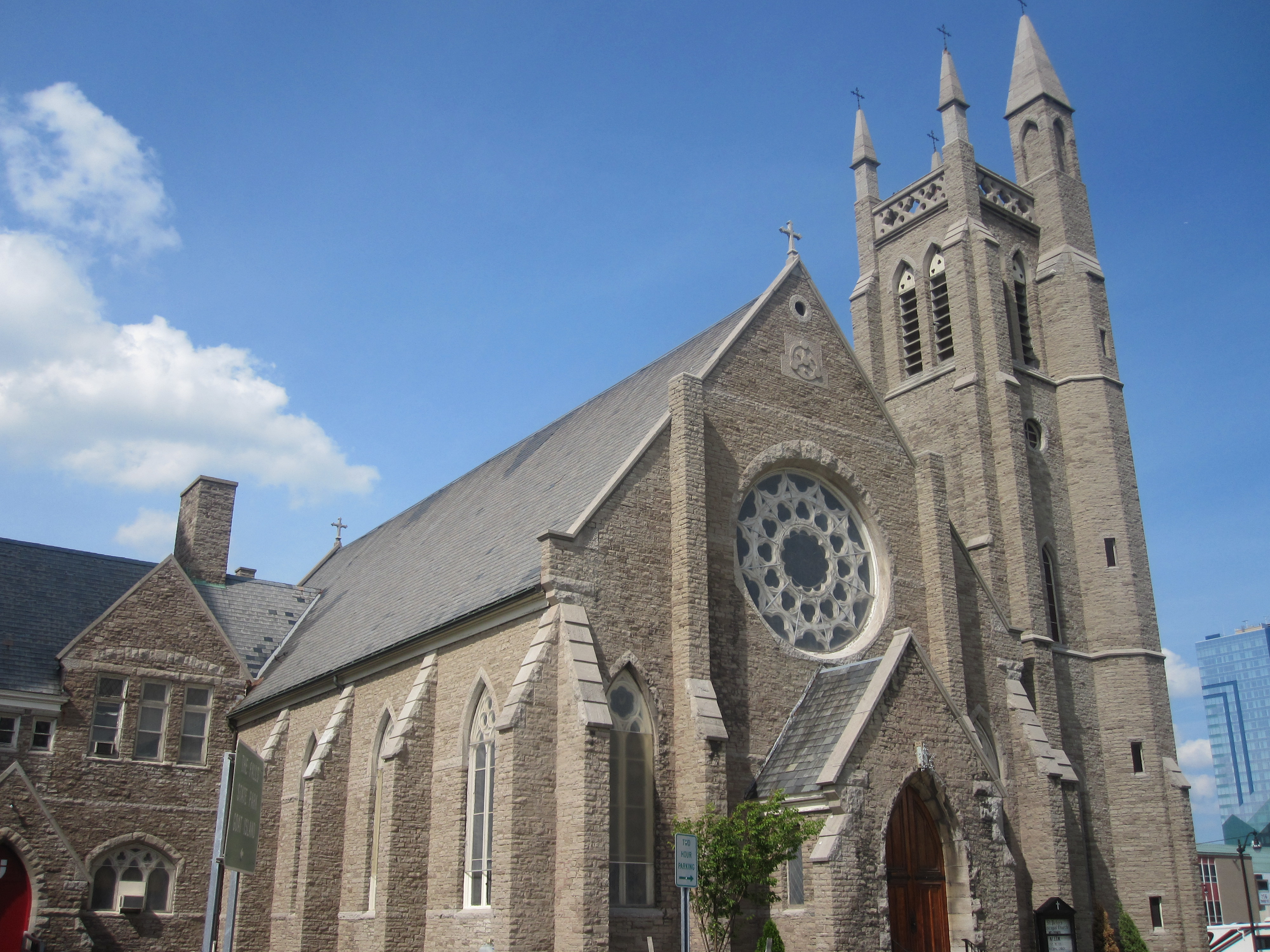
- Church in 2009

- Location within New York
- 43.084642°N 79.06066°W
- Location: 140 Rainbow Boulevard, Niagara Falls, New York 14303
- Country: USA
- Denomination: Episcopal

History
- Former name: Christ Church (1829-1847)
- Status: Church
- Founded: 1823
- Founder: The Rev. Mr. Hopkins (1823)
- Dedication: St. Peter
- Consecrated: 1880 by Bishop A. Cleveland Coxe (current building)

Architecture
- Functional status: Active
- Architect: Henry Dudley
- Style: Gothic
- Groundbreaking: 1873
- Completed: 1880

Administration
- Province: Province 2
- Diocese: Western New York

St. Peter's Episcopal Church, Niagara Falls, New York, is an Episcopalian church in downtown Niagara Falls, New York.

The first church of the name was built in 1847-49 by George Holley on land given for the purpose from the estate of General Peter Buell Porter; the funeral services of his son Col. Peter A. Porter and other members of his family were held here.

The present church was built in 1873–80 to replace it: the architect was Henry Dudley.
