= 8th New York Heavy Artillery Regiment =

8th New York Heavy Artillery Regiment, U.S. Volunteers
- Active: August 22, 1862, to June 5, 1865
- Country: United States
- Allegiance: Union
- Branch: Heavy artillery & Infantry
- Size: 2,575
- Engagements: Battle of Spotsylvania Court House; Battle of North Anna; Battle of Cold Harbor; Siege of Petersburg; First Battle of Deep Bottom; Second Battle of Deep Bottom; Second Battle of Ream's Station; Battle of Fort Stedman (Company L); Appomattox Campaign; Battle of Sailor's Creek; Battle of Appomattox Court House

The 8th New York Heavy Artillery Regiment, U.S. Volunteers was a heavy artillery regiment that served in the Union Army during the American Civil War. The regiment operated as both heavy artillery and infantry beginning in October 1862 while serving in the defenses of Baltimore, Maryland and continued in both capacities until the end of the war.

== Service ==
The regiment was organized at Lockport, New York as the 129th New York Volunteer Infantry and mustered on August 22, 1862, for three years service under the command of Colonel Peter Augustus Porter. Because heavy artillery regiments were needed for the defenses of Baltimore, the regiment was converted from infantry on October 3, 1862, and became the 8th New York Heavy Artillery on December 19, 1862. Companies L and M joined the regiment at Baltimore in February 1864.

The regiment was attached to Defenses of Baltimore, Maryland, VIII Corps, Middle Department, to January 1863. 2nd Separate Brigade, VIII Corps, to July 1863. 2nd Brigade, Maryland Heights Division, Army of West Virginia, to August 1863. 2nd Separate Brigade, VIII Corps, to May 1864. Tyler's Heavy Artillery Division, II Corps, Army of the Potomac, May 15–29, 1864. 4th Brigade, 2nd Division, II Corps, to June 26, 1864. 2nd Brigade, 2nd Division, II Corps, to June 1865.

The 8th New York Heavy Artillery mustered out of the service June 5, 1865. Veterans and recruits of Companies G, H, I, and K were transferred to the 4th New York Heavy Artillery; those of Companies A, B, C, D, E, and F were transferred to the 10th New York Heavy Artillery.

== Detailed service ==
Left New York for Baltimore, Md., August 23, 1862. Garrison duty at Forts Federal Hill, Marshall, and McHenry, defenses of Baltimore, Md. (except from July 10 to August 3, 1863, at Maryland Heights, and a few days in February 1864 at Green Springs Run and Romney), until May 12, 1864. Ordered to join the Army of the Potomac in the field May 12, 1864. Rapidan Campaign May–June, 1864. Spotsylvania Court House May 17–21. Harris Farm or Fredericksburg Road May 19. North Anna River May 23–26. On line of the Pamunkey May 26–28. Totopotomoy May 28–31. Cold Harbor June 1–12. Before Petersburg June 16–18. Siege of Petersburg June 16, 1864, to April 2, 1865. Jerusalem Plank Road June 22–23, 1864. Demonstration north of the James River July 27–29. Deep Bottom July 27–28. Mine Explosion, Petersburg, July 30 (reserve). Demonstration north of the James River August 13–20. Strawberry Plains, Deep Bottom, August 14–18. Ream's Station August 25. Boydton Plank Road, Hatcher's Run, October 27–28. Watkin's House March 25, 1865. Appomattox Campaign March 28-April 9. Crow's House March 31. Fall of Petersburg April 2. Sailor's Creek April 6. High Bridge and Farmville April 7. Appomattox Court House April 9. Surrender of Lee and his army. March to Washington, D.C., May 2–12. Grand Review of the Armies May 23.

== Casualties ==
The regiment lost as a total of 663 men during service; 19 officers and 342 enlisted men killed or mortally wounded, 4 officers and 298 enlisted men died of disease.

== Commanders ==
- Colonel Peter Augustus Porter; killed at Cold Harbor.
- Colonel Willard W. Bates
- Colonel James M. Willett; killed at Petersburg.
- Colonel Joel B. Baker

== Notable members ==
- Sergeant Le Roy Williams, Company G - Medal of Honor recipient for action at the Battle of Cold Harbor

== See also ==
- List of New York Civil War regiments
- New York in the American Civil War
