= Grayson's Additional Continental Regiment =

- Active: 1777–1779
- Allegiance: (United States) Continental Congress
- Type: Infantry
- Size: 9 companies
- Part of: Continental Army
- Engagements: Northern New Jersey (1777); Battle of Brandywine (1777); Battle of Germantown (1777); Battle of Monmouth (1778)

Commanders
- Notable commanders: Colonel William Grayson

Grayson's Additional Continental Regiment was an American infantry unit that served for two years and three months in the Continental Army during the American Revolutionary War. Like other Additional Regiments, Grayson's remained directly under George Washington's control, unlike state regiments. Authorized in January 1777, the unit's nine companies were recruited from the colonies of Virginia, Maryland, and Delaware. Raised by Colonel William Grayson, the regiment participated in actions in Northern New Jersey in early 1777, at Brandywine in September 1777, at Germantown in October 1777, and at Monmouth in June 1778. In April 1779 the regiment was absorbed by Gist's Additional Continental Regiment and ceased to exist.

== History ==
=== Formation to Germantown ===
Grayson's Additional Continental Regiment was authorized on 10 January 1777 for service with the Continental Army and assigned to the main army. William Grayson, a former aide to George Washington was appointed colonel of the regiment. Grayson recruited his soldiers in northern Virginia and in adjacent Maryland where William Smallwood, his soon-to-be brother-in-law was very popular. The regiment assembled at Philadelphia, Pennsylvania in the spring of 1777.

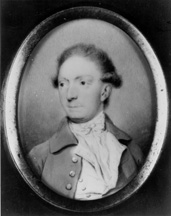
William Grayson

Grayson's regiment was one of 16 planned Additional Continental Regiments. Unlike the September 1776 state regiments, the Additional Regiments were put directly under Washington's control. On 27 December 1776, the Second Continental Congress authorized these units, along with three artillery regiments, 3,000 light cavalry, and an engineer corps. Washington was convinced that capable officers were being held back by the states on political grounds. Activating the Additional Regiments was seen as a way to bring these competent men into leadership roles in the Continental Army. Three Additional Regiments were allotted to Virginia.

On 22 May, the unit was assigned to the 4th Virginia Brigade under the leadership of Charles Scott. The 1st, 2nd, and 3rd Virginia Brigades were led by Peter Muhlenberg, George Weedon, and William Woodford, respectively. The other units in Scott's Brigade were the 4th, 8th, and 12th Virginia Regiments and Patton's Additional Continental Regiment. Grayson's Regiment was present during the skirmishing in northern New Jersey in the late spring and early summer of 1777.

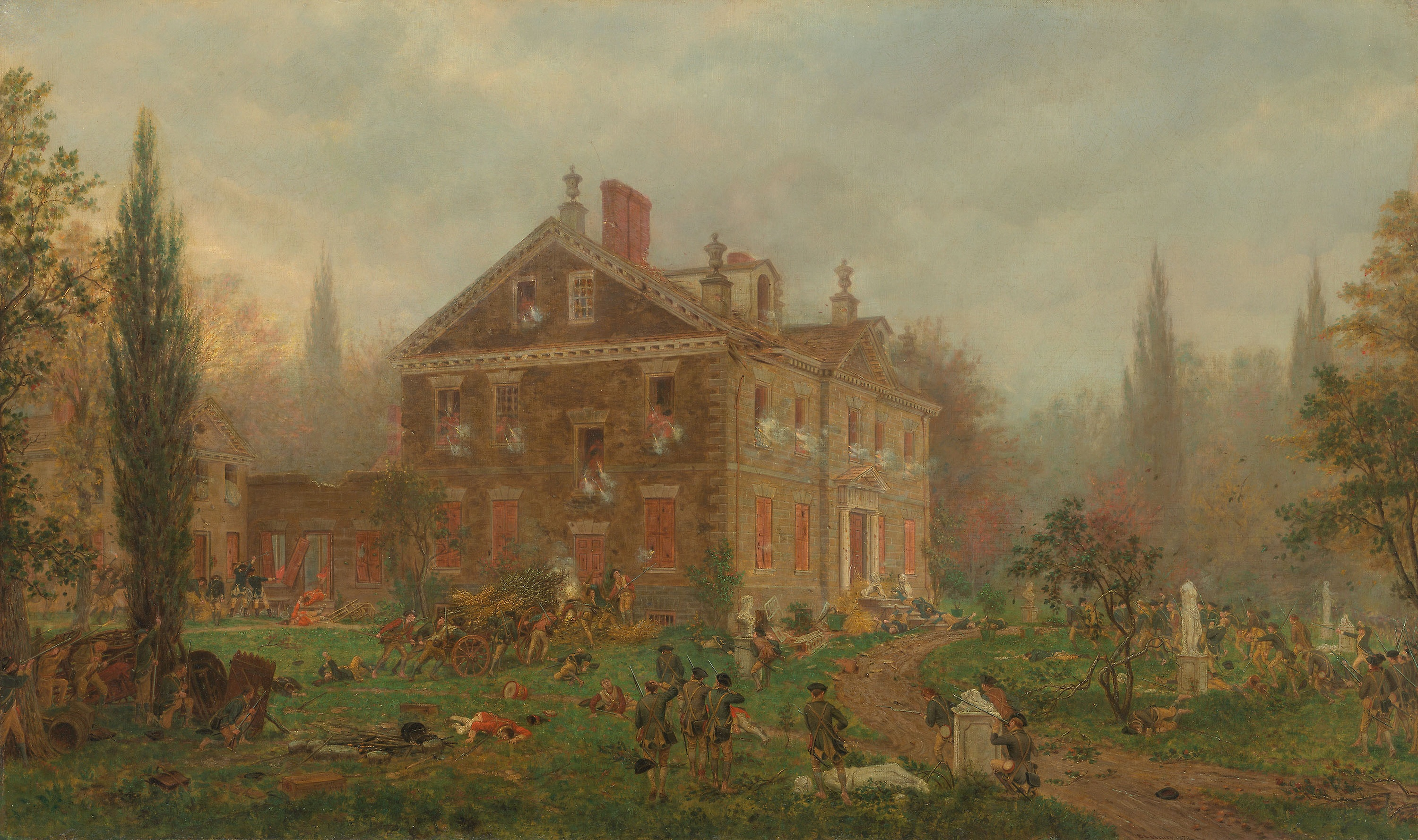
The Battle of Germantown featured fog and "monumental" confusion.

Scott's and William Woodford's brigades were part of Adam Stephen's division at the Battle of Brandywine on 11 September 1777. On that day, Sir William Howe maneuvered one wing of his army 17 miles (27 km) to reach Osborn's Hill in the American right rear. After belatedly learning of Howe's march, George Washington ordered John Sullivan to take charge of his own division plus those of Lord Stirling and Stephen and stop the British. Near the Birmingham Friends Meetinghouse, Stephen's 1,500 men drew up on the right flank, Stirling's 1,500 soldiers defended the center, and Sullivan's troops filed into position on the left. The British outnumbered the Americans by approximately 8,000 to 4,000 men. Stephen's division and two cannons held a wooded hill in a place called Sandy Hollow. As Howe's attack gained momentum, the division stoutly held its position, pinning down the Hessian Jägers and the British 2nd Light Infantry Battalion. Sullivan's division collapsed first, exposing Stirling's left flank. After severe fighting, Stirling's men retreated leaving Stephen's flank in the air. The British then concentrated on Scott's brigade, which held Stephen's left flank. The Virginians' line finally broke and the men retreated to the south. The British captured two cannons which were stubbornly defended by their crews.

Still part of Stephen's division, Scott's brigade marched with Nathanael Greene's left wing at the Battle of Germantown on 4 October 1777. Washington planned for Greene's troops to attack the British right flank while Sullivan and Stirling thrust at the enemy left. Sullivan's and Anthony Wayne's divisions attacked first and drove in the British 2nd Light Infantry Battalion, together with some regiments that marched to their support. However, Greene's column was late arriving on the field and its deployment was marked by "monumental" confusion. The divisions of Greene and Stephen advanced so rapidly that Alexander McDougall's Connecticut Brigade lost track of them in the fog. One observer believed that the brigades of Scott and Muhlenberg (Greene's division) acted together. In fact, Stephen accused Scott of deliberately operating independently. Part of Woodford's brigade and its supporting artillery stopped to fire on 100 British troops at the Chew House. As part of Stephen's division advanced, it spotted one of Wayne's brigades in the fog and a friendly fire incident was the result. Wayne's men, who had carried all before them up to that point, panicked and took to their heels. Stephen was later convicted of unofficerlike behavior and drunkenness and dismissed from the army.

=== Valley Forge to Charleston ===
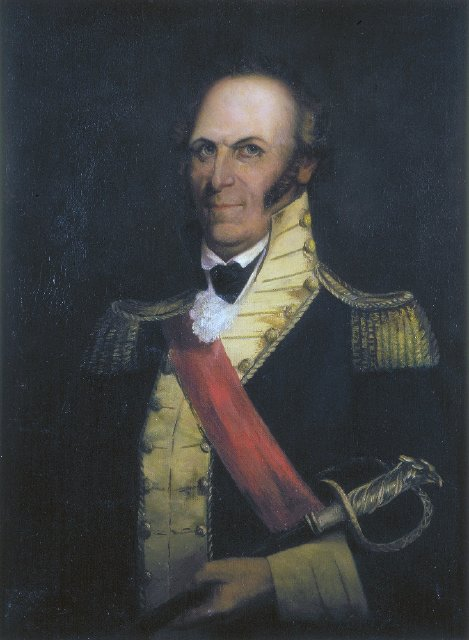
Charles Scott led a task force at Monmouth.

At Valley Forge, Grayson's Regiment was listed as an element of Scott's brigade. The field officers were Colonel Grayson, Lieutenant Colonel Leven Powell, and Major John Thornton. On 28 June 1778, the regiment fought at the Battle of Monmouth. Before the battle, Scott was named commander of a 1,440-man task force consisting of detachments under Richard Butler, Joseph Cilley, Mordecai Gist, and Richard Parker. In Scott's absence, Grayson took charge of the 4th Virginia Brigade which became known as Grayson's Detachment. This force numbered 33 officers, 124 noncoms, 15 staff personnel, and 455 rank and file fit for duty. Besides Grayson's Regiment, the other units were a converged battle group of the 4th, 8th, and 12th Virginia Regiments under James Wood, Patton's Additional Continental Regiment, and Thomas Wells' two-gun company of the 3rd Continental Artillery Regiment.

As part of Charles Lee's Advance Guard, Grayson's Detachment led the American column of march on the morning of the battle. After a skirmish, Philemon Dickinson's New Jersey militia was driven back by the Queen's Rangers. When Grayson's Detachment came on the scene, the Queen's Rangers retreated eastward. Dickinson advised Grayson not to advance any farther because it would a put narrow bridge behind his troops with British troops hovering nearby. However, Lee created an ad hoc command made up of Grayson's Detachment, Butler's detachment, Henry Jackson's detachment, and Eleazer Oswald's four cannons and sent the troops forward under Wayne. Seeing British troops around 9:30 AM, Wayne ordered Butler and Jackson to engage them while keeping back Grayson's men to guard a key road intersection. Wayne's men skirmished with their adversaries.

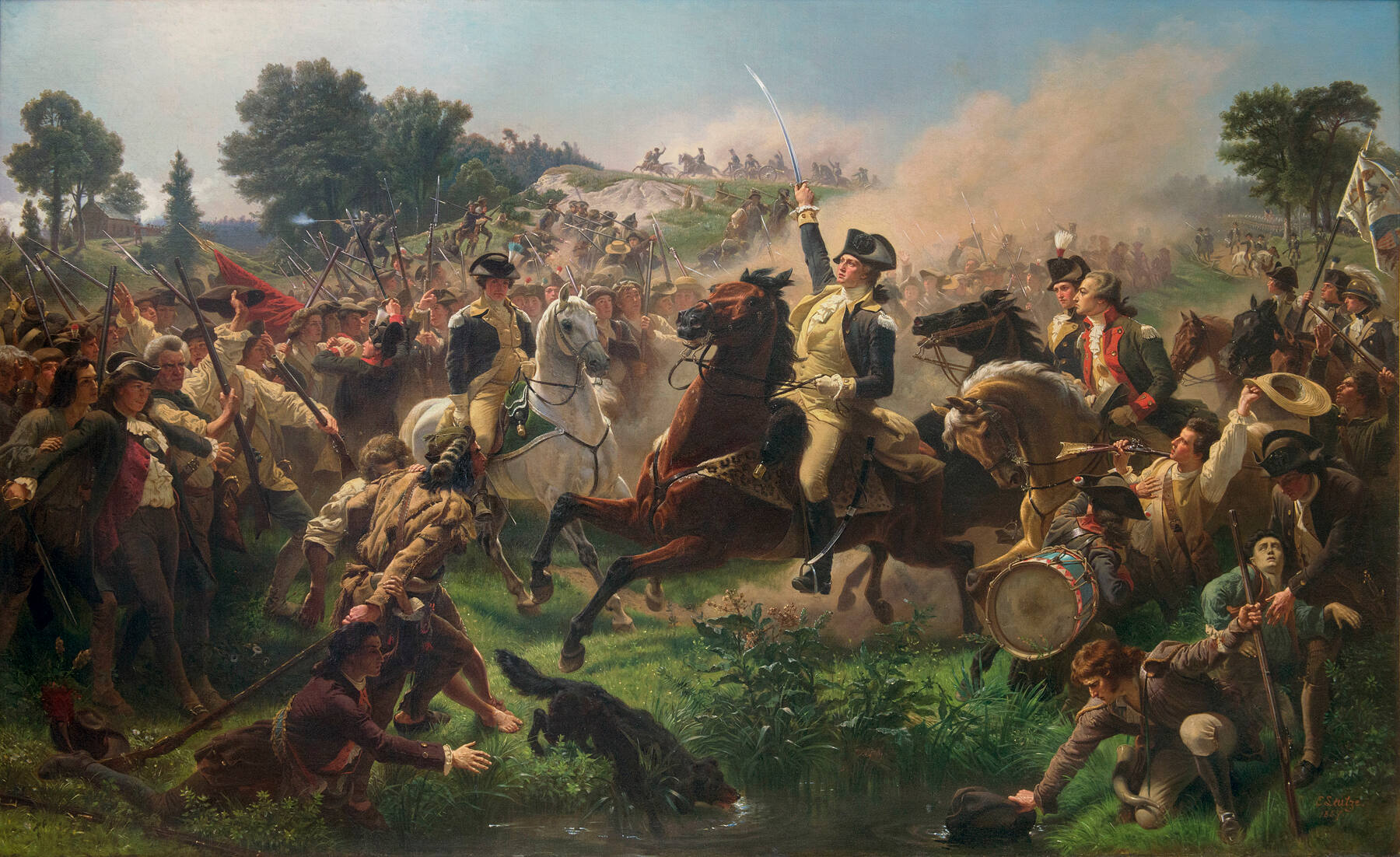
Washington Rallying the Troops at Monmouth by Emanuel Leutze

Grayson suggested to Jackson that they attack the British right wing, but Jackson declined. Lee still believed that he faced a small rear guard. But, he soon observed that Sir Henry Clinton was bearing down on him with at least 6,000 troops. At this time, some American units began to withdraw without orders. Jackson had seen two of Oswald's guns pulling back and asked Lee's aide John Francis Mercer for new orders. Mercer told Jackson to hold his ground, but when he returned he found that Jackson was retreating. Mercer then ordered Grayson to pull back as well. Threatened by the advancing British columns, Butler also fell back, taking a detour to the north to get away. Finding 3,000 of his troops withdrawing, Lee ordered a general retreat. Oswald's massed 10 guns to cover the movement.

As Washington rode forward, he was surprised to see Lee's division retreating toward him, led by Grayson's and Patton's Additional Regiments. The men were suffering badly from the intense heat of the day. Farther on, Washington and Lee patched together a line consisting of Jeremiah Olney's brigade, detachments under Walter Stewart, Nathaniel Ramsey, and Henry Livingston Jr., and Oswald's four guns. It is likely that Wood's Virginians (though not Grayson's Regiment) were part of this force. After a fierce action, the British broke through, but the holding action allowed enough time for Washington's main body to form a line of battle. Except for two New Jersey regiments and Cilley's and Parker's detachments, Lee's division was sent to the rear to reorganize.

Grayson's Regiment transferred to the 3rd Virginia Brigade on 22 July 1778, though it still formed part of the main army. On 15 November the remaining men of Thruston's Additional Continental Regiment were attached. The regiment's career came to an end on 22 April 1779 when it and Thruston's Regiment merged with Gist's Additional Continental Regiment and the new unit reorganized in eight-company strength. The consolidated unit was captured by the British army at the siege of Charleston on 12 May 1780. This disaster resulted in the capture of at least 2,650 Continentals plus militia.

== Service record ==
Designation	Date	Brigade	Department
Grayson's Additional Regiment	10 January 1777	none	Main Army
Grayson's Additional Regiment	22 May 1777	4th Virginia	Main Army
Grayson's Additional Regiment	22 July 1778	3rd Virginia	Main Army
Grayson's Additional Regiment	22 April 1779	none	consolidated
