= Oakwood Cemetery (Niagara Falls, New York) =

Historic cemetery in New York, United States

- Interactive map of Oakwood Cemetery

Details
- Established: February 9, 1852
- Location: Niagara Falls, NY
- Country: United States
- Coordinates: 43.097°N 79.050°W
- Type: Public
- Owned by: Oakwood Cemetery Association
- Size: 18.5 acres (7.5 ha)
- No. of graves: over 22,000
- Website: Oakwood Cemetery Niagara Falls, NY
- Find a Grave: Oakwood Cemetery
- Footnotes: Staff. "NPS Focus: 14000581". National Register of Historic Places. National Park Service.

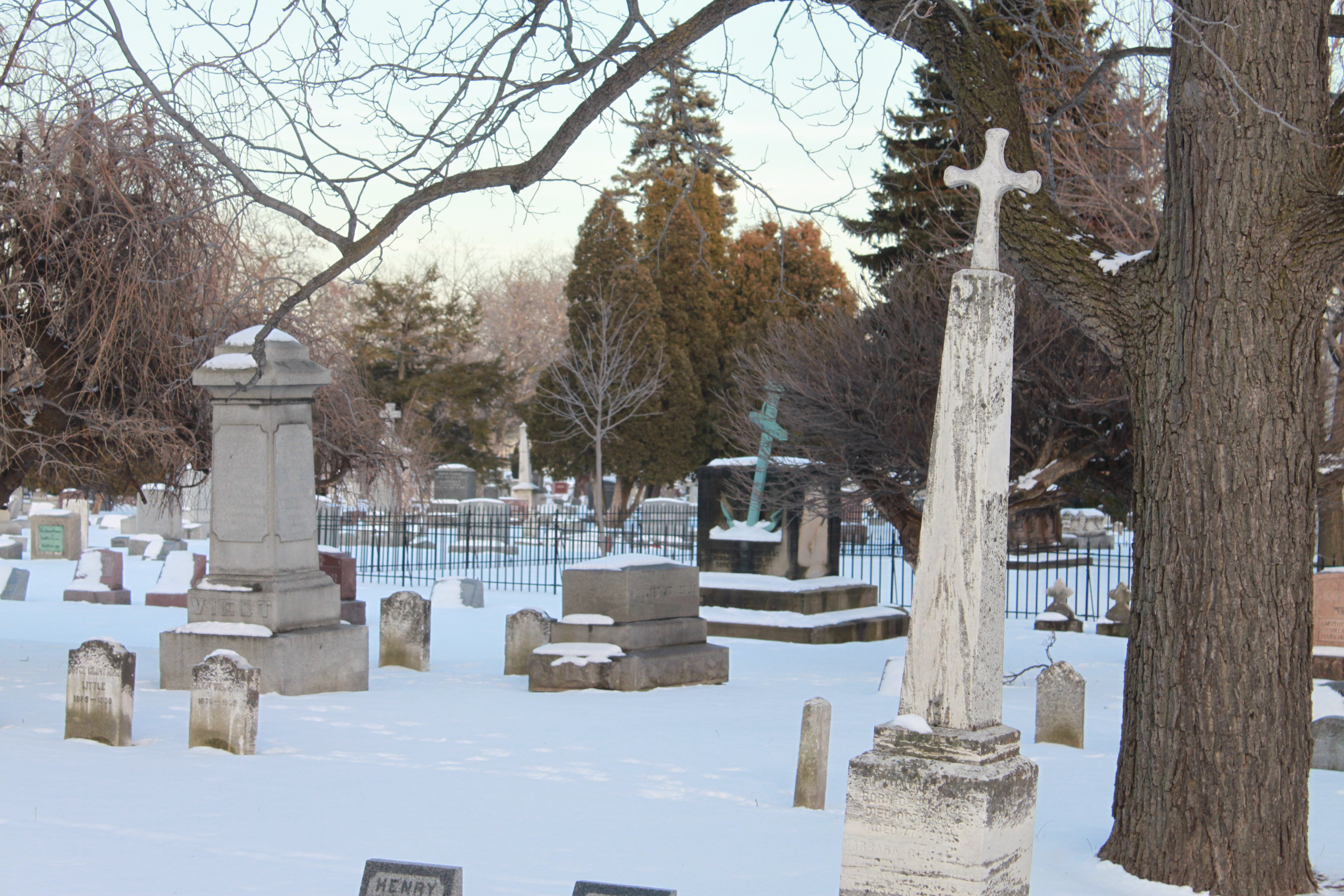
Oakwood Cemetery in Winter

Oakwood Cemetery in Niagara Falls, New York was founded in 1852 after land was donated by Lavinia Porter. It covers over 18 acres (1 km^{2}) and over 19,000 are buried there. The cemetery was listed on the National Register of Historic Places in 1984.

== Overview ==
Celebrating over 170 years of service, Historic Oakwood Cemetery and the Oakwood Mausoleum were facing needs for the maintenance of this beautiful Niagara Falls treasure. The Board of Directors of the Oakwood Cemetery Association voted unanimously in 2010 to embark on a restoration project for the cemetery and the mausoleum. Local, state, and National Register designations are being pursued to both protect the historic site and to make it eligible for public and private historic preservation grants. A historic landscape report will evaluate the cemetery grounds and recommend a plan for restoration and a historic conditions report will accomplish a similar goal for the Mausoleum.

Historic Oakwood Cemetery was begun in 1852 on land donated by Lavinia Porter, daughter of Judge Augustus Porter. The Judge was one of the acknowledged founders of Niagara Falls, and one of its largest landowners. The original layout of the cemetery was designed by Civil Engineer T.D. Judah. The Oakwood landscape we know today dates from a design drawn in 1882 by noted Niagara Falls civil engineer Drake Whitney (nephew to the three Whitney sisters for which "Three Sisters Islands" are named.)

In 1913, Oakwood built a magnificent marble mausoleum, designed by the Buffalo architectural firm Green and Wicks. The Oakwood Mausoleum was built to the very highest standards with foot-thick walls of concrete covered by hand cut gray Vermont marble. The exterior features soaring stone columns supporting a centered entrance portico. Within were crypts for over 350 interred individuals, and the interior was faced and floored in white Vermont marble, lit by clerestory windows and two stained glass windows (one by Louis Comfort Tiffany). Huge bronze doors enter into a chapel space centered in the mausoleum.

Oakwood would become the final resting place for families whose names are associated with the growth and development of Niagara Falls as a great industrial city and a world-renowned tourist attraction. Along with the Whitneys, these families include the Schoelkopfs of hydroelectric power fame, the Oppenheims, the Silberbergs, the Pfohls, the Haeberles, the Tattersalls, the Holleys, and both Porter brothers.

Among those buried at Oakwood, one finds Annie Edson Taylor, the first person to travel over the falls in a barrel, Homan Walsh, the young kite flyer whose kite and progressively larger ropes sent the cable across the gorge for the suspension bridge, and the famed "Hermit of Goat Island". The cemetery also includes a memorial to "Comrades of the Grand Army of the Republic", veterans of the Civil War, and there is one Commonwealth service war grave, of a Canadian soldier of World War II.

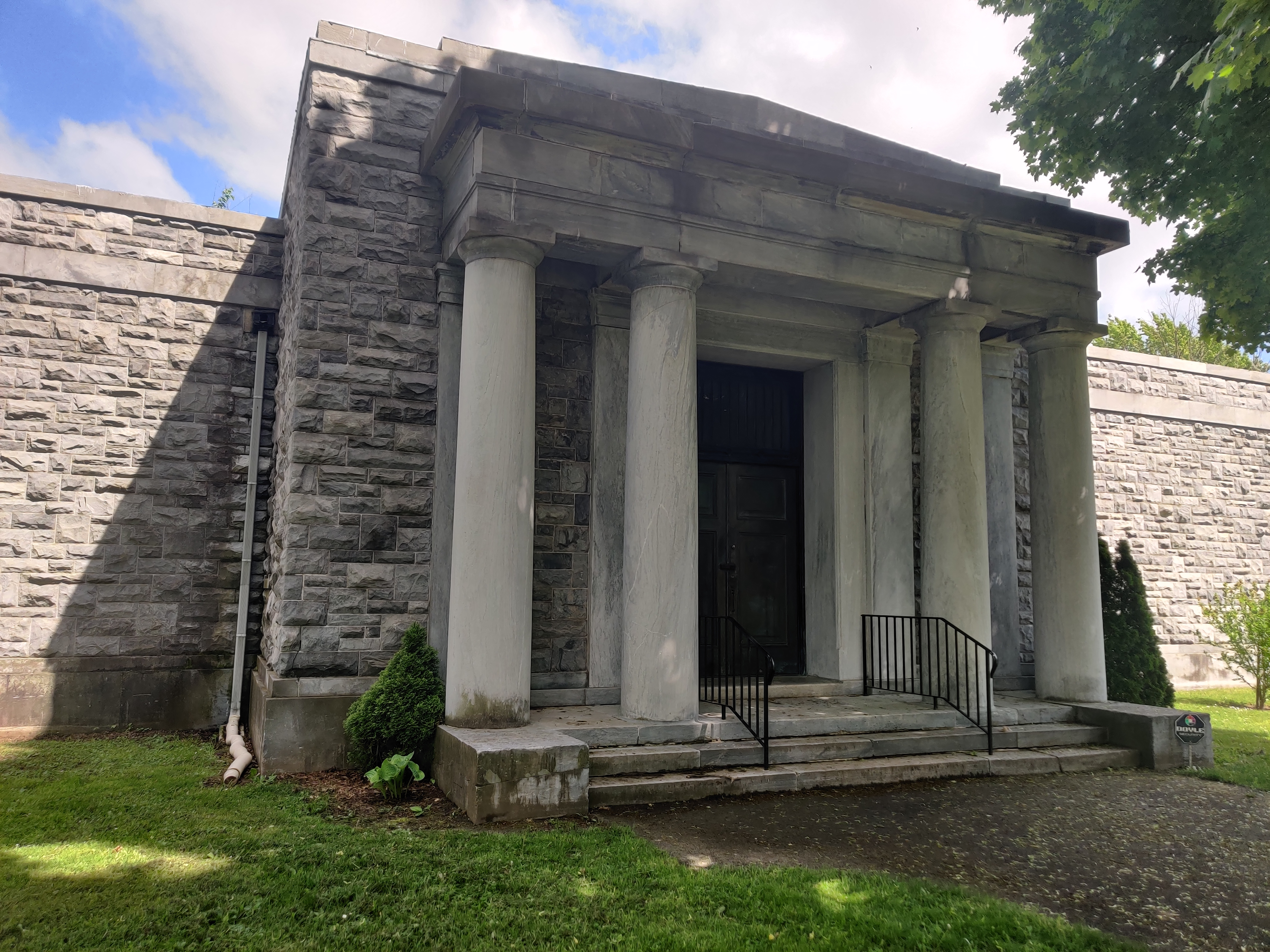
Photo of the mausoleum in Oakwood cemetery

Oakwood today contains many examples of funerary art including obelisks, sarcophagi, and statuary. Additionally, the landscape contains mature plantings and trees, many dating from the earliest time of the cemetery. It continues to serve the community with the crematory, columbarium, and gravesites, including newly available family plots formed by the expansion of previously smaller burial sites.

== Notable burials ==
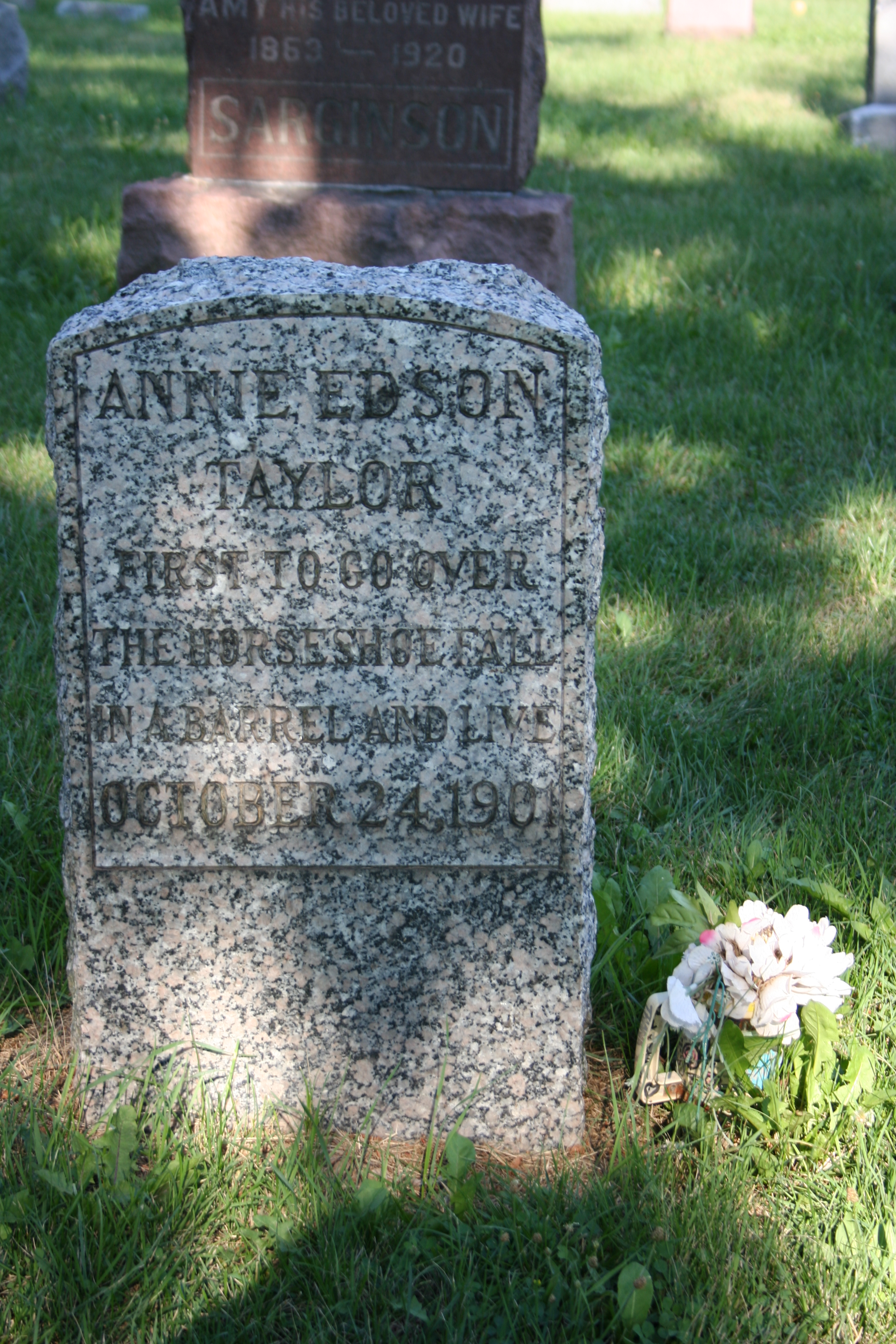
Annie Edson Taylor's grave

- Francis Abbott – also known as the "Hermit of Niagara".
- Carlisle Graham – first person to go through the lower rapids in a barrel.
- Augustus Porter – Niagara County judge.
- Peter Buell Porter – Niagara County resident and general.
- Arthur Schoellkopf – fifth Mayor of Niagara Falls, New York and pioneer in harnessing the hydroelectric power of Niagara Falls.
- Annie Edson Taylor – first person over Niagara Falls in a barrel.
- Homan Walsh – 16-year-old boy that flew his kite and connected the American and Canadian sides of the Falls so that the first Suspension Bridge could be built.
- Matthew Webb – first person to swim the English Channel; died trying to swim the Niagara rapids.
- Le Roy Williams – Civil War Medal of Honor recipient.

== See also ==
- List of cemeteries in New York
- National Register of Historic Places listings in Niagara County, New York
