= Thruston's Additional Continental Regiment =

- Active: 1777–1779
- Allegiance: (United States) Continental Congress
- Type: Infantry
- Size: 4 companies
- Part of: Continental Army
- Engagements: Battle of Brandywine (1777); Battle of Germantown (1777); Battle of Monmouth (1778)

Commanders
- Notable commanders: Colonel Charles Mynn Thruston

Thruston's Additional Continental Regiment was an American infantry unit that served for a little more than two years in the Continental Army during the American Revolutionary War. Authorized in March 1777, four companies were organized in Virginia during the spring and summer of 1777. George Washington appointed influential Shenandoah Valley political leader Charles Mynn Thruston as colonel in command. The regiment participated in the Philadelphia Campaign in late 1777. One company was detached from the regiment on 4 April 1778 and became part of Hartley's Additional Continental Regiment. The unit was present in the Monmouth Campaign in June 1778. What was left of the regiment was attached to Grayson's Additional Continental Regiment on 15 November 1778. Grayson's and Thruston's Regiments were absorbed by Gist's Additional Continental Regiment on 22 April 1779 and Thruston's Regiment ceased to exist.

== History ==
On 28 March 1777, George Washington wrote a letter to George Weedon. The following part concerns Thruston's Regiment.

I have therefore made Captain Washington, Major of Moylan's light Dragoons, and Captt. Thornton Major of a Regiment to be raised by Colo. Thruston in Virginia, with the chance of being Lieutt. Colonel of it, if Angus McDonald refuses that offer. This appointment must, I should think, be more agreeable to Thornton, than to be thrown into an Eastern Regiment, provided it could be raised, of which there is little prospect, as the Massachusetts have added a large additional Bounty to that allowed by Congress, which puts a total stop, Henly writes me, to his inlisting a Man. Thornton is authorised to facilitate the recruiting of Thruston's Regiment, and will, I hope, exert himself to the utmost, in getting it completed, especially as Thruston's wound will render it impossible for him to take an active part for some time to come, and McDonald's acceptance of the Lieutt. Colonelcy much doubted here.

== Service record ==
Designation	Date	Brigade	Department
Thruston's Additional Regiment	15 March 1777	none	Main Army
Thruston's Additional Regiment	15 November 1778	none	attached to Grayson's
Thruston's Additional Regiment	22 April 1779	none	consolidated
