= William Grayson =

American politician (1736–1790)

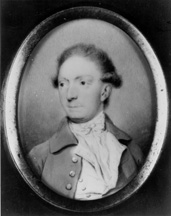

United States Senator from Virginia
- In office March 4, 1789 – March 12, 1790
- Preceded by: Constituency Established
- Succeeded by: John Walker

Member of the Virginia House of Delegates for Prince William County
- In office 1788–1789 Serving with Cuthbert Bullitt
- Preceded by: Daniel Carroll Brent
- Succeeded by: Henry Washington

Member of the Continental Congress from Virginia
- In office 1785–1787

Member of the Virginia House of Delegates for Prince William County
- In office 1784–1785 Serving with Alexander Scott Bullitt
- Preceded by: Arthur Lee
- Succeeded by: Arthur Lee

Personal details
- Born: 1736 Prince William County, Virginia
- Died: March 12, 1790 (aged 53–54) Dumfries, Virginia
- Party: Anti-Administration
- Spouse: Eleanor Smallwood
- Relations: William Grayson Carter (grandson); John B. Grayson (grandson); Alexander D. Orr (nephew)
- Education: University of Pennsylvania

Military service
- Allegiance: United States
- Branch: Continental Army
- Years of service: 1776-1779
- Rank: Colonel
- Commands: Grayson's Additional Continental Regiment
- Battles/wars: American Revolutionary War: Philadelphia campaign; Battle of Brandywine; Battle of Germantown; Winter at Valley Forge 1777-78; Battle of Monmouth

William Grayson (1736 – March 12, 1790) was a planter, lawyer and statesman from Virginia. After leading a Virginia regiment in the Continental Army, Grayson served in the Virginia House of Delegates before becoming one of the first two U.S. Senators from Virginia, as well as a leader of the Anti-Federalist faction. Grayson became the first member of the United States Congress to die while holding office.

== Early and family life ==
Grayson was born in 1736 to Benjamin and Susannah (Monroe) Grayson at Belle Aire Plantation. (Note: Tyler (1915) (and other early sources as well as recent sources which rely on him), gives his birth date as 1736 or 1740, which would have made the guardianship unnecessary, although the papers survive) in what is now Woodbridge, Virginia. His father had emigrated from Scotland to the confluence of the Potomac River and Quantico Creek which became Dumfries, Virginia. Benjamin Grayson Sr. became a successful merchant and planter, as well as militia officer and (by 1731) one of the justices of the peace (who jointly governed the vast county of that day, in addition to their judicial duties). Their mother, twice-widowed, had been born to an important family upriver in Westmoreland County and had children by her previous marriages to Charles Tyler and William Linton (also a Scottish-born merchant). One of her nephews, James Monroe, would later serve in the Continental Army, succeed this man as U.S. Senator from Virginia and became President of the United States. Susanna Grayson bore three sons (Spence, Benjamin Jr. and William) and a daughter (also Susanna) in this marriage before she died in 1752, when this boy was ten. His father remarried, to another widow, Sarah Ball Ewell, who also had children by prior marriage, but none in this marriage before her husband died in 1757.

William was sixteen when his father died, so his eldest brother (Benjamin Grayson Jr.) became his legal guardian until he reached 21 years. Benjamin Grayson Jr. and Spence Grayson, being the elder brothers, inherited their father's business and plantations approximating 2,800 acres in Prince William County, by a will drafted in 1753 which was admitted to probate in 1758 but no longer exists. However, William was well-provided for from the personal estate (which required a 10,000 bond), especially compared to his future commander, George Washington (whose far smaller inheritance caused him to earn a living by surveying beginning as a teenager). One of the Grayson plantations included a house on a hill above Dumfries that became known as "Grayson's Hill" and later "Battery Hill" (for a Confederate battery during the American Civil War). The other, Belle Aire (often confused with a plantation about five miles inland with the same pronunciation but the name Bel Air which was owned and operated by the Ewell family) was between the Occoquan River and Neabsco Creek near the ferry (later bridge) conducting the King's Highway across the Occoquan River and which became Woodbridge, Virginia. It had been the property of William Linton a previous husband of this man's mother, Susan, who married Benjamin Grayson by 1732.
William Grayson received his first schooling locally under Charles Tyler, and later became known for familiarity with Latin and Greek as well as English history. His guardian allowed his education in Philadelphia at the University of Pennsylvania, and (after graduating) William Grayson sailed to England. Although some family sources claim he studied law for two and a half years, and received his degree from the University of Oxford, neither university nor Inns of Court documentation exists to support that tradition, so he was likely apprenticed to British merchant bankers like William Lee. When his brother and guardian Benjamin faced financial troubles in 1762 (so that he mortgaged his entire estate to his brother Spence), William returned home and as his need for a guardian ended, found that his spending abroad had also diminished the capital he had inherited. Grayson married Eleanor Smallwood, a sister of Maryland Governor William Smallwood, who survived him. They had four sons (Frederick, George, Robert and Alfred) and a daughter (Hebe).

== Return to the Virginia colony ==
About three years after returning to Virginia (probably at the conclusion of a clerkship with a local lawyer), Grayson began practicing law in Prince William County and three nearby counties. The county seat was at Dumfries, Virginia, a port town (now the oldest in the state) not far from Grayson's home as well as Belle Aire Plantation, which his brother Spence Monroe Grayson (1737–1798) inherited in 1757. On the other side of the Occoquan River lay Fairfax County, Virginia, which had split from Prince William County when Grayson was a boy. The wealthiest planter families (who could hire lawyers to protect their interests) owned land in both counties, and often held positions on church vestries, responsible for social welfare activities, including caring for orphans and the poor. Thus Grayson was familiar with local leaders, especially George Mason and George Washington, who served on the vestry of Pohick Church. Furthermore, after his brother Spence Grayson was ordained an Anglican priest in England in 1771, he served as rector of Cameron and Dettingen parishes in Prince William County, so both brothers socialized with Rev. Scott of Pohick Church both vestries.

== American revolutionary ==
Grayson became involved in the political prelude to the Revolution in Virginia. He was on various Committees of Correspondence and military preparedness, as did nearby planters, including Richard Henry Lee with whom he would serve as the inaugural U.S. Senators from Virginia.

In June 1776 he became an assistant secretary to George Washington, and was promoted as an aide-de-camp to Washington in August, which came with the rank of lieutenant colonel. In January 1777, William Grayson recruited a regiment for the Continental Army known as Grayson's Additional Continental Regiment, and served as its colonel (and Spence as its fighting chaplain). The Regiment was attached to General Charles Scott's Brigade and saw frequent action in late 1777 in the Philadelphia Campaign, notably in the delaying skirmishes in Northern New Jersey, the Battle of Brandywine and the Defense of Philadelphia. In the winter of 1777-78, he led his troops to Valley Forge where they suffered privations, and emerged in the spring with considerably fewer men fit for service. On June 28, 1778, Grayson was central to the Battle of Monmouth. In Scott's absence, Colonel Grayson took temporary command of the brigade, which was in the vanguard of an assault as part of Charles Lee's Advance Guard. Grayson and the brigade were in the center of the battle in 100 degree heat, and held a far superior force to a stalemate, when Lee took personal command of all of his forces, while Grayson himself returned to Washington's field command. General Lee badly misunderstood intelligence he was receiving, and the line broke into a disorganized retreat. Subsequently, Lee was court-marshalled by Washington, and Grayson, as one of the key officers at Monmouth, had to testify at the proceedings. In 1778, William Grayson served on a commission dealing with war prisoners. In 1779, he resigned his military commission to serve on the Congressional Board of War.

== Post-War career ==
In 1781 Grayson returned to Dumfries and his legal practice. Like many Continental Army officers, he was an original member of the Society of the Cincinnati. He was also elected as a member to the American Philosophical Society in 1780.

Like his brothers, Grayson owned slaves. In the 1787 Virginia tax census, by which time his eldest brother Benjamin Jr. had died, William Grayson owned eight enslaved adults in Prince William County, as well as four enslaved teenagers, two horses and eighteen cattle, compared to Rev. Spence Grayson, who owned fourteen enslaved adults, 21 enslaved teenagers, ten horses and 17 cattle. Grayson's political career began in 1784, when he won election as one of Prince William County's two delegates (part time) in the Virginia House of Delegates. He replaced Arthur Lee and the following year would be replaced by the same man, who was then removed from office as disqualified by his federal office. Grayson had not stood for re-election because he was a delegate to the Confederation Congress from 1785 to 1787. While in that office, he helped to pass the Northwest Ordinance, including a provision that forbade slavery in the Northwest Territory.

As an Anti-Federalist, he joined George Mason, James Monroe, and Patrick Henry in opposing ratification of the proposed new United States Constitution at the Virginia Ratification Convention in 1788. In that Convention, Grayson argued that the proposed constitution was neither fish nor fowl—neither strong enough for a national government nor decentralized enough for a federal one — and thus eventually would either degenerate into a despotism or result in the dissolution of the Union.

Grayson experienced the inflation caused by Virginia and other states issuing paper fiat currency during the Revolutionary War. He later wrote to James Madison that:

The Ancients were surely men of more candor than We are; they contended openly for an abolition of debts in so many Words, while we strive as hard for the same thing under the decent and specious pretense of a circulating medium. Montesquieu was not wrong when he said the democratical might be as tyrannical as the despotic, for where is there greater act of despotism than that of issuing paper to depreciate for the paying debts, on easy terms.

== United States Senate ==
Although the Anti-Federalists lost the battle in opposition of the new Constitution, Patrick Henry, Virginia's leading Anti-Federalist, rewarded Grayson by arranging his election to the first United States Senate. Grayson served from March 4, 1789, until his death on March 12, 1790. He and Richard Henry Lee were the only members of the first Senate who had opposed ratification, and so they were unhappy when the Bill of Rights omitted any provisions making serious corrections to the division of powers between the central government and the states. Grayson continued to believe that the Philadelphia Convention had struck precisely the wrong balance.

== Death and legacy ==
Grayson and his family had moved to Frederick County, Virginia (where his widow ultimately died), but he died at the home of his brother Rev. Spence Grayson on March 12, 1790. He hand wrote a will shortly before his death which appointed executors and charged them to make "all my slaves born since Independance [sic] of America Free", which will was admitted to probate in Frederick County, despite some difficulties with the court clerk, on December 7, 1790. He was the first member of the United States Congress to die in office.

Rev. Spence Grayson survived another eight years, and both are interred in the Grayson family vault, with the current address (pathway and historical marker) at 2338 W. Longview Drive, Woodbridge. However, the house long out of family hands was used as a field hospital during the Civil War and the vault tomb dynamited. The estate of Richard Stonnell (who had owned the property and died in 1857) was finally settled though special chancery commissioner Eppa Hunton Jr. in 1887, with S.B. Stonnell receiving a deed and erecting a frame house atop the remaining foundation. The tomb's restoration was opposed by the property owner in 1975, but the Daughters of the American Revolution restored it in 1981 and further restoration occurred in 2005, and 2014, despite the remainder of the property being in private hands.

A grandson, William Grayson Carter, became a Kentucky state senator; another grandson was Confederate General John Breckinridge Grayson.

Spence Grayson's son John Robinson Grayson (born in 1779 at Belle Aire), was captured near the Occoquan River from the brig Polly, operated by Lund Washington. Impressed into the British Navy, upon his release in 1800, John Grayson became a captain in the United States Navy. During the War of 1812, Capt. Grayson commanded a squadron of gunboats off Georgia, where he settled. The original Belle Aire house, as well as mortuary vault, were destroyed during the American Civil War. The mortuary vault was rebuilt, encased in concrete and buried by the Daughters of the American Revolution in the early 20th century. Grayson County, Kentucky, the city of Grayson, Kentucky, and Grayson County, Virginia, were all named for the senator. in 1976, Prince William County erected a gazebo in Merchant Park beside the Weems-Botts Museum to honor William Grayson, and Virginia also erected a highway marker on Route 1 to commemorate him.

== See also ==
- List of members of the United States Congress who died in office (1790–1899)

== Bibliography ==
- Heitman, Francis Bernard (1914). Historical Register of Officers of the Continental Army during the War of the Revolution. Washington, D.C.: Rare Book Shop Publishing Company.
- Horrell, Joseph, ed. (1984). New Light on William Grayson: His Guardian's Account. Virginia Magazine of History and Biography vol. 92.
- Sinks, John D. (November 12, 1995). "The Contributions of the Grayson Family to the American Revolution".
- Tyler, Lyon Gardiner (1915). Encyclopedia of Virginia biography. New York: Lewis historical publishing company.

U.S. Senate
Preceded by None	U.S. senator (Class 1) from Virginia; March 4, 1789 – March 12, 1790; Served alongside: Richard H. Lee	Succeeded by John Walker
