= Battle of Paulus Hook =

Battle of the American Revolutionary War

Coordinates: 40.70757°N 74.03961°W

- Part of the American Revolutionary War
| Date | August 19, 1779 |
| Location | Paulus Hook, New Jersey |
| Result | American victory |

Belligerents
| United States | Great Britain |

Commanders and leaders
| Henry Lee III | William Sutherland |

Strength
| 300 | 250 |

Casualties and losses
| 2 killed 3 wounded 7 captured | 50 killed and wounded 158 captured (including 7 to 9 officers) |

The Battle of Paulus Hook was fought on August 19, 1779, between Continental Army and British forces in the American Revolutionary War. The Patriots were led by Major Light Horse Harry Lee, and launched a nighttime raid on the British-controlled fort in what is today downtown Jersey City. They surprised the British, taking 158 prisoners, and withdrew with the approach of daylight. Despite retaining the fort and its cannons, the British lost much of their control over New Jersey. Lee was rewarded by the Second Continental Congress with a gold medal, the only non-general to receive such an award during the war.

== Background ==
In 1776, prior to the start of the war, General George Washington ordered American patriots to construct several forts to defend the western banks of the Hudson River, one of which was located at Paulus Hook. The fort was a naturally defensible position that guarded New York from British attack, guarded the Hudson River channel and the gateway to New Jersey. Following the defeat of General Washington and the Continental Army at the Battle of Brooklyn, the British landed at Kip's Bay took control of New York City on September 15, 1776. That same day, the British turned their warships towards Paulus Hook. On September 23, the American patriots abandoned the fort and moved munitions and supplies up to the Village of Bergen, leaving the fort to become the first New Jersey territory invaded and occupied by the British.

In mid-summer 1779, a 23-year-old Princeton University graduate, Major Henry "Light Horse Harry" Lee, recommended to General Washington a daring plan for the Continental Army to attack the fort, in what became known as the Battle of Paulus Hook.

== Battle ==
At four o'clock on the afternoon of August 8, 1779, Major Lee, with four hundred infantry and a troop of dismounted dragoons started from New Bridge (now River Edge, New Jersey), on a march of 14 miles (23 km) through the woods to make an attack upon the British fort at Paulus Hook. He detached patrols of horse to watch the communication with the North River and stationed parties of infantry at different roads leading to Paulus Hook. At Union Hill he filed into the woods where by the guide's timidity, or treachery, the march was prolonged to three hours before gaining the right road.

Major Lee and his men reached Prior's Mill at 3 am, August 19, 1779; at 3:30 they reached the ditch at what is now the intersection of Newark Avenue and Warren Street. The tide was rising but Lieutenant Rudolph found the canal fordable, and led by Lieutenants McCallister and Rudolph the troops pushed through and soon gained possession of the outer fort. Major Sutherland, who was in command of the fort, retired into a small redoubt with a few officers and forty Hessians. It was nearly daylight and Major Lee had no time to dislodge them. He had intended to burn the barracks, but on finding sick soldiers, women and children in them he refrained. He retreated, carrying with him one hundred and fifty-nine prisoners, officers and men. He lost two men killed, and had three men wounded.

Captain Forsyth was ordered to Prior's Mill to collect such men as were most fit for action and take a position on Bergen Heights to cover the retreat. This position was in the woods near Bergen and Sip avenues (today's Journal Square), said to be about the site now occupied by Dr. Hornblower's house, 631 Bergen Avenue. Dr. Hornblower's grandmother was then a little girl, Anna Merselis, and that morning in looking for a cow, she came upon Lee's soldiers, who detained her while they waited, to prevent her carrying any report of their presence to possible enemies. The troops remained there until messengers had been sent to ascertain if the boats that Major Lee had arranged to have in waiting for him at Dow's Ferry were there. He had intended to cross the Hackensack River and by the Belleville Turnpike reach the high ground east of the Passaic River, and thus return to New Bridge; but the boats had been removed to Newark and Major Lee with ruined ammunition and tired men, encumbered with prisoners, was obliged to return by a route liable to be interrupted by troops from New York City. With undaunted courage and wise precautions the brave troops started on the return march of fourteen miles to New Bridge; at "Weehock" (today's Weehawken) Captain Catlett came up with fifty men and good ammunition. At the Fort Lee road Colonel Ball met him with two hundred fresh men, and Major Lee and his men safely reached New Bridge about one o'clock in the afternoon. The English were greatly annoyed and the Americans exceedingly jubilant over the affair.

In a letter to Congress, George Washington said:

The Major displayed a remarkable degree of prudence, address and bravery upon this occasion, which does the highest honor to himself and to all the officers and men under his command. The situation of the fort rendered the attempt critical and the success brilliant.

== Congressional resolution ==
On the 24th of September, Congress passed the following resolutions respecting the affair:

Resolved, That the thanks of Congress be given to His Excellency General Washington for ordering with so much wisdom, the late' attack on the enemy's fort and work at Powles Hook.
Resolved, That the thanks of Congress be given to Major General Lord Stirling for the judicious. measures taken by him to forward the enterprise and to secure the retreat of the party.
Resolved, That the thanks of Congress be given to Major Lee for the remarkable prudence, address and bravery displayed by him on the occasion; and that they approve the humanity shown in circumstances prompting to severity as honorable to the arms of the United States, and correspondent to the noble principles on which they were assumed.
Resolved, That Congress entertain a high sense of the discipline, fortitude, and spirit manifested by the officers and soldiers under the command of Major Lee in the march, action and retreat, and while with singular satisfaction they acknowledge the merit of these gallant Men, they feel an additional pleasure of considering them a part of an army in which very many brave officers and soldiers have proved, by their cheerful performance of every duty under every difficulty, that they ardently wish to give the truly glorious examples they now receive.
Resolved, That Congress justly appreciates the military caution so happily combined with daring activity by Lieuts. McCollister and Rudolph in leading on theforlorn hope.
Resolved, That a medal of gold emblematical of this affair be struck, under the direction of the Board of Treasury, and presented to Major Lee.
Resolved, That the brevet and the pay and subsistence of Captain be given to Lieuts. McCallister and Rudolph respectively.

== Medal ==
Congress also gave Major Lee $15,000 to be distributed among the soldiers engaged in the attack. On one side of the medal awarded to Major Lee is a bust of him, with the words Henrico Lee, Legionis Equit Praefecto Comitia Americana. The American Congress to Henry Lee, Colonel of Cavalry." On the reverse, Non Obstantib fluminibus vallis astutia et virtute bellica parva manu hostes vicit victosq armis humanitate devinxit. In mem. pugn. ad Paulus Hook, die XIX August, 1779. "Notwithstanding rivers and entrenchments, he with a small band conquered the foe by warlike skill and prowess and firmly bound by his humanity those who had been conquered by his arms. In memory of the conflict at Paulus Hook, nineteenth of August, 1779."

== See also ==
- American Revolutionary War § Stalemate in the North. Places ' Battle of Paulus Hook ' in overall sequence and strategic context.
