= Niagara Tunnel Project =

Engineering project

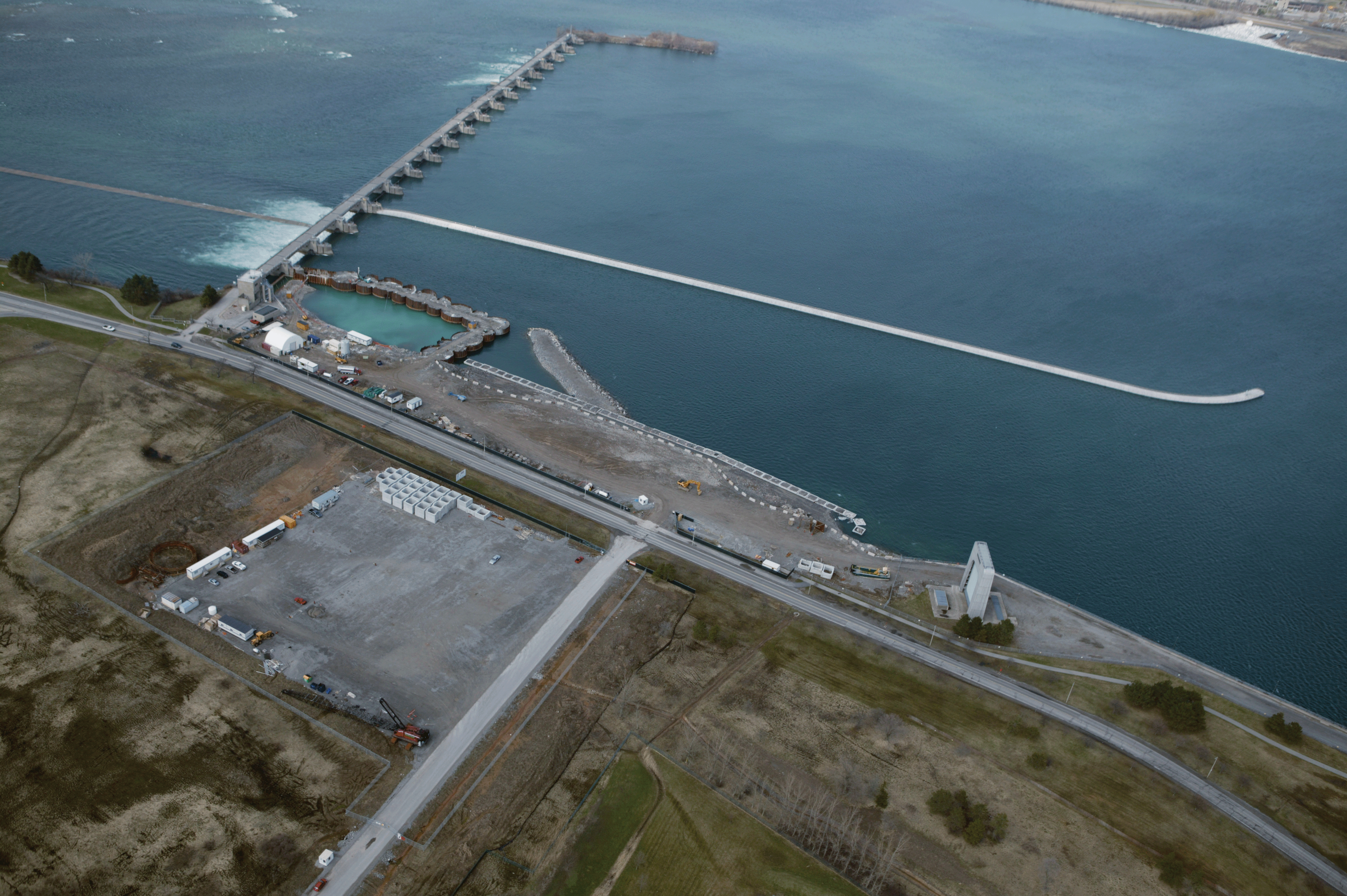
The Niagara Tunnel Project's intake point (near Upper Rapids Boulevard) under construction in 2010.

The Niagara Tunnel Project was part of a series of major additions to the Sir Adam Beck hydroelectric generation complex in Niagara Falls, Ontario, Canada.

Water delivered by the major new tunnel complements other upgrades to the Sir Adam Beck Hydroelectric Generating Stations, resulting in more efficient use of the Niagara River's hydro power.

The project's new 12.7 metres (42 ft) diameter, 10.2 kilometres (6.3 mi) long tunnel was officially placed into service on 21 March 2013, helping to increase the generating complex's nameplate capacity by 150 megawatts, with the extra power produced enough for approximately 160,000 homes.

== Background ==
First constructed in 1922, the initial Sir Adam Beck power generating station, now abbreviated as SAB 1, derived its water supply from a hydro canal connected to the Welland River. Increased power demand necessitated a second generating station, SAB 2, to be constructed in 1954. SAB 2 derives its water supply from the Niagara River via two diversion tunnels, each about 9 kilometres (5.6 mi) in length. In 1958, a reservoir and the SAB Pump Station were constructed in order to make better use of available water by storing it during periods of low demand and using it in periods of greater demand in order to maximize the efficiency of the stations in regards to electricity supply and demand.

Between 1996 and 2005, Ontario Power Generation (OPG), which owns and operates the SAB complex, completed a series of major upgrades at the SAB 2 plant, increasing its potential generating nameplate capacity by 194 megawatts. Water delivered through the new Niagara Tunnel Project complements the SAB 2 upgrade, and results in an overall increase to the efficient use of the Niagara River's hydro power.

The new 10.2 kilometres (6.3 mi) long tunnel is 12.7 metres (42 ft) in diameter, or about four storeys in height, and allows an additional diversion of a distant part of the Niagara River to reach the SAB plant complex at a rate of about 500 cubic metres (18,000 ft^{3}) of water per second, a flow rate that can fill an Olympic-sized swimming pool in seconds. The Ontario Government considers the Niagara Tunnel Project and the Sir Adam Beck complex as integral to its efforts to close all of the province's coal-fired generating plants as part of its clean and green energy program.

Upon the project's formal opening the Honourable Bob Chiarelli, M.P.P., Ontario's Minister of Energy, stated that "This project is a source of pride as an engineering feat and as a practical solution for meeting Ontario's energy needs through clean sources".

== Construction ==
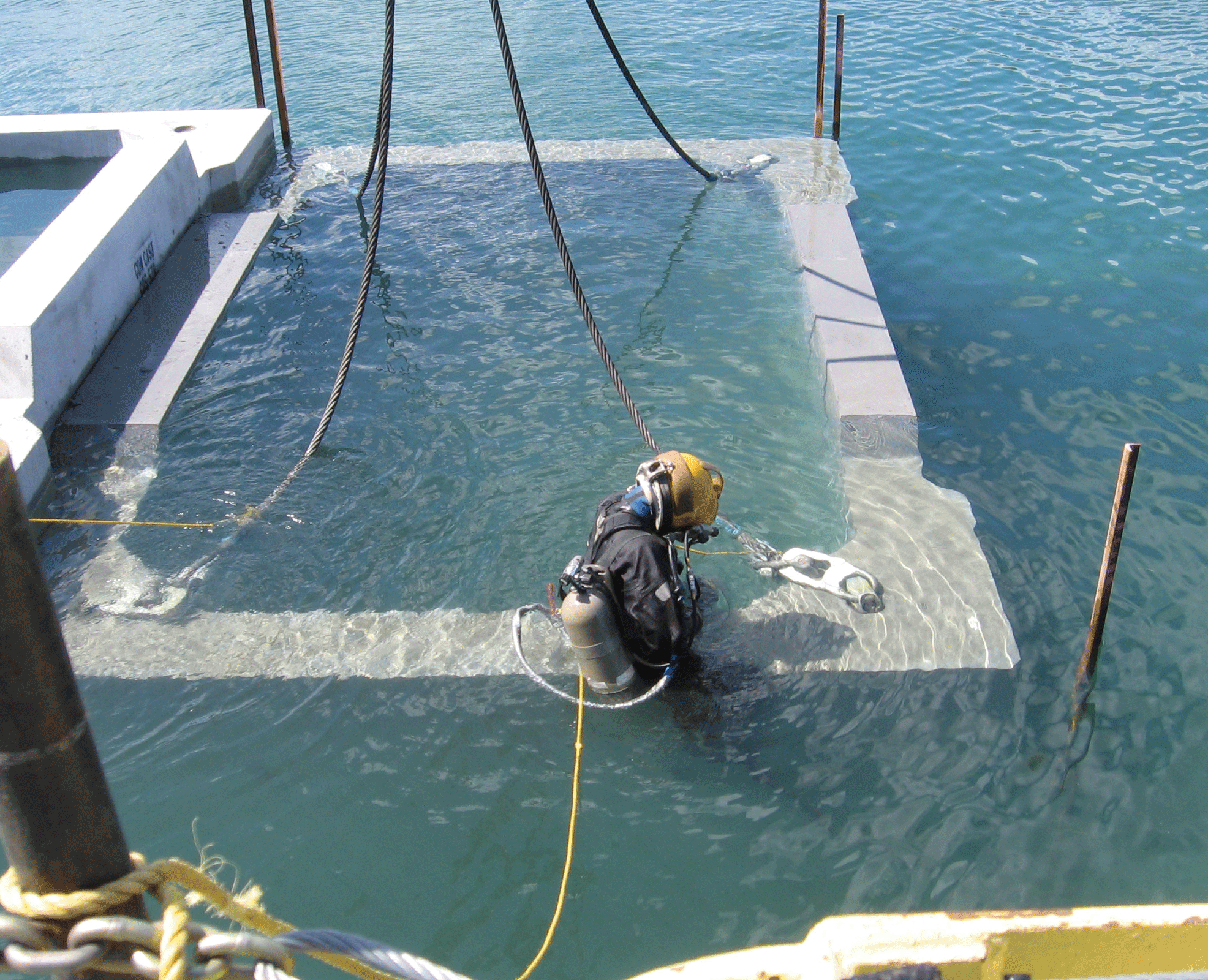
Construction work in 2010

The Niagara Tunnel was constructed using a Tunnel Boring Machine (TBM), affectionately named "Big Becky" in honour of Sir Adam Beck. The TBM machine bored a tunnel about 10.2 kilometres (6.3 mi) long and about 14.4 metres (47 feet) in diameter under the City of Niagara Falls, Ontario, from the Niagara River to the SAB complex. The bored tunnel was subsequently lined with an impervious membrane and a concrete lining, pre-stressed by high pressure grouting. The massive undertaking created about 1.6 million cubic metres of rock and debris, and was designed for a minimum 90-year life span.

The HP 471-316 TBM was driven by 15 electric motors totaling about 4.7 megawatts of power (6,375 horsepower), built by the Robbins Company of Solon, Ohio, and was the world's largest hard-rock tunnel boring machine as of 2006. The TBM operated as deep as 140 metres (460 ft) below ground level to avoid the machine's vibrations being felt at surface level. The design-build contractor for the project was the Austrian construction company Strabag AG, a large construction group with extensive experience in large tunnel construction.

Boring by the Hatch Mott MacDonald Engineering Company started on 15 September 2006 at the north end, located at 43°08′25.2″N 79°03′44.2″W and ended on 31 March 2011 at the south end, located at 43°04′10.72″N 79°03′33.77″W.

Due to slower than projected boring progress caused by constant tunnel roof over-breaks, the project completion date was extended to at least December 2013, with a revised total projected cost of $1.6 billion.

== Completion and commissioning ==
On 21 March 2013 the Ontario Power Generation Corporation (OPG) and the Ontario Government officially placed the new Niagara tunnel into service with a formal opening ceremony and tour. The OPG reported that the project will be financially rewarding despite being completed four years later than planned and about $500M over its originally estimated cost. OPG's president and CEO Tom Mitchell stated: "This was a large, complex project that will serve Ontario for more than 100 years".

The tunnel project was completed at a total cost $100 million lower than its revised $1.6 billion budget, and with an in-service date of 9 March 2013. The operational start-of-service date was nine months sooner than the project's revised schedule that was drawn up in 2009 due to unexpected and difficult geological conditions encountered in the soft Queenston Shale Formation during the tunnel boring process.

The new tunnel will provide enough additional water to the Sir Adam Beck generating complex to produce power for approximately 160,000 homes.

The Niagara Tunnel Project was selected by International Water Power & Dam Construction as the North American Project of the Year for 2013.

== See also ==
- Energy storage
- Hydropower
- List of energy storage projects
- Ontario Green Energy Act of 2009
- Ontario Power Generation
- Sir Adam Beck
