= Hatch Ltd =

Engineering and management consultancy

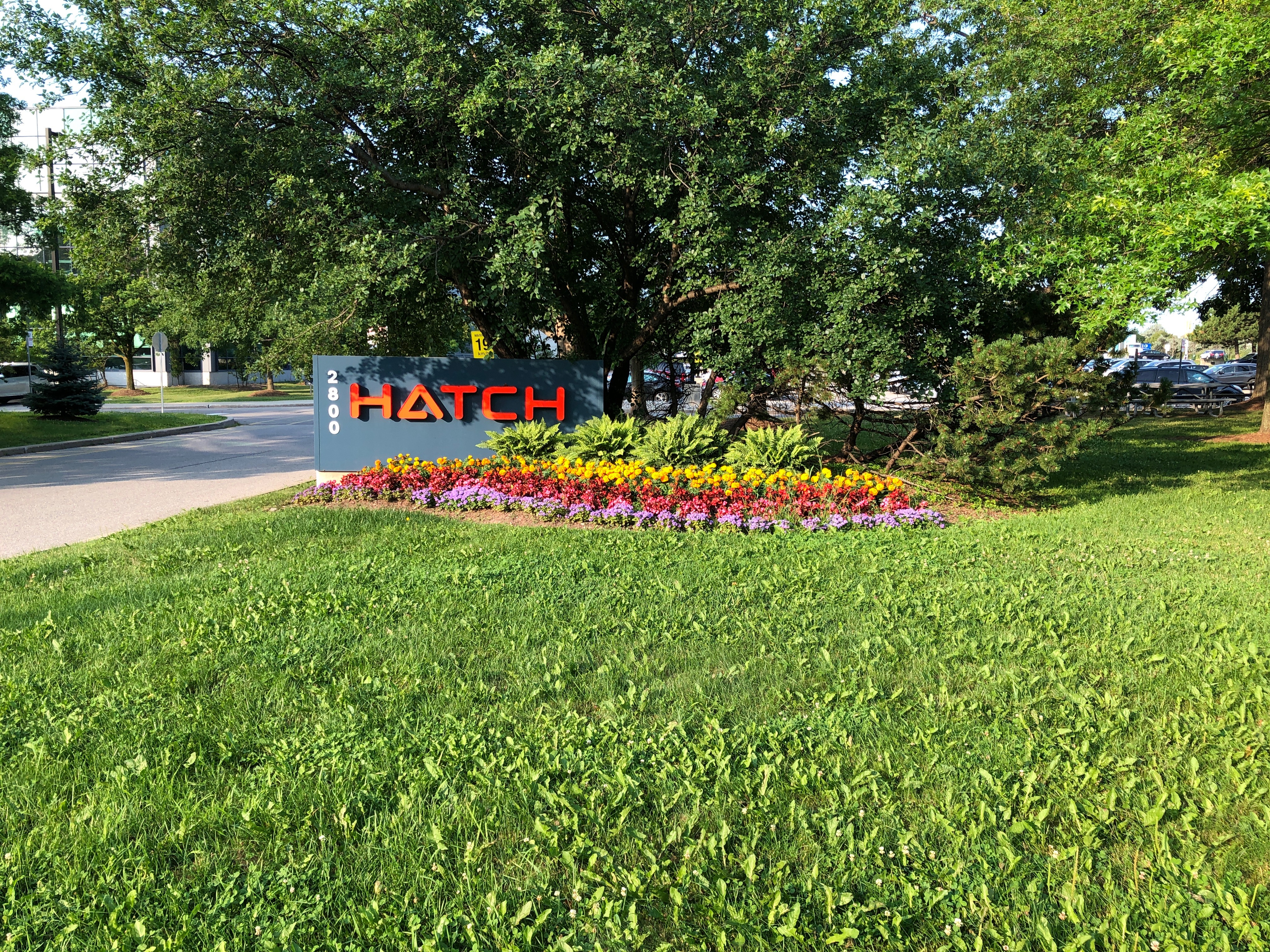
- Type: Private; Employee-owned corporation
- Industry: Engineering and management consultancy
- Founded: 1955
- Headquarters: Mississauga, Ontario
- Area served: Canada, Australia, South Africa, United Kingdom, United States, Mexico, India, China, Russia, Brazil, Colombia, Peru, Chile, Oman, Saudi Arabia, United Arab Emirates, Indonesia, and New Caledonia.
- Key people: John Bianchini (Chairman and CEO)
- Services: Engineering and management consultancy
- Number of employees: 10,000 (2023)
- Website: www.hatch.com

Hatch is a global multidisciplinary management, engineering and development consultancy. Its group companies have more than 10,000 staff in 70+ offices. In 2015, Hatch was ranked as a top 20 International Design Firm according to the Engineering News-Record (ENR) rankings.

The company was founded in Toronto, Ontario, Canada, by W.S. Atkins as W.S. Atkins & Associates in 1955. The company initially was involved in subway tunneling and other civil engineering projects, and expanded into metallurgy when Gerry Hatch joined the company in January 1958 as president. Over the next decade, the company grew from five employees to 60. He purchased the company in 1962, renaming it Hatch.

Hatch counts among its metals clients the major mining and metals companies in the world, including Alcan, Alcoa, BHP, Barrick Gold, BlueScope, Glencore (and predecessor Falconbridge), Vale (and predecessor Inco) and Rio Tinto.

Hatch retired as president in 1988 and as chairman in 1990. In 1996, the company began an expansion program by purchasing several aligned engineering companies including Billiton Engineering (1996), Rescan Mining (1998), BHP Engineering (1999), Kaiser Engineers (2000), Acres International (2004), and MEK Engenharia (2012). By 2005 the combined billing of the company was around C$700 million.

Hatch today provides consulting, operations support, technologies, process design, and project and construction management to clients in three principal sectors: mining and metals; energy; and infrastructure.

The company's main offices are in Canada, Australia, South Africa, Chile, China, Brazil, Peru, United Kingdom, and United States. They also have several smaller offices around the globe.

On November 1, 2020, Hatch acquired LTK Engineering Services – a global engineering firm in the rail transportation sector.

== Business areas and sectors ==
Hatch Sectors
Metals & Minerals	Energy	Infrastructure
Alumina & Bauxite, Aluminium, Coal, Copper, Diamonds, Gold, Iron Ore, Iron & Steel, Lead, Zinc, & Tin, Lithium, Magnesium, Nickel, Phosphates, Potash, Rare Earth Elements, Silver, Titanium, Uranium	Upstream oil & gas, Midstream oil & gas, Downstream oil & gas, Renewable Power, Water Power, Thermal Power, Nuclear Power, Power Integration, HVDC	Aviation, Highways & Bridges, Ports & Marine, Rail & Transit, Transportation, Tunnels, Urban Solutions, Natural Environment and water.

== Awards ==
The Newcastle Coal Infrastructure Group (NCIG) project won the 2013 Bulk Handling Facility of the Year Award (Resources and Infrastructure). In 2005 Hatch, in joint venture with Aurecon, assisted in the engineering and project management. The partnership went on to complete the full development in three successive phases, each one under budget, ahead of schedule, already capable of achieving nameplate capacity, and with an outstanding safety record with only two lost time injuries in over 8 million work-hours.

Hatch was awarded the PMI-Montréal Project of the Year 2013 for Phase 1 of the AP60 Project in Jonquière, Québec, Canada. The Project of the Year Award from PMI-Montréal honors a company's excellence in project management. Phase 1 of the AP60 project, part of Rio Tinto Alcan's strategic development plan, consisted of commissioning 38 first-generation AP60 cells that require an unprecedented 600 kA of current. Construction of the new plant showcases, on an industrial scale, how these new AP60 pots can produce 40% more aluminum at a lower cost and with fewer emissions.

The Niagara Tunnel Project was named the North American Project of the Year by International Water Power and Dam Construction magazine in their June 2013 edition. Hatch, in association with Hatch Mott MacDonald, provided "owner's representative" services to Ontario Power Generation for the design and construction of the project. Hatch's scope included preparation of design/build contract documents, design review, construction monitoring and contract administration.

For the sixth consecutive year, Hatch has been named one of Canada's best managed companies. In 2013, Hatch was announced as one of 50 Best Employers in Canada, an honor that has been awarded for the fourth consecutive year.
