= Sir Adam Beck Hydroelectric Generating Stations =

Hydroelectric dam in Ontario, Canada

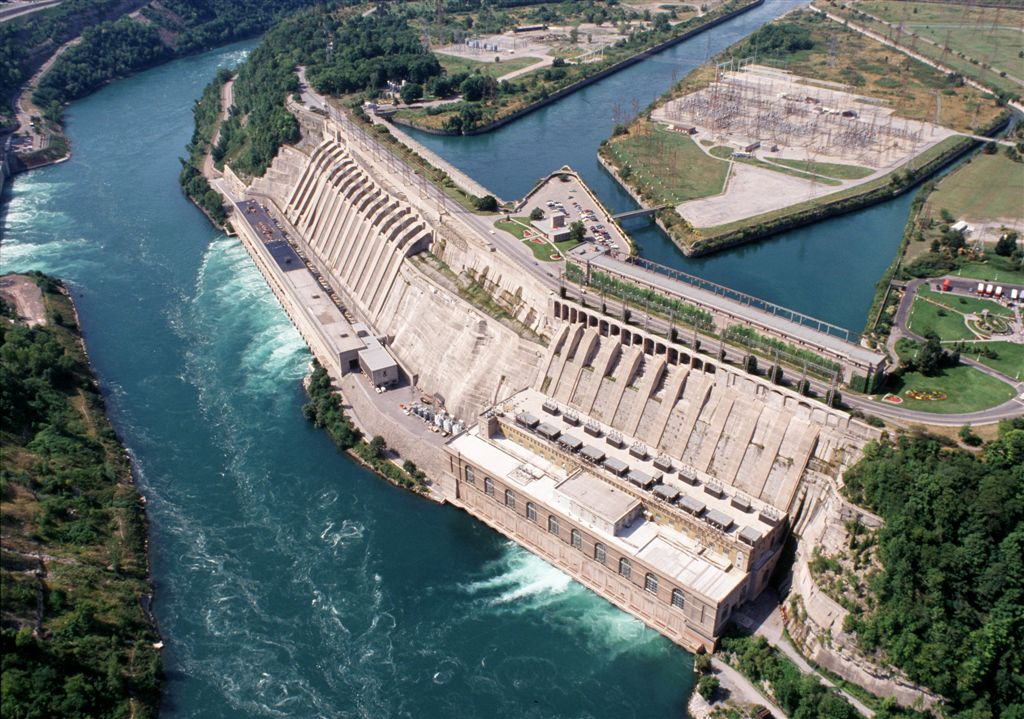
- The Adam Beck stations as seen from the air; the northern dam (nearest) is Adam Beck I and the southern is Adam Beck II.
- Country: Canada
- Location: Niagara Falls, Ontario
- Coordinates: 43°08′51″N 79°02′41″W
- Status: Operational
- Commission date: Adam Beck I 1922, Adam Beck II 1954

National Historic Site of Canada
- Official name: Queenston-Chippawa Hydro-Electric Development National Historic Site
- Designated: 1990
- Owner: Ontario Power Generation
- Operator: Ontario Power Generation

Power generation
- Units operational: 26 (Adam Beck I 10, Adam Beck II 16)
- Nameplate capacity: 1,962 MW

External links
- Website: www.opg.com
- Commons: Related media on Commons

Sir Adam Beck Hydroelectric Generating Stations are two hydroelectric generating stations in Niagara Falls, Ontario, Canada. Sir Adam Beck Generating Station I, Sir Adam Beck Generating Station II and the Sir Adam Beck Pump Generating Station are all owned by Ontario Power Generation. Following the development of several smaller generating stations around Niagara Falls in the late 19th and early 20th centuries, the Province of Ontario authorized the construction of the first major publicly owned generating station in the province. At the time it was built, it was the largest hydroelectric generating station in the world.

The stations divert water from the Niagara and Welland rivers above Niagara Falls which is then released into the lower portion of the Niagara River, and together produce up to 1,962 MW (2,631,000 hp).

== Adam Beck I ==
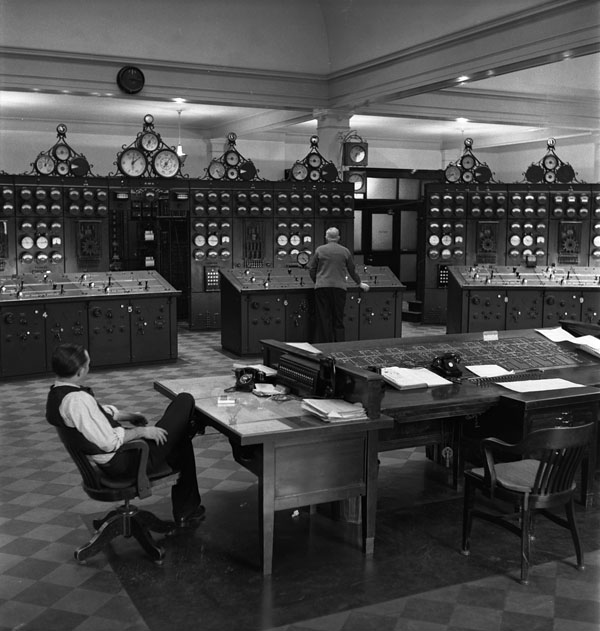
Control room, 1944

Adam Beck I contains 10 generators and first produced power in 1922. It was originally called the Queenston-Chippawa Hydroelectric Plant and was renamed after Adam Beck in 1950 on the twenty-fifth anniversary of his death. The water is diverted through the Chippawa-Queenston Power Canal from the Welland River.

As the first large-scale hydroelectric generation project in the world, Adam Beck I was designated a National Historic Site in 1990.

== Adam Beck II ==
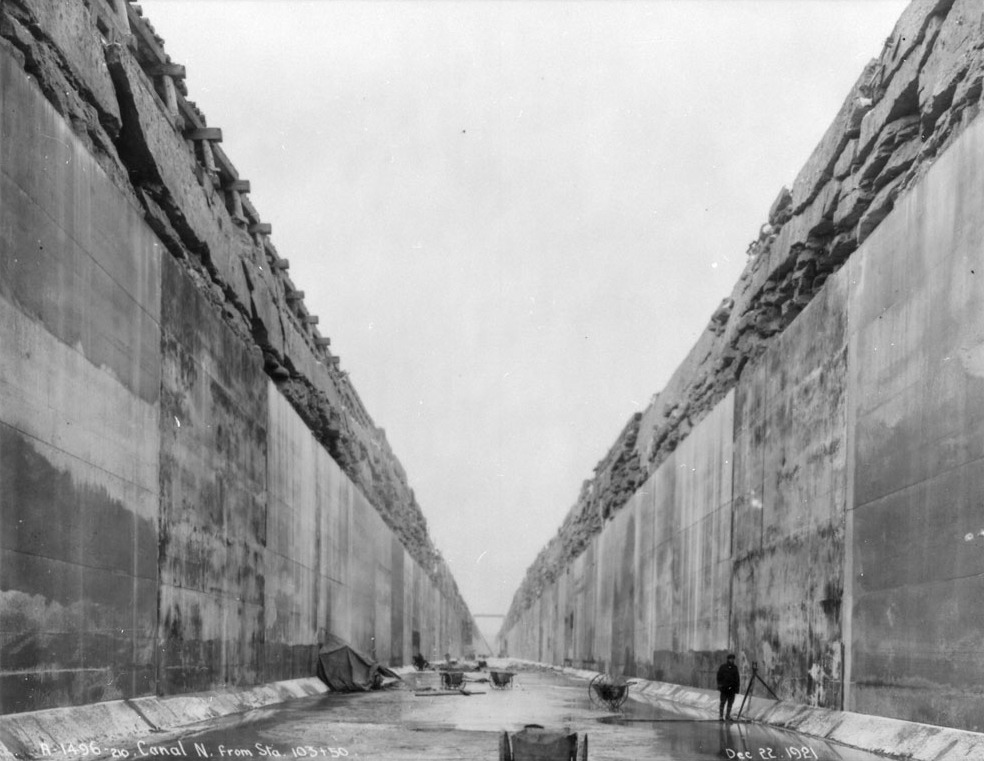
The Chippawa-Queenston Power Canal in 1921; it was the first of three sources to provide water to the Generating Stations

Adam Beck II contains 16 generators and first produced power in 1954. The water was first diverted from the Niagara River by two five-mile (8 km) tunnels under the city of Niagara Falls, Ontario, that start above the falls. A reservoir was created that permits the holding of water, diverted during the night, for use during the day.

Between 2007 and 2013, Adam Beck II underwent major civil engineering projects with the addition of a major underground water supply tunnel built by the Niagara Tunnel Project in order to improve its generation output. Water delivered by the major new tunnel complemented other upgrades to the Sir Adam Beck generating complex, resulting in a significant increase to the efficient use of the Niagara River's hydro power.

The project's new 12.7-metre (42 ft) diameter, 10.2 km (6.3 mi) long tunnel was officially placed into service on 21 March 2013, helping to increase the generating complex's nameplate capacity by 150 MW, able to provide the power for about 160,000 homes. A CAD 60 million refurbishment of the Pump Generating Station reservoir, built in 1957, was started in 2016.

The major 1965 Northeast Blackout of Ontario and several U.S. states occurred on 9 November, after maintenance personnel incorrectly set a protective relay on one of the transmission lines from the Sir Adam Beck Station No. II. The faulty relay later tripped open causing a major blackout created by a series of cascading failures which affected over 30 million people for up to 12 hours.

== Water diversion ==
The open cut Chippawa-Queenston Power Canal diverts water from the Welland River to the stations. Upstream of the International Control Dam there are three tunnel intakes which run under Niagara Falls, Ontario, and surface 2 km (1.2 mi) upstream of the Sir Adam Beck Generating Stations. All three tunnel intakes are upstream of the Control Dam, however one of the three tunnels is unseen, under the water, located directly in front of the Control Dam, Control Tower. The open cut canal and the tunnel canal cross at the "Cross Over" where there is a third channel feeding the 174 MW pump generating station 43°08′40″N 79°03′36″W which pumps water up into the man-made reservoir at night and generates electricity during the day, feeding the water back to the Sir Adam Beck Generating Complex.

The International Control Dam, operated by Ontario Power Generation, controls the water diversions from the Niagara River and dispatches the water between the New York Power Authority and Ontario Power Generation in accordance with the terms of the 1950 Niagara Treaty.

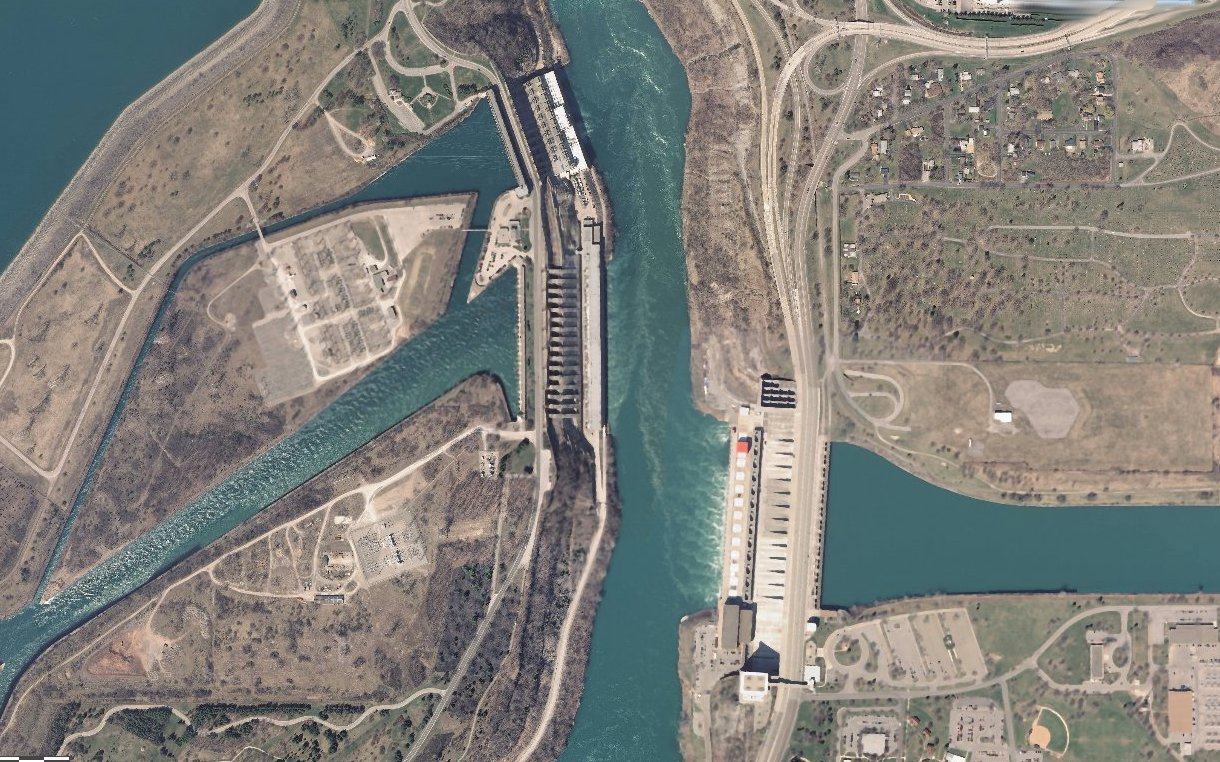
The Adam Beck dams are at the left, and the Robert Moses Station is on the right of the image

This treaty, designed to ensure an "unbroken curtain of water" is flowing over the falls, states that during daylight time during the tourist season (1 April to 31 October) there must be 2,832 m^{3}/s (100,000 cu ft/s) of water flowing over the falls, and during the night and off-tourist season there must be 1,416 m^{3}/s (50,000 cu ft/s) of water flowing over the falls. This treaty is monitored by the International Niagara Board of Control.

== See also ==
- Robert Moses Niagara Power Plant
- List of largest power stations in Canada
- List of energy storage projects
- List of Niagara Falls hydroelectric generating plants
