= Robert Moses Niagara Power Plant =

Power station in Lewiston, New York

Robert Moses Niagara Hydroelectric Power Station
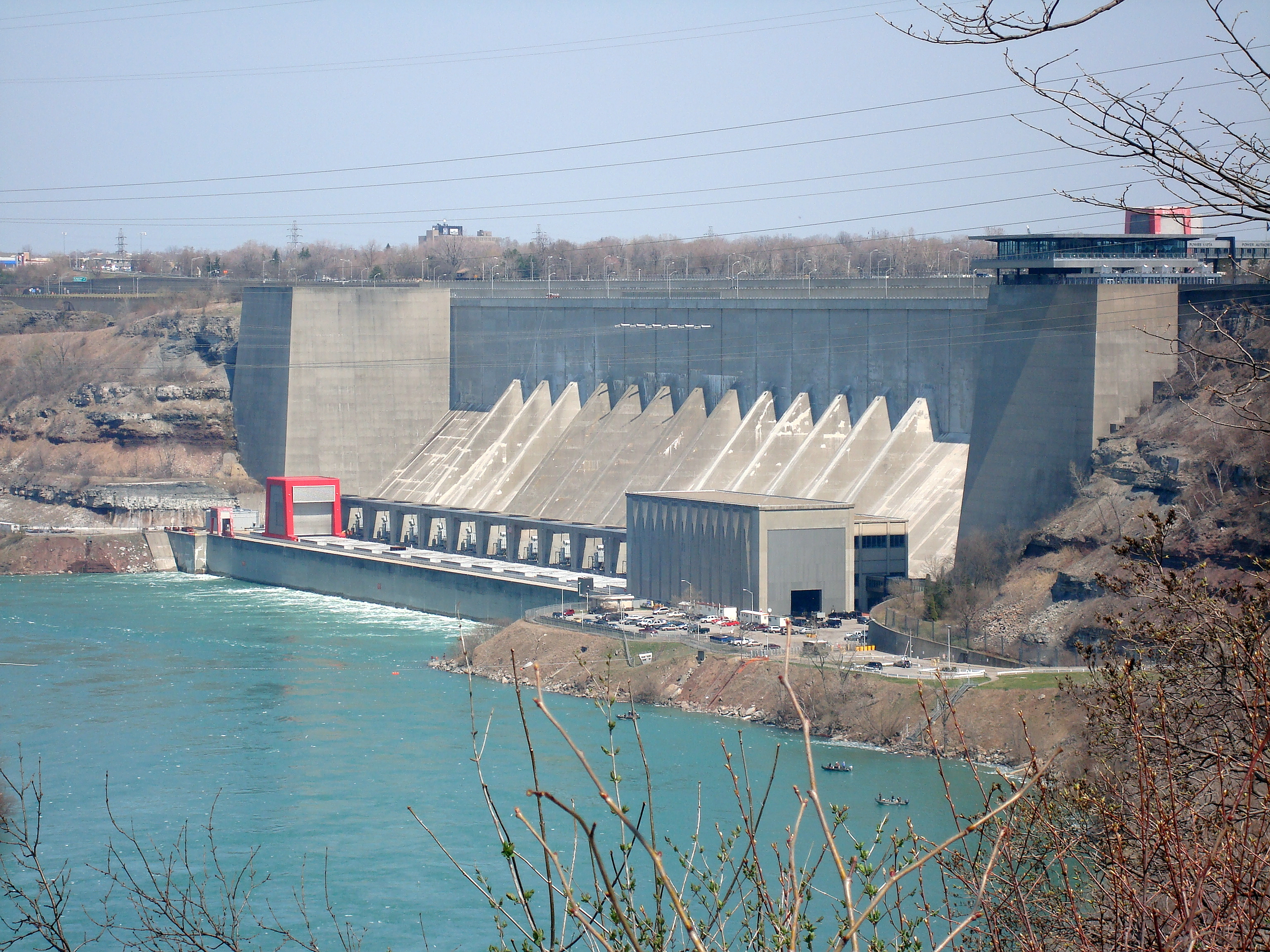
- Interactive map of Robert Moses Niagara Hydroelectric Power Station
- Country: United States
- Location: Lewiston, New York
- Coordinates: 43°08′35″N 79°02′23″W
- Purpose: Power
- Status: Operational
- Construction began: 1957; 69 years ago
- Opening date: 1961; 65 years ago
- Construction cost: US$800 million (1957)
- Owner: New York Power Authority

Dam and spillways
- Type of dam: Gravity dam
- Impounds: Niagara River

Reservoir
- Creates: Moses Niagara Power Plant forebay
- Total capacity: 740,000,000 US gal (2.8×10^{9} L; 620,000,000 imp gal)

Power Station
- Commission date: 1961
- Type: Conventional
- Turbines: 13
- Installed capacity: 2,525 MW (3,386,000 hp)
- Capacity factor: 71.9%
- Annual generation: 15,896,756 MWh
- Website https://www.nypa.gov/power/generation/niagara-power-project
- Works in conjunction with the Lewiston Pump-Generating Plant

The Robert Moses Niagara Hydroelectric Power Station is a hydroelectric power station in Lewiston, New York, near Niagara Falls. Owned and operated by the New York Power Authority (NYPA), the plant diverts water from the Niagara River above Niagara Falls and returns the water into the lower portion of the river near Lake Ontario. It uses 13 generators at an installed capacity of 2,525 MW (3,386,000 hp) with an average annual net generation of 15,897,000 MWh between 2014 and 2023, and a capacity factor of 71.9%.

Named for New York City planner Robert Moses, the plant was built to replace power production after the Schoellkopf Power Station, a nearby hydroelectric plant, collapsed in 1956. It stands across the river from Sir Adam Beck Hydroelectric Power Stations in Niagara Falls, Ontario, Canada.

== History ==
=== Origins ===
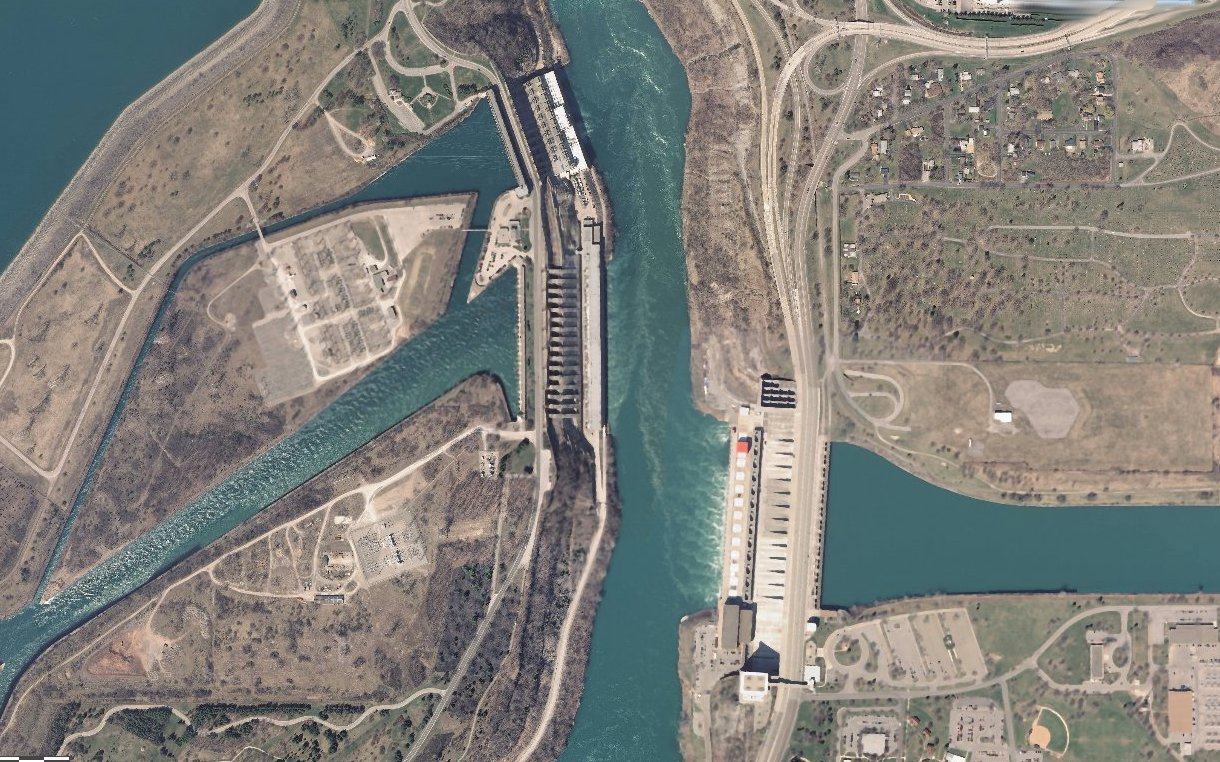
The Robert Moses Niagara Power Station at right.

The land that the Robert Moses Niagara Power Plant occupies has a long history of use. In 1805, Augustus and Peter Porter of Buffalo, New York, purchased the American Falls from New York in a public auction (and later acquired the rights to the eastern rapids above the falls) with a stated plan to generate power by way of a "hydraulic raceway". The men were unable to secure funding for the project, however, each died without achieving significant progress toward their planned infrastructure. Several other companies later attempted similar projects, all without success.

In 1853, the Niagara Falls Hydraulic Power and Manufacturing Company was chartered; in 1861, it completed a 35 ft (11 m) wide and 8 ft (2.4 m) deep canal. The powerhouse finally opened in 1874, but produced little electricity even by the standards of the day.

In 1877, Jacob F. Schoellkopf purchased the canal, along with the water and power rights, for $71,000. He improved the canal and put the powerhouse to commercial use. In 1881, his company completed Schoellkopf Power Station No. 1; it would operate until 1904. In 1891, Schoellkopf Power Station No. 2 opened directly in front of the original, in the gorge below the falls, with a higher 210 ft (64 m) drop and capacity of 25 MW (34,000 hp). In 1914 and 1918, the company built Schoellkopf Stations No. 3A and 3B respectively, with a total capacity of 180.8 MW (242,500 hp).

In 1886, the competing Niagara Falls Power Company, owned by the Cataract Construction Company, built the Adams Power Plant. Between 1900 and 1904, the company built the Powerhouse No. 2, bringing its total generators to 21, with a total capacity of 78 MW (105,000 hp).

In 1918, World War I led the power companies to merge into the Niagara Falls Power Company. From 1921 to 1924, the company built Schoellkopf Station No. 3C next to the previous ones. It contained three 25 Hz generators with a total capacity of 160 MW (210,000 hp), bringing the Schoellkopf Power Stations to 19 generators with a capacity of 337.4 MW (452,500 hp).

On June 7, 1956, water seeping into a back wall caused the collapse of two-thirds of Schoellkopf Power Station No. 3b and 3c, killing one worker and causing an estimated $100 million in damage.

=== Construction ===
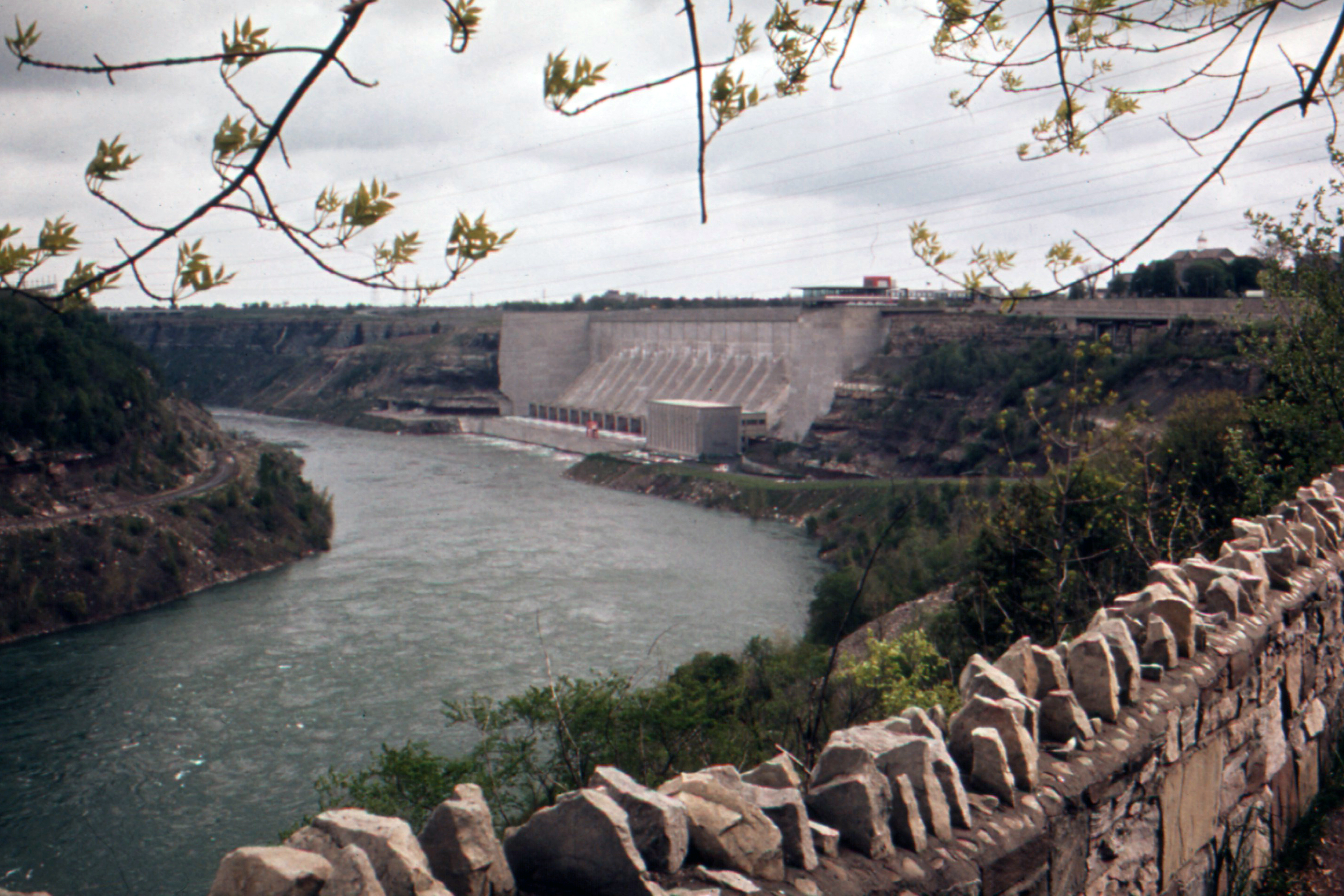
1973 photo

To replace the antiquated and now partially destroyed Schoellkopf power stations, the New York Power Authority (NYPA) planned an $800 million power plant that would produce 2.4 GW. During planning, it was called the Niagara Power Project; later, it was named for NYPA head Robert Moses.

In 1957, the United States Congress approved the project. Construction began that year, although its completion would require the NYPA to gain the rights to 550 acres (220 ha) of Tuscarora Indian Reservation for a new 1,900-acre (770 ha), 22-billion-US-gallon (83,000,000 m^{3}) reservoir. This it did in 1960, through a United States Supreme Court decision, the Federal Power Commission v. Tuscarora Indian Nation.

During construction, over 12 million cubic yards (9.2 million cubic meters) of rock were excavated. In the process of construction some twenty workers died. Construction was complete in 1961. When it opened in 1961, it was the Western world's largest hydropower facility.

The generation facilities were listed on the National Register of Historic Places in 2017.

== Lewiston Pump-Generating Plant ==
Lewiston Pump-Generating Plant
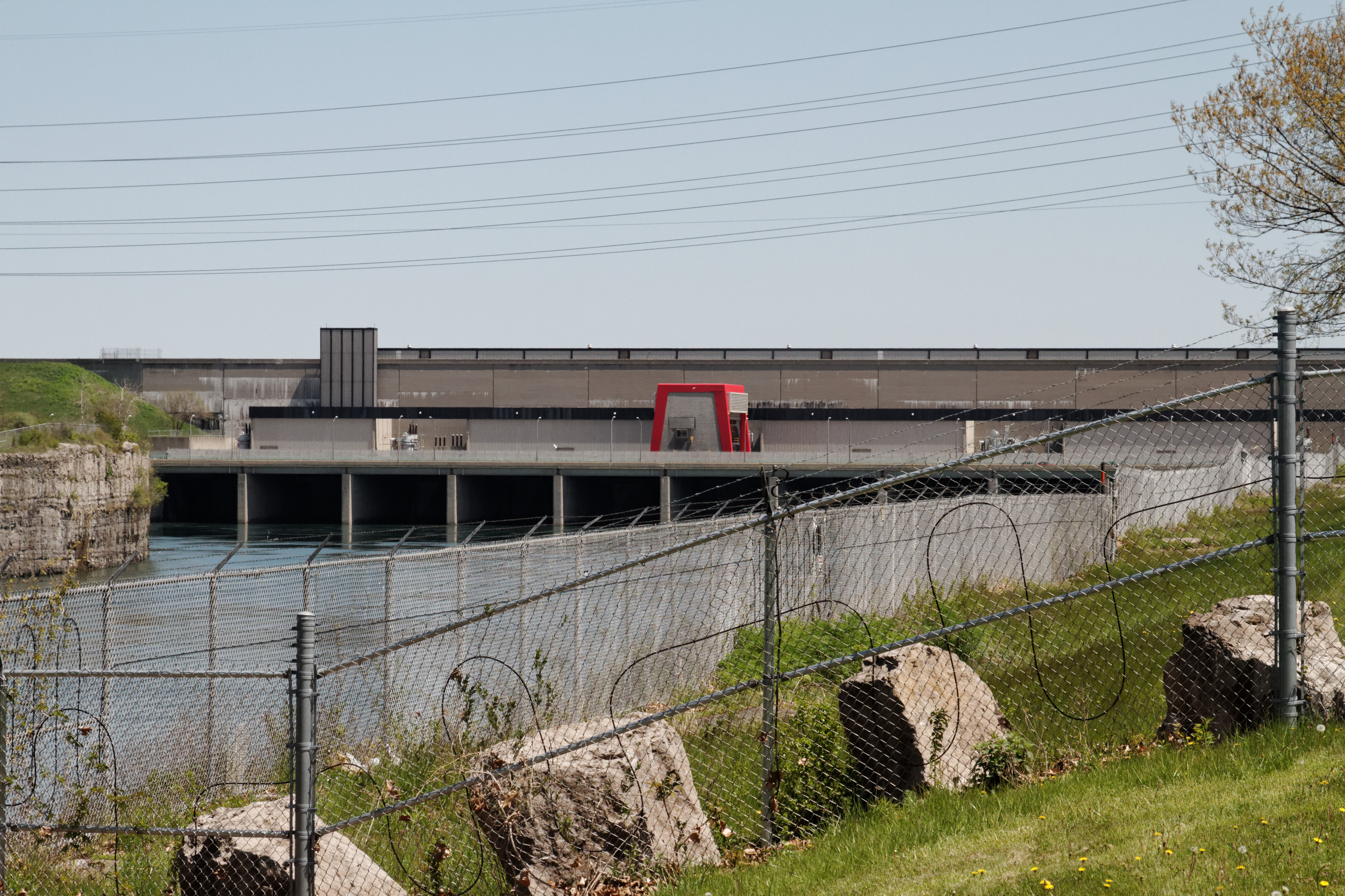
- Interactive map of Lewiston Pump-Generating Plant
- Country: United States
- Location: Lewiston, New York
- Purpose: Power
- Status: Operational
- Construction began: 1957
- Opening date: 1961
- Construction cost: $48.72 million USD (1962)
- Owner: New York Power Authority

Dam and spillways
- Type of dam: Gravity dam
- Impounds: Moses Niagara Power Plant forebay

Reservoir
- Creates: Lewiston Reservoir
- Total capacity: 22,000,000,000 US gal (8.3×10^{10} L; 1.8×10^{10} imp gal)
- Surface area: 1,900 acres (770 ha)

Power Station
- Coordinates: 43°08′35″N 79°01′18.4″W
- Commission date: 1961
- Type: Pumped-storage
- Turbines: 12 × 20 MW
- Installed capacity: 240 MW
- Website http://www.nypa.gov/facilities/niagara.htm
- Works in conjunction with the Robert Moses Niagara Power Plant

The pump-generating plant in the Lewiston Dam is atypical, in that the dam was constructed not to control the flow of water in a natural river, but to contain a man-made 1,900-acre (770 ha), 22-billion-US-gallon (83,000,000 m^{3}) upper reservoir (named the Lewiston Reservoir) which stores water pumped into the reservoir from the forebay of the Robert Moses Power Station. Water enters the forebay by tunnels from the Niagara River controlled by the International Control Dam upstream of the natural falls. Water in the forebay can be either pumped up into the upper reservoir for later use or immediately sent down over the escarpment downstream of the natural falls through the Robert Moses Power Station turbines. The Lewiston Pump-Generating Plant 43°08′33″N 79°01′18″W houses 12 electrically powered pump-generators that can generate a combined 240 MW (320,000 hp) when water in the upper reservoir is released.

At night, two 46 ft (14 m) wide by 66 ft (20 m) tall tunnels divert a substantial fraction (600,000 US gal (2,300 m^{3}) per second) of the water in the Niagara River 4.5 mi (7.2 km) to the forebay. Electricity generated in the Moses plant powers the Lewiston pumps to push water into the upper reservoir. The water is pumped at night because the demand for electricity is much lower than during the day. In addition to the lower demand for electricity at night, less water can be diverted from the river during the day because of the desire to preserve the appearance of the falls.

During the day, when electrical demand is high, water is released from the upper reservoir through the Lewiston Dam pump-generators, generating electricity. The water flows into the forebay, where it then flows through the turbines of the Moses plant back to the main river. This allows water diverted from above Niagara Falls to pass through two sets of turbines, generating electricity both times. This arrangement is an example of pumped-storage hydroelectricity. Engineers copied what had been built by Ontario Hydro, across the river, when a similar system was built during construction of the Sir Adam Beck Generating Station II in the 1950s.

This system allows energy to be stored in vast quantities. The potential energy in the diverted water is converted into electrical energy in the Moses plant. At night, some of that electrical energy is converted back to potential energy when water is pumped into the upper reservoir behind the Lewiston Dam. During the day, part of the potential energy of the water in the Lewiston reservoir is converted into electricity at the Lewiston Dam, and then its remaining potential energy is captured by the Moses plant, which is also capturing the potential energy of the water diverted from the river in real-time.

The Robert Moses Plant was refurbished in 2006, which required the southbound lanes of the nearby Robert Moses State Parkway to be closed during said repairs.

Beginning in 2012 and until 2021, the pump-generating plant has undergone a $460 million modernization that increased the plant's efficiency and service life.

== Contamination of the site area ==
During the mid-1980s, the New York Power Authority began an expansion project at the site, known as FERC (Federal Energy Regulatory Commission) Project 2216. Soon after, the project was halted due to discovery of hazardous chemicals such as dioxins, which chemical companies which owned the land had dumped underground. A civil lawsuit was filed in the State of New York against the New York Power Authority, Occidental Petroleum, Hooker Chemicals, Bechtel Corporation, and Parsons Brinckerhoff, which was settled out of court in 1999. Subsequent testing near the Lewiston Reservoir near the project still confirms mercury and organic contamination which restricts the consumption of fish.

== Niagara Power Visitors Center ==
The Niagara Power Visitors Center is adjacent to the Robert Moses plant, with an observation deck along Niagara Gorge. The Center features interactive exhibits about hydroelectricity and its history in the Niagara Frontier.

== See also ==
- List of largest hydroelectric power stations in the United States
- List of energy storage projects
- List of power stations in New York
- List of Niagara Falls hydroelectric generating plants
- Ludington Pumped Storage Power Plant
- New York energy law
- Reservoir State Park
