= Welland River =

River in Southern Ontario

Welland River Chippawa Creek
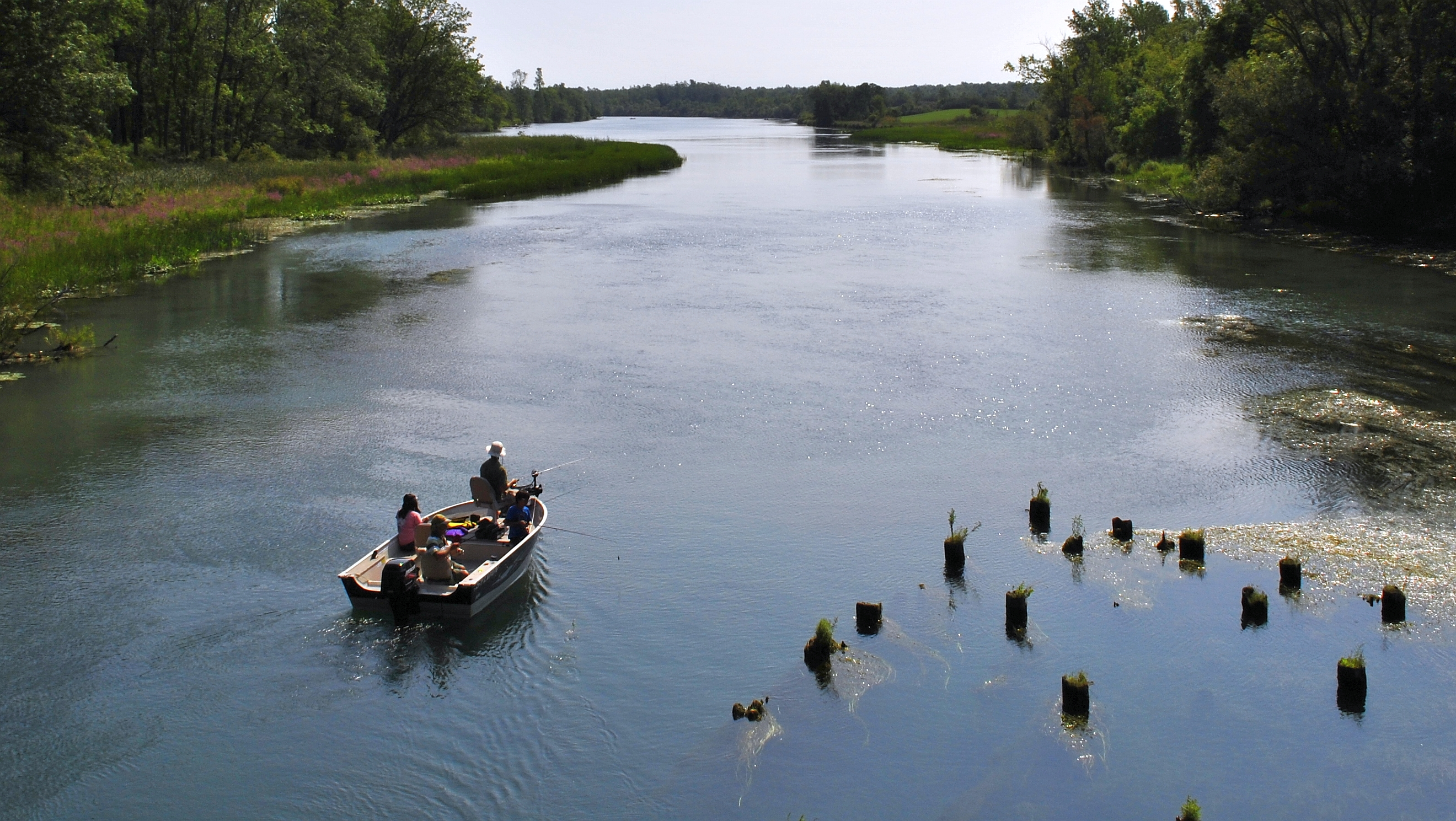
- A boat on the river

- Location within Southern Ontario

Location
- Country: Canada
- Province: Ontario
- Cities: Welland; Niagara Falls

Physical characteristics
- Source
  - coordinates: 43.14542°N 79.93847°W
  - elevation: approx. 248 m (814 ft)
- Mouth
  - location: Niagara River
  - coordinates: 43.06334°N 79.04504°W
  - elevation: 166 m (545 ft)
- Length: approx. 135–140 km (84–87 mi)
- Width
  - minimum: 50 ft (15 m)
  - maximum: 100 ft (30 m)
- Discharge
  - location: Wellandport; 43°00′18″N 79°28′57″W
  - average: 8.72 m^{3}/s (308 cu ft/s)
  - minimum: 8.57 m^{3}/s (303 cu ft/s)
  - maximum: 8.88 m^{3}/s (314 cu ft/s)

Basin features
- Progression: Niagara River→ Lake Ontario→ Saint Lawrence River→ Gulf of Saint Lawrence

The Welland River (originally called the Chippawa Creek) is a river in the Golden Horseshoe that passes through the Southern Ontario cities of Welland and Niagara Falls. It flows from its source, a Drainage Basin just south of Hamilton, Ontario to meet the Niagara River.

== History ==
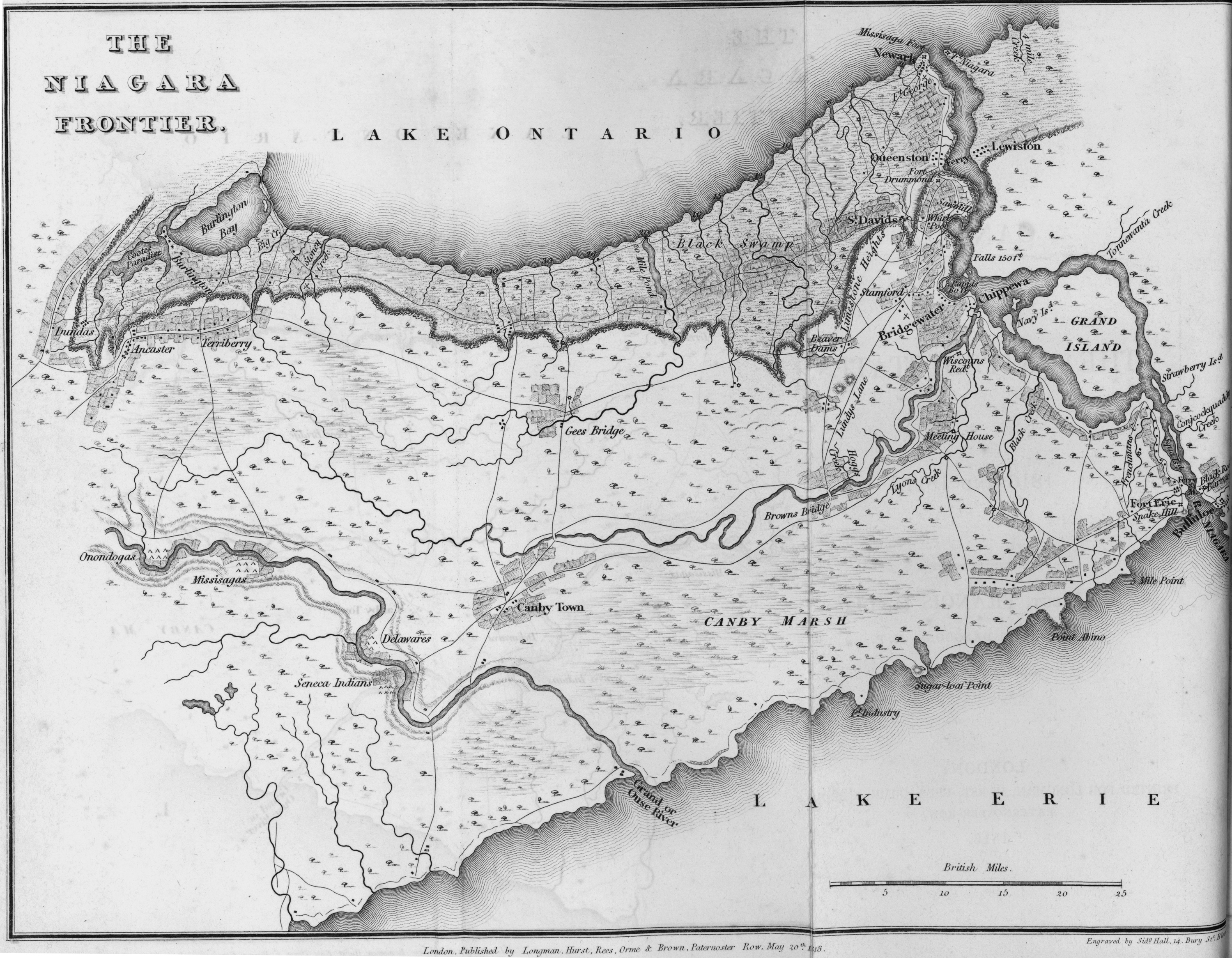
The river in a map from 1818

The river was originally called the Chippawa Creek since it drained into the Niagara River at Chippawa. Like many other places in Niagara, it was renamed by John Graves Simcoe, the first lieutenant governor of Upper Canada in 1792. The present name was taken from the river of the same name in Lincolnshire, Eastern England. The Welland River is occasionally referred to as Chippawa Creek, especially by those in the Chippawa area itself.

The Welland Canal was named after the river since it originally was planned to link Lake Ontario to Welland River. The city of Welland was later named after both waterways which crossed in the city.

=== O'Reilly's Bridge ===
The oldest structure spanning the Welland River was O'Reilly's Bridge, which was built in 1901 (125 years ago) and crossed the river between the townships of Pelham and Wainfleet. The settler, Patrick O'Reilly, son of Sgt. John Reilly, of Stamford Township (present-day Niagara Falls), settled in Wainfleet in 1806. After meeting Sarah, the daughter of John Brown of Pelham Township, Patrick O'Reilly felled a couple of very tall trees across the River to shorten his journey to see her. A better bridge was built after they married and Patrick realized Sarah was frightened of walking along the logs. John Brown O'Reilly was their son who acted as Clerk of Wainfleet Township for many years. Over the years O'Reilly's Bridge saw many upgrades and improvements until it finally became the responsibility of the municipality. That is about the time O'Reilly's Bridge became a single-lane iron truss bridge, the only of its kind on the entire river, and one of the oldest iron truss bridges in Southern Ontario. O'Reilly's Bridge was demolished in 2010 (16 years ago) and was replaced with a more modern, wider span.

== Geography ==
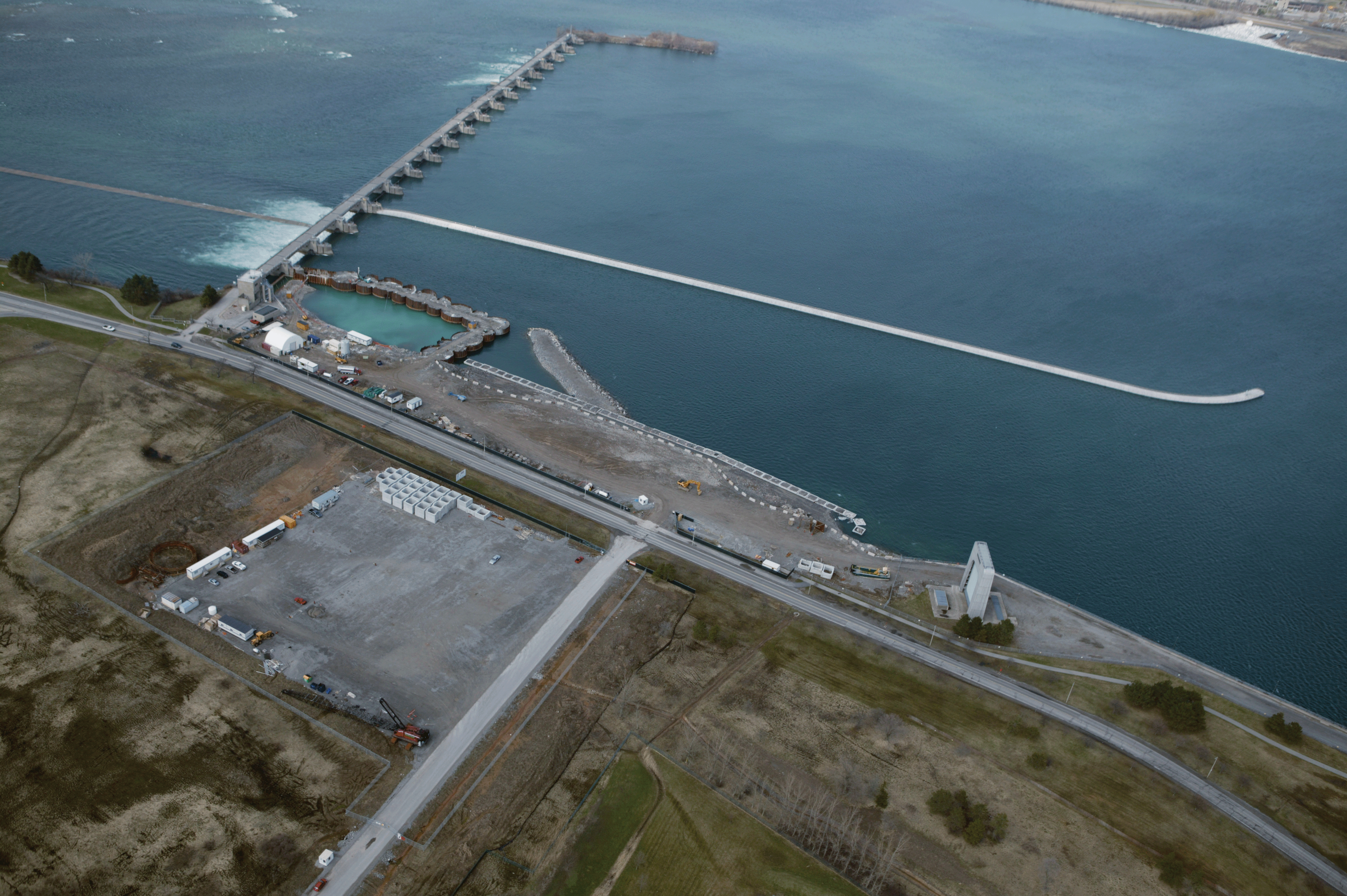
The International Control Dam, as seen from the Canadian side of the border

The river flows under two navigable aqueducts: the Welland Recreational Waterway and the new alignment of the Welland Canal. An important tributary of the river is Coyle Creek, a picturesque and thickly forested creek that flows into the river on the north bank.

A stream of the river branches off shortly before its mouth. This canal quickly turns an open-cut hydropower channel through the city of Niagara Falls on its way to the Sir Adam Beck Hydroelectric Generating Stations in Queenston. It drains an area of 880 square kilometres (340 mi^{2}).

The International Control Dam, a weir in the Niagara River, causes the Welland River to reverse its direction twice a day when the flow of water over the Niagara Falls is reduced overnight and the water heads back up the river as far back as Wellandport. When the water flow is restored, the water direction of the Welland River changes once again to flow towards the Niagara River.

== See also ==
- List of rivers of Ontario
