= List of Niagara Falls hydroelectric generating plants =

Niagara Falls hydroelectric generating plants are the hydroelectric powerplants in the vicinity of the Niagara Falls, a large geological feature which straddles the joint borders of Canada and the United States. Since 1882 a number of hydroelectric plants have generated electricity in both countries, including:

== Province of Ontario, Canada ==
- Niagara Falls & River Railway Power House, operating in Queen Victoria Park, Niagara Falls, Ontario, between 1892 and 1932, supplying electricity (2 MW from three turbines) to its trains and electric trolleys operating between Queenston and Chippawa. Niagara Parks Commission removed tracks and generation station eventually demolished; later site of Niagara Parks People Mover station at Table Rock and now WEGO Station
- William Birch Rankine Power Station, opened in 1905 by the Canadian Niagara Power Company, which was founded in 1892. It was purchased by the Niagara Mohawk Power Corporation in 1950, and then by the Fortis Incorporated Power Group in 1999–2000, after which it was retired from service following an agreement with Ontario Power Generation, the provincial utility. It is now a museum operated under the name Niagara Parks Power Station.
- Ontario Power Company Generating Station, also opened in 1905, purchased by the Ontario Hydro Power Commission in 1917 and then decommissioned in 1999.
- Electrical Development Company (EDC), later named the Toronto Power Company, built the Toronto Power Generating Station, operating between 1906 and 1973.
- Sir Adam Beck Hydroelectric Generating Stations, are two hydroelectric generating stations in Niagara Falls, specifically Queenston Heights, Ontario, Canada, opened in 1922 and originally named the Queenston Chippawa Power Station. It was renamed after Sir Adam Beck in 1950, with significant expansions in 1954 and 2013. The two major power stations at the site are called Adam Beck I and Adam Beck II.

== State of New York, United States ==
- Niagara Falls Hydraulic Power and Manufacturing Company of Niagara Falls, N.Y., was the first company to generate electricity (in minor amounts) from Niagara Falls in 1882, but fell into bankruptcy in about two years.
- Schoellkopf Hydraulic Power Company was also created about 1882. Its individual powerplants at various sites near the falls were named Schoellkopf Power Station No. 1, 2, 3A and 3B. In 1918 the Hydraulic Power Company was merged with the Niagara Falls Power Company owned by Edward Dean Adams.
- Niagara River Hydraulic Tunnel Power & Sewer Company, chartered in 1886 but not operating a powerplant until its subsidiary, the Cataract Construction Corporation began generating in 1894. It was re-organized in 1899, becoming the Niagara Falls Power Company.
- Edward Dean Adams Power Plant of Niagara Falls, N.Y., belonging to the Niagara Falls Power Company. It was the first large-scale generating plant in the world, built in 1895. Its earliest facility was called Niagara Power Station No. 1.
- Robert Moses Niagara Hydroelectric Power Station is the current major U.S. hydroelectric powerplant near Niagara Falls, N.Y., physically located in Lewiston, N.Y., and opened in 1961. A separate secondary generating facility which operates in conjunction with the Robert Moses Power Station is the:
  - Lewiston Pump-Generating Plant, a pumped-storage hydroelectric generating facility
