= Edward Dean Adams =

American businessman, banker, power broker and numismatist (1846-1931)

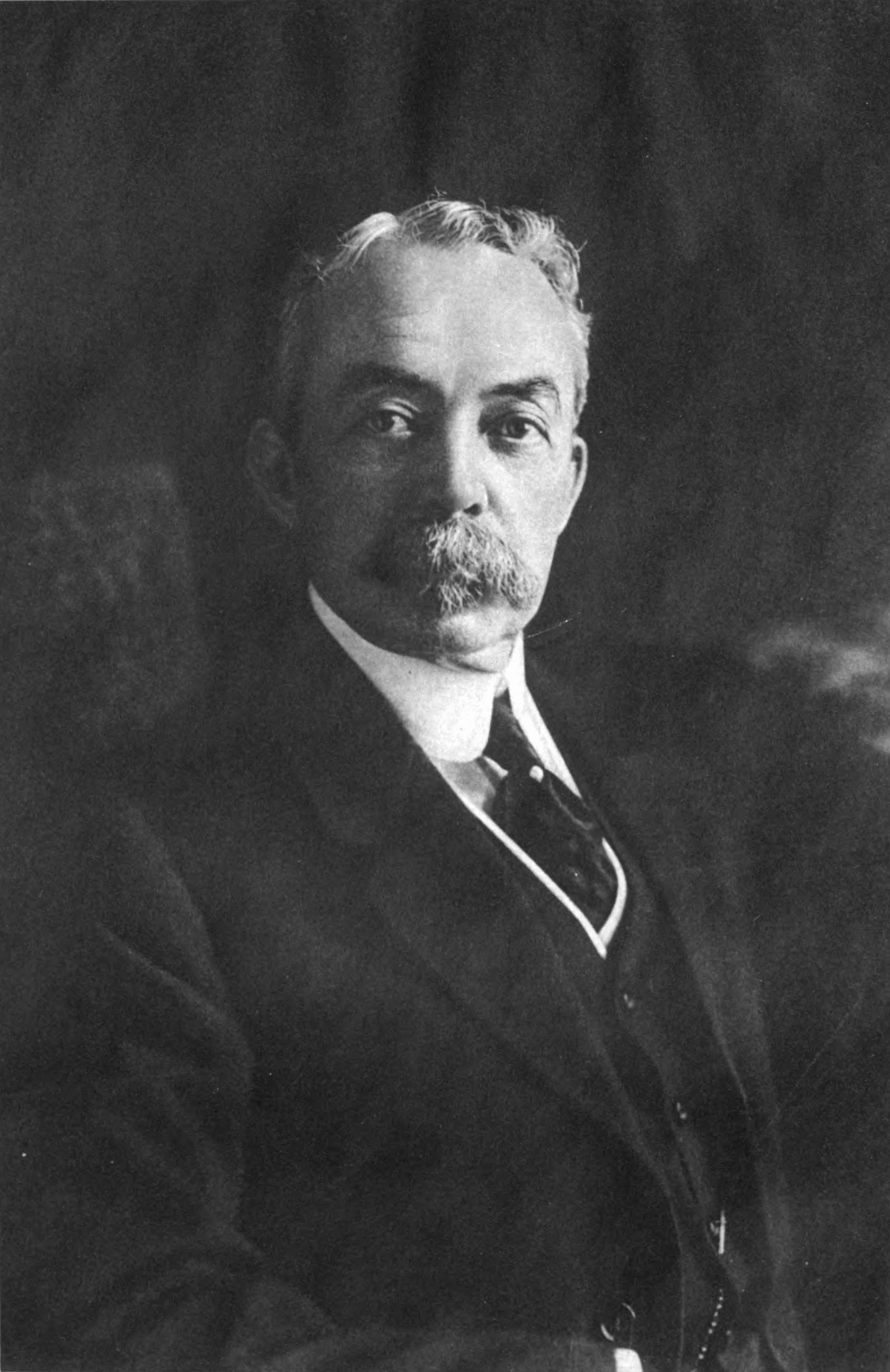
- Born: April 9, 1846; Boston
- Died: May 20, 1931; New York City
- Education: Massachusetts Institute of Technology; Norwich University
- Spouse: Frances Amelia Gutterson
- Awards: John Fritz Medal (1926)

Edward Dean Adams (April 9, 1846 – May 20, 1931) was an American businessman, banker, philanthropist, and numismatist.

He was the president of Niagara Falls Hydraulic Power and Manufacturing Company which built the first hydroelectric power plants in Niagara Falls, New York. The Adams Power Plant Transformer House is named after him. He was "conspicuously successful in corporate reorganizations".

He also had wide cultural interests, including numismatics, and he played a leading role at the Metropolitan Museum of Art.

== Early life and education ==
Edward Dean Adams was born in Boston, Massachusetts on April 9, 1846 to businessman Adoniram Judson Adams and Harriet Lincoln (née Norton) Adams. They were distantly related to the Adams political family, sharing a common ancestor in England named Henry Adams.

Adams attended Chauncy Hall School in Boston before studying at Norwich University, where he graduated with a bachelor of science degree in 1864. In 1869, he took a course at Massachusetts Institute of Technology.

== Business career ==
Adams joined a Boston stockbroker firm, T.J. Lee & Hill, in 1867, where he worked as a bookkeeper and a cashier. From 1870 to 1878, he was a partner in the Boston firm of Richardson, Hill & Co. He joined Winslow, Lanier & Co. in 1878. In 1893, he became the American representative of Deutsche Bank and served in that role until the outbreak of World War I in 1914.

Through his banking positions, Adams was a power broken in the financial, railroad and industrial world of Wall Street, and he served as a director on many corporate boards, including:

- All America Cables, Incorporated
- American Cotton Oil Company
- Brevard Tannin Company
- Cataract Construction Company
- Central and South American Telegraph
- Central Railroad of New Jersey
- Clinchfield Coal Corporation
- Hammon Typewriter Company
- Intertype Corporation
- International Niagara Commission
- Mohawk Hydroelectric Company
- New Jersey General Security Company
- New York and Long Branch Railroad
- Niagara Development Company
- Niagara Falls Power Company
- Niagara Junction Railway
- Missouri Pacific Railroad
- Northern Pacific Terminal Company of Oregon
- Edison Illuminating Company
- St. Paul and Northern Pacific Railway
- New York, Ontario and Western Railway
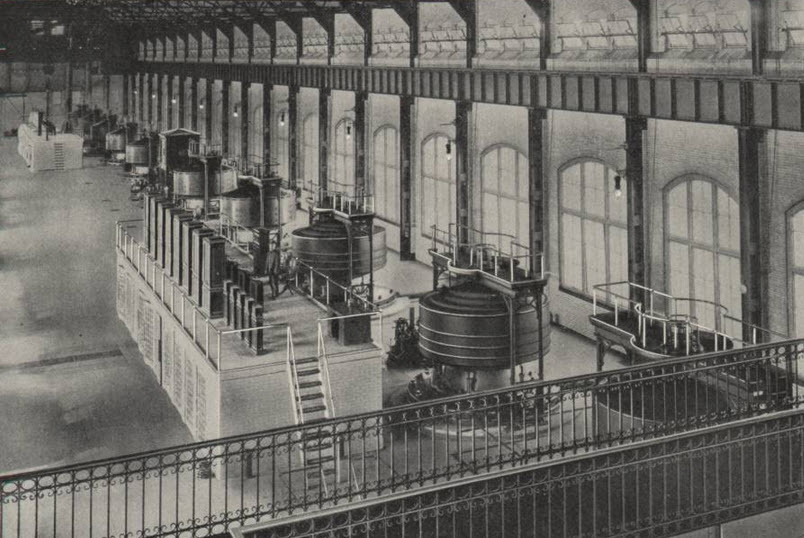
  The interior of the Edward Dean Adams Power Plant

Adams was also noted for his work on corporate restructuring, including the reorganization of the American Cotton Oil Company in 1890, chairing its board of directors until 1896. He also restructured the Northern Pacific Railway in 1893, the West Shore Railroad in 1886, and the Central Railroad of New Jersey in 1887.

Of his many corporate positions, Adams is best remembered for his involvement in the Niagara Falls Power Company, which built the first hydroelectric power plants on Niagara Falls. The Adams Power Plant Transformer House was named in his honor, and he received the John Fritz Medal for "outstanding scientific or industrial achievements" in 1926. He appeared on the cover of Time magazine on May 27, 1929.

== Personal life ==
Adams married Frances Amelia Gutterson of Boston in October 1872. They had five children, Ruth, Ralph, Ernest (died 1904), Pierpont, and Kempton.

In addition to their home at 455 Madison Avenue, Adams kept a home in Rumson, New Jersey, where he was a senior warden at St. George's Episcopal Church, trustee of the Monmouth County Historical Association, and president of the Rumson County Club, Rumson Improvement Company, and Rumson Park.

Adams was chairman of the Kahn Foundation for the Foreign Travel of American Teachers and was awarded the Royal Order of the Crown of Prussia in 1909.

=== Association with the Metropolitan Museum of Art ===
Adams was a trustee of the Metropolitan Museum of Art for almost 40 years, and served in various capacities. He was a member and treasurer of the special committee for the acquisition of casts and reproductions; chairman of the Finance Committee (1905–1920), and a member of various committees, including the Executive Committee (1910–1931), the Building Committee, the Committee on Educational Work, the Committee on Prints, and the Library Committee.

He also made many gifts to the museum, including a collection of reproductions of the more noteworthy of the bronzes from Herculaneum, in the National Museum at Naples; a collection of photographs of Renaissance architecture and ornament, and of Renaissance and baroque sculpture, medals and many other pieces. He was elected a benefactor of the museum in 1909.

=== Numismatic interests ===
Adams joined the American Numismatic Society in 1901, where he was a council member and on many committees involved in publishing the society's medals. In 1907 he was involved in the creation of a medal commemorating Sir Francis Drake, sculpted by Austrian medalist Rudolf Marschall. He donated Japanese medals to the Metropolitan Museum of Art in 1906. Adams privately commissioned Marschall to create the 1925 Truth Seeker medal.
