= Adams Power Plant Transformer House =

Structure in Niagara Falls, New York

- Adams Power Plant; Transformer House
- U.S. National Register of Historic Places
- U.S. National Historic Landmark
- New York State Register of Historic Places
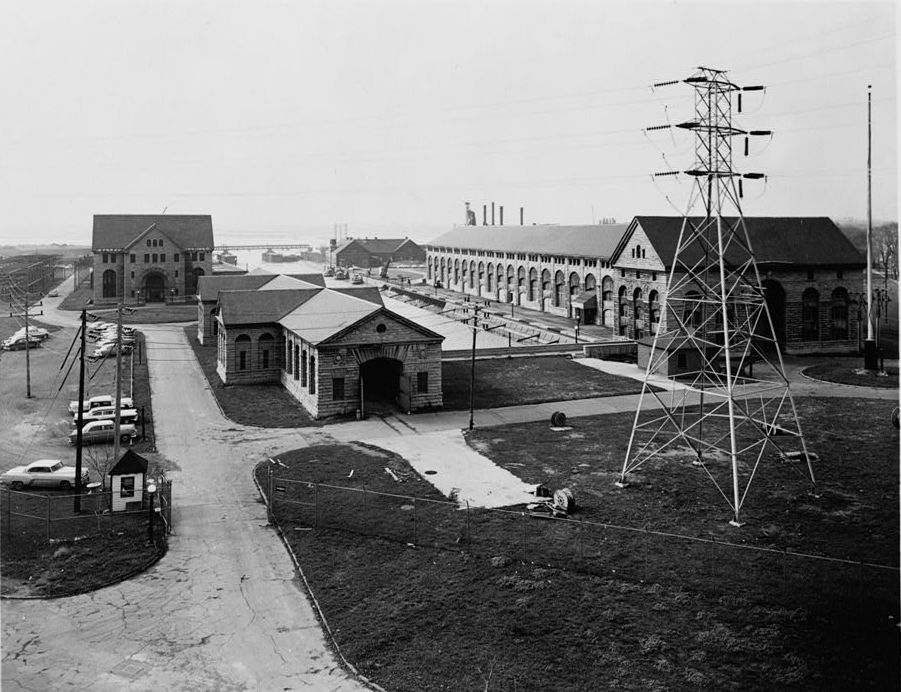
- Adams Power Plant, with transformer house in left foreground

- Location within New York
- Location: Niagara Falls, NY
- Coordinates: 43°4′54.35″N 79°2′34.21″W
- Built: 1895
- Architect: McKim, Mead, and White
- Architectural style: Beaux-Arts architecture
- NRHP reference No.: 75001212
- NYSRHP No.: 06340.000047

Significant dates
- Added to NRHP: June 1, 1975
- Designated NHL: May 4, 1983
- Designated NYSRHP: June 23, 1980

Adams Power Plant Transformer House in Niagara Falls, New York is a National Historic Landmark constructed in 1895. It is the only remaining structure that was part of the historic Edward Dean Adams Power Plant, the first large-scale, alternating current electric generating plant in the world, built in 1895. The building's eponym was Edward Dean Adams, a businessman and entrepreneur in the electrical field.

== History ==
The Adams power plant followed an 1886 plan by engineer Thomas Evershed to tap the power of Niagara Falls, which involved a "hydraulic canal" and a 7,500 feet (2,300 m) brick-lined tunnel, when the Niagara Falls Power Company was formed. The Cataract Construction Company, a new company formed to exploit the opportunity, led by president Edward Dean Adams, first formed the International Niagara Commission in 1890 to come up with a plan for harnessing the Falls. The Commission favored electricity, but could not recommend a solution to Cataract.

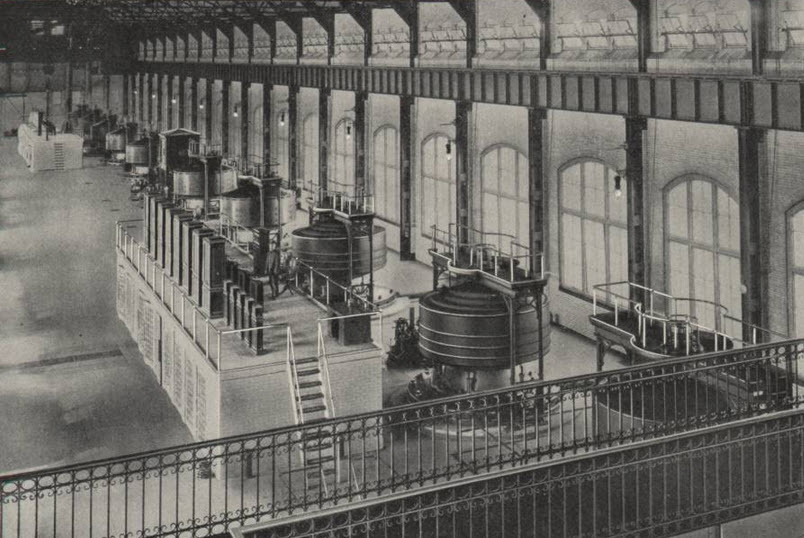
Ten 5,000 HP Westinghouse generators at Edward Dean Adams Power Plant

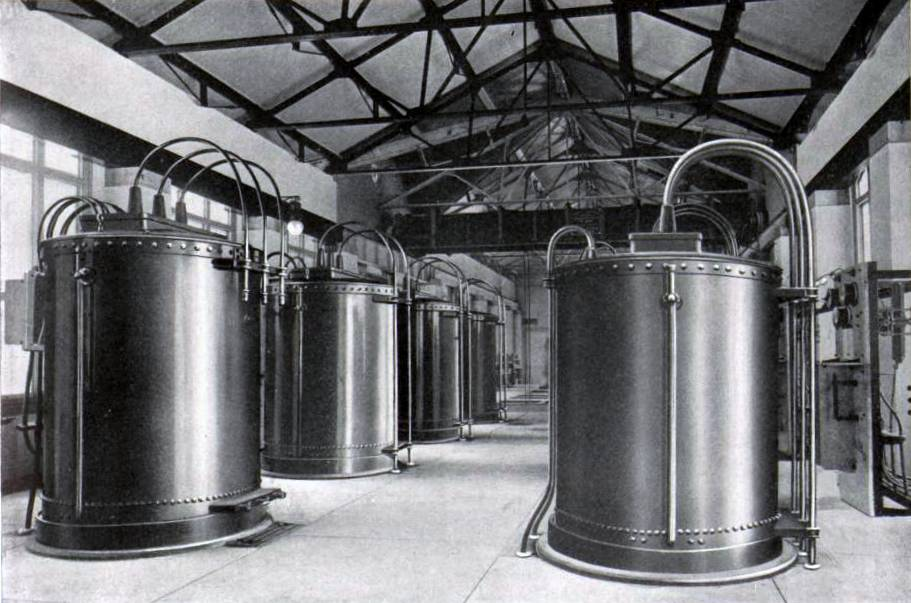
Eight of the ten 1,875 kW transformers at the Adams Power Plant Transformer House

In 1892, George Forbes was hired as a technical consultant and in May 1893 he convinced the company to build a hydroelectric system based on polyphase alternating current. Westinghouse Electric was subcontracted to build 5,000 horsepower (3,700 kW) 25 Hz AC generators, based on the work of Nikola Tesla and Benjamin G. Lamme, while the I. P. Morris Company of Philadelphia built the turbines based on the design of the Swiss company Faesch and Piccard.

The power plant went into operation on August 25, 1895. The transformer house building was designed by the architectural firm of McKim, Mead, and White. Locally quarried limestone was used in its construction. The transformer house was next to the power houses, which "built on the upper river, above deep excavations housing twenty-one generating units. Tailwater from the generators passed into a 7000-ft tailrace tunnel, which conveyed the water beneath the city to the lower river, near the present-day site of the Rainbow Bridge. The 18-ft by 21-ft tunnel required over 3 years to build, used more than 16 million bricks in a four-course lining. It also cost the lives of twenty-eight workers."

The Niagara Power Station No. 1, as it was then called, would eventually generate 50,000 horsepower (37 MW) of electricity. There were 10 generator rated 5,000 horsepower (3.7 MW) of the outside revolving field, vertical shaft type. The generators were separated into two banks of five generators each with independent switchboards. The output was at 2,000 volts to serve in and around Niagara Falls. There were transformers to step up the voltage to 10,000 volts to serve the medium distance around Niagara Falls areas. The voltage was also stepped up to 20,000 to serve the longer distance for Buffalo, Lockport, and Tonawanda. The station was the model for a second similar station built in 1904. The entire plant was officially named after Edward Dean Adams in 1927.

The original Westinghouse generators remained in operation until the plant closed in 1961, having been replaced by the Robert Moses Niagara Power Plant and the Lewiston Pump-Generating Plant. The Power Plant's main arch is found on Goat Island as the Power Portal.

The building was added to the National Register of Historic Places in 1975 and was designated a National Historic Landmark in 1983 and an IEEE Milestone in 1990. It is located off 15th St., just south of Buffalo Avenue. It is a major contributing feature to the Niagara Falls National Heritage Area.

== Gallery ==
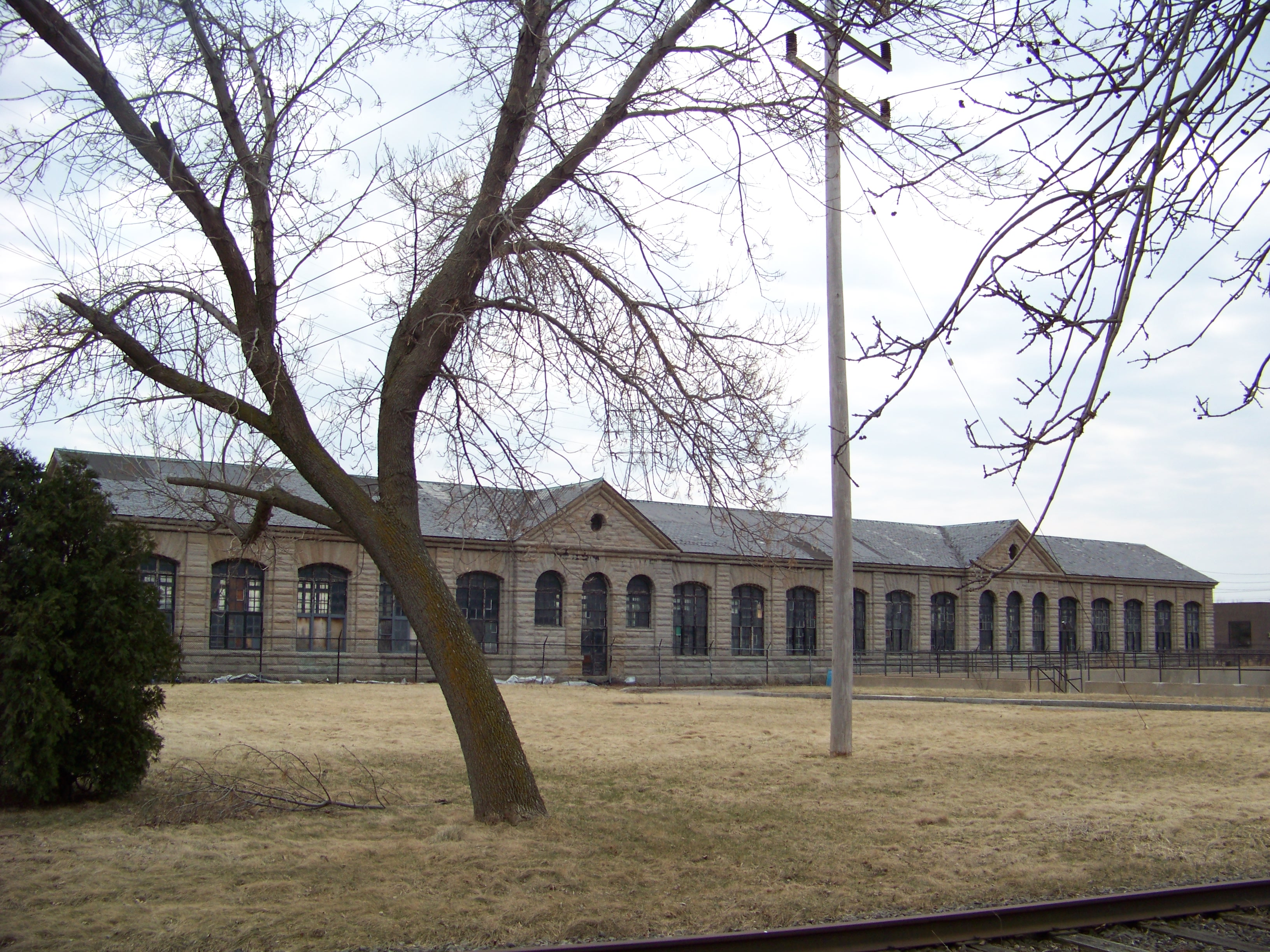
From the North, March 25, 2009

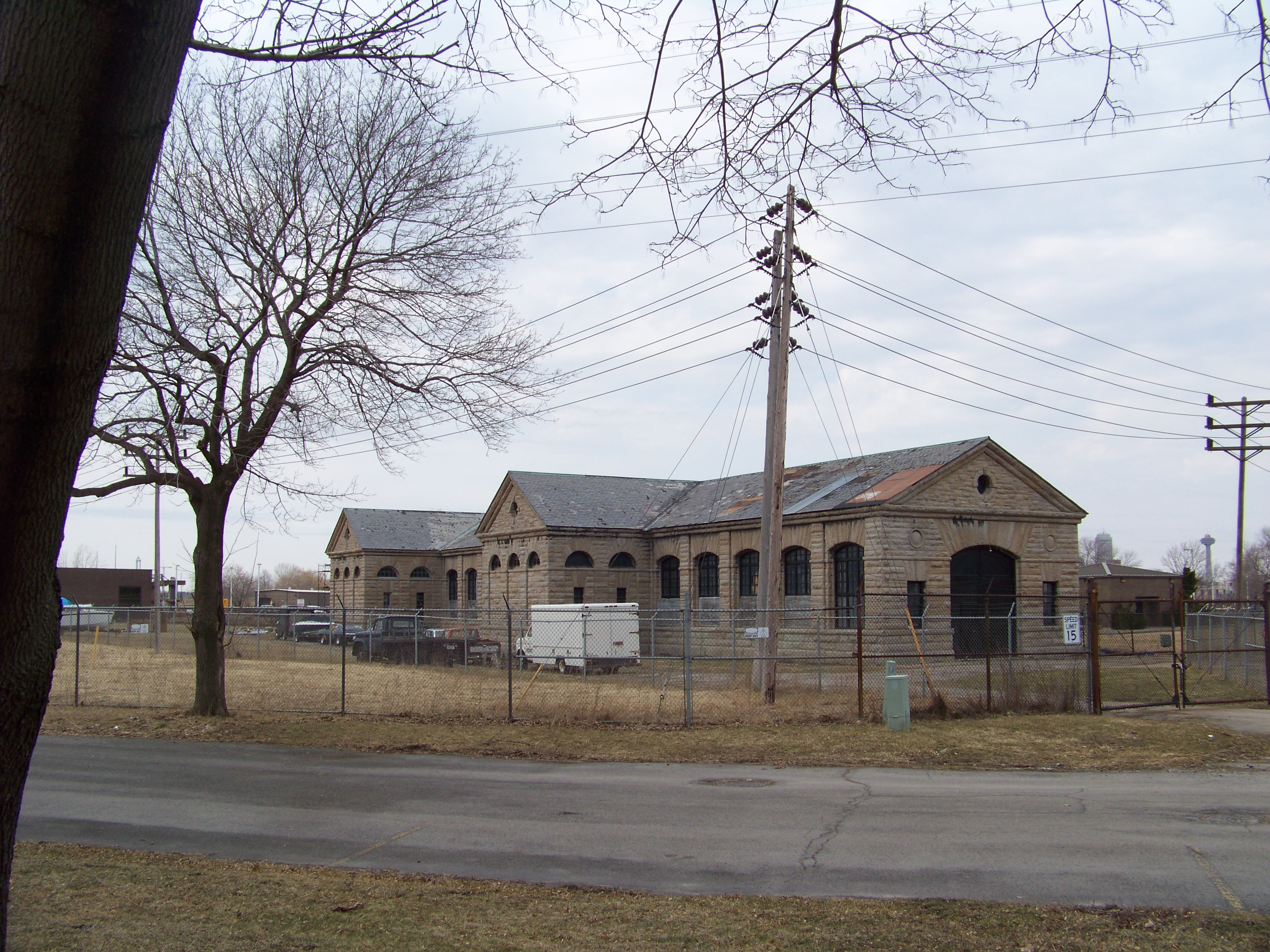
From the Southeast

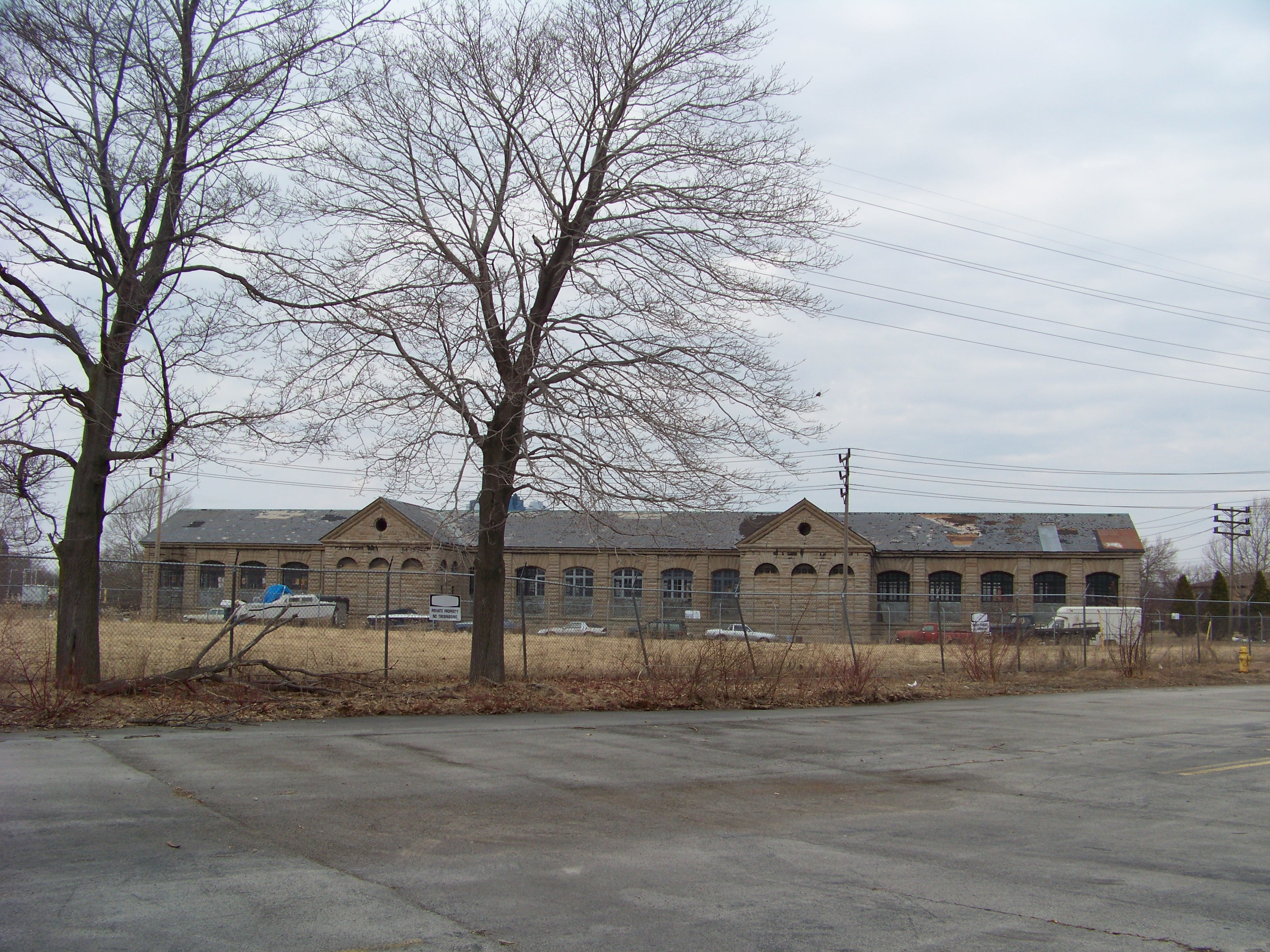
From the South

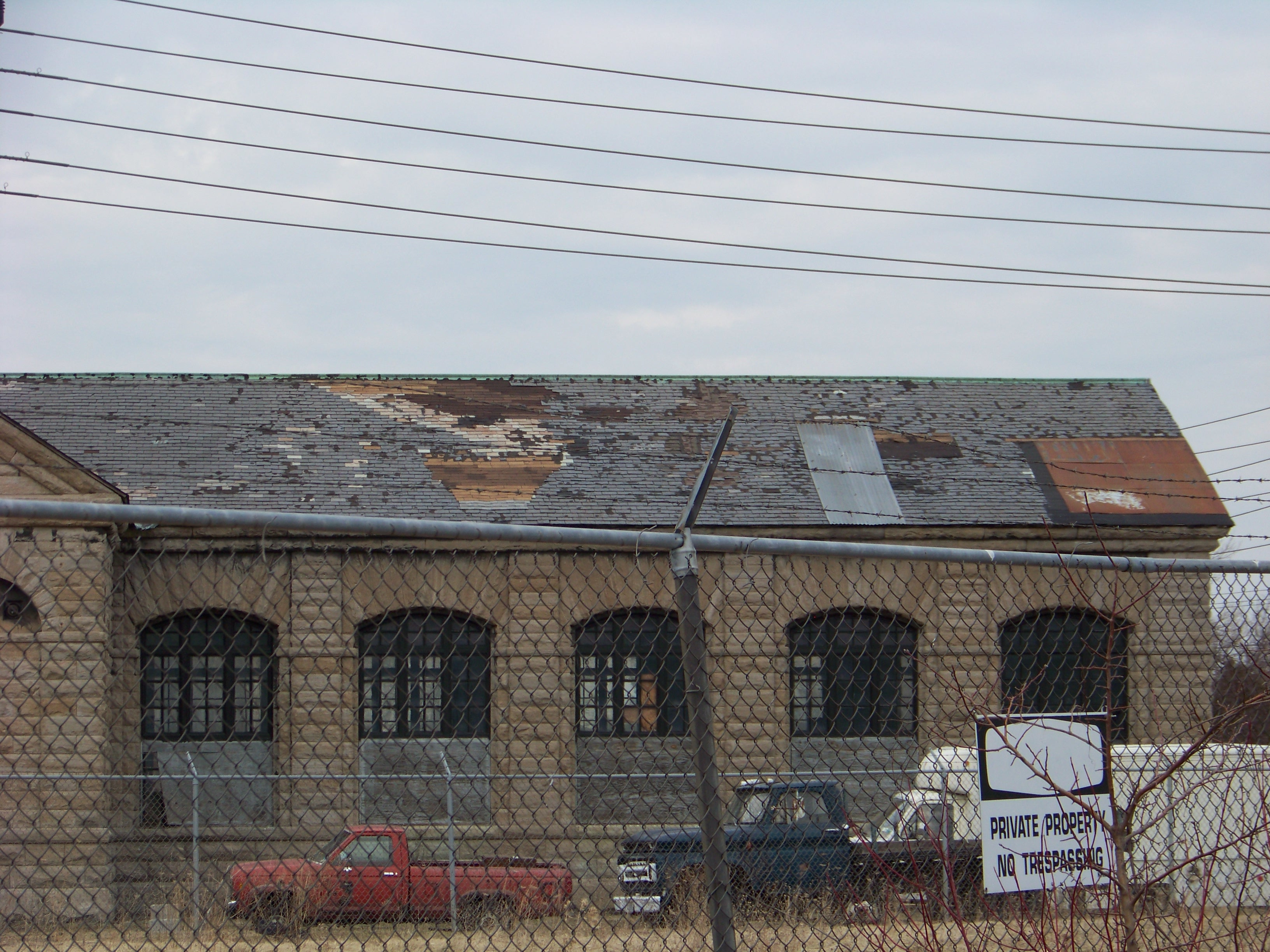
Roof in disrepair from the South

== See also ==
- List of National Historic Landmarks in New York
- National Register of Historic Places listings in Niagara County, New York
- List of Niagara Falls hydroelectric generating plants
