= Reservoir State Park =

State park in Niagara County, New York

- Location within New York
- Type: State park
- Location: Witmer Road; Niagara Falls, New York
- Nearest city: Niagara Falls, New York
- Coordinates: 43°08′10″N 79°00′58″W
- Area: 132 acres (0.53 km^{2})
- Operator: New York State Office of Parks, Recreation and Historic Preservation
- Visitors: 148,768 (in 2014)
- Open: All year
- Website: Reservoir State Park

Reservoir State Park is a 132-acre (0.53 km^{2}) state park located in the town of Lewiston in Niagara County, New York, United States. The park is situated on the south shore of the Robert Moses Power Plant Reservoir, north of the city of Niagara Falls.

== Park description ==
Reservoir State Park is situated within the boundaries of the Robert Moses Niagara Hydroelectric Power Plant property. The park is owned and financially supported by the New York Power Authority and operated by the New York State Office of Parks, Recreation and Historic Preservation.

The park offers picnic tables with pavilions, a playground, a nature trail, hiking, biking, fishing, cross-country skiing, sledding, snowmobiling, and fields for model airplane flying. There is a 150 yd long field that can be used as a golf driving range. The park also includes three tennis courts, eight softball diamonds, two basketball courts, and a roller hockey court.

A $6 million improvement project, funded by the New York Power Authority under an agreement with the Federal Energy Regulatory Commission, was completed at the park in 2012. The project focused on refurbishing many of the park's sports fields, improving accessibility at the park's playground, and constructing a warming hut near the sledding hill.

== See also ==
- List of New York state parks
