= Hatch Mott MacDonald =

- Type: Private
- Industry: Engineering, infrastructure, design
- Founded: 1996
- Headquarters: 111 Wood Avenue South, Iselin, New Jersey
- Key people: Nicholas M. DeNichilo
- Number of employees: 2,500
- Parent: Hatch Ltd and Mott MacDonald
- Website: web.archive.org/web/20160304192707/http://www.hatchmott.com/

Hatch Mott MacDonald (HMM) was a consulting engineering firm serving public and private clients in North America. HMM's capabilities included planning, project development, studies and analysis, design, procurement, and construction engineering and inspection. HMM also provided project, program and construction management as well as facility maintenance and operations. The partnered companies separated in 2016.

== History ==
Hatch Mott MacDonald was founded in 1996 by its parent companies, Hatch Ltd and Mott MacDonald. HMM was intended to take advantage of engineering opportunities in North America.

HMM originally provided the bulk of its services in transportation, including the design of tunnels, rail systems, bridges, highways, and airport infrastructure. In 2001, Hatch Mott MacDonald acquired Killam Associates, a New Jersey–based water, wastewater, and environmental services company. HMM has continued to follow a strategy of organic growth coupled with strategic acquisitions.

As of 2013, Engineering News-Record ranked HMM number 36 among its "Top 500 Design Firms in the United States." Highways and bridges, oil and gas pipelines, rail and transit, tunneling, and water and wastewater services are among the largest contributors to revenue.

The Sea-to-Sky Highway Improvement Project is one of HMM's most high-profile projects in the area of highways and bridges. The design-build contractor Peter Kiewit Sons of Kiewit Corporation chose HMM to improve the British Columbia Highway 99, which averaged 574 accidents a year between 1998 and 2004. HMM led 12 design consultants and a team of about 100 people to complete the design of over 65 kilometers of new highway improvements, including 40 bridge structures. The project has reportedly won more than a dozen national and international awards, including Canada's Lieutenant Governor's Award.

From 2007 to 2012, HMM provided project management, preliminary design, environmental engineering, permitting, and right-of-way acquisition services for three segments of the California High-Speed Rail system, each with challenging elements. These included to section between Palmdale, California and Los Angeles, which traverses rivers, mountains, densely populated cities, sensitive ecosystems, and three major fault lines.

Among HMM's large oil and gas pipeline projects is Spectra Energy's Time III/Temax project, which carries supplies from Rocky Mountain natural gas reserves across Pennsylvania. The pipeline has a capacity of four billion cubic feet of natural gas per day. In September 2011, Pipeline & Gas Journal reported that the project was finished on time and under budget.

Tunnels and Tunnelling magazine ranks HMM first among engineering consultants by tunneling revenue in North America. Trenchless Technology magazine ranks HMM number two among design firms in the field of trenchless tunneling technology. HMM played a key role in guiding the alignment of Seattle's Alaskan Way Viaduct replacement tunnel (Seattle), directing the tunnel away from the original narrow corridor through the historic Pioneer District.

HMM provided engineering services to major water providers, including American Water (company), Aqua America, the District of Columbia Water and Sewer Authority (DC Water), New York City Department of Environmental Protection, and Philadelphia Water Department. HMM engineers have promoted an integrated approach to wastewater management, writing in Water Canada that "the integration and optimization of stormwater, wastewater, and other source pollution will maximize long-term water quality planning benefits for each dollar spent."

In 2015, Hatch and Mott MacDonald announced that HMM would be separated into two distinct businesses. HMM's Canada business became part of Hatch while HMM's US business became part of Mott MacDonald. HMM's Pipelines business, which operated in both Canada and the US, also joined Mott MacDonald. The changes allow Mott MacDonald and Hatch to continue to operate in all sectors throughout North America. Keith Howells and John Bianchini, the CEOs of Mott MacDonald and Hatch, made the following comment: "At a time of significant renewal in North American infrastructure, this change allows Hatch and Mott MacDonald and the staff of HMM to build and invest in new ways." Nick DeNichilo, HMM's CEO, continued to lead the HMM business until the company separation concluded. At that point, DeNichilo became President and CEO of Mott MacDonald in North America following the separation of HMM into two distinct businesses. Hatch Infrastructure in North America was led by Michael Schatz, Managing Director of Infrastructure. These arrangements were finalized April 26, 2016.

== Major Projects ==
Other major HMM projects have included the following:

- GO Transit Rail Improvement Programme (Toronto)
- Calgary West Light Rail Transit (Calgary)
- Canpotex Terminal Development (North Vancouver)
- CONSOL Energy Wing Tip Bridge (Summit Bechtel Family National Scout Reserve, West Virginia)
- East Side Access (New York City)
- King Road Grade Separation (Burlington, Ontario)
- Los Angeles International Airport (LAX) Modernization (Los Angeles)
- SDSU Transit Center in San Diego, California
- San Francisco–Oakland Bay Bridge (San Francisco)
- Tampa Bay Desalination Plant (Tampa)

== Awards ==
In the five years spanning 2009 to 2013, HMM won more than 100 awards for its people and projects, including the following.

- 2013 Award of Excellence, Canadian Consulting Engineering Awards, Calgary West Light Rail Transit
- 2013 Award of Excellence, Canadian Consulting Engineering Awards, Squamish Pedestrian Overpass
- 2013 Project of the Year (New Install), Trenchless Technology, Empire Connector Extension
- 2011 Be Inspired Award for Innovation in Rail and Transit, Bentley, Toronto-York Spadina Subway Extension
- 2011 Award of Excellence, Canadian Consulting Engineering Awards, GO Transit Rail Improvements
- 2010 Design-Build Excellence Award, Design-Build Institute of America, Sea-to-Sky Highway Improvement
- 2010 Engineering Excellence Grand Award, American Council of Engineering Companies, Sea-to-Sky Highway Improvement
- 2010 Engineering Excellence Grand Award, American Council of Engineering Companies, Section 710 Beacon Hill Station and Tunnels
