= International Control Dam =

Dam on the Niagara River

Coordinates: 43°04′20.1″N 79°03′31.0″W

International Niagara Control Works; International Joint Commission
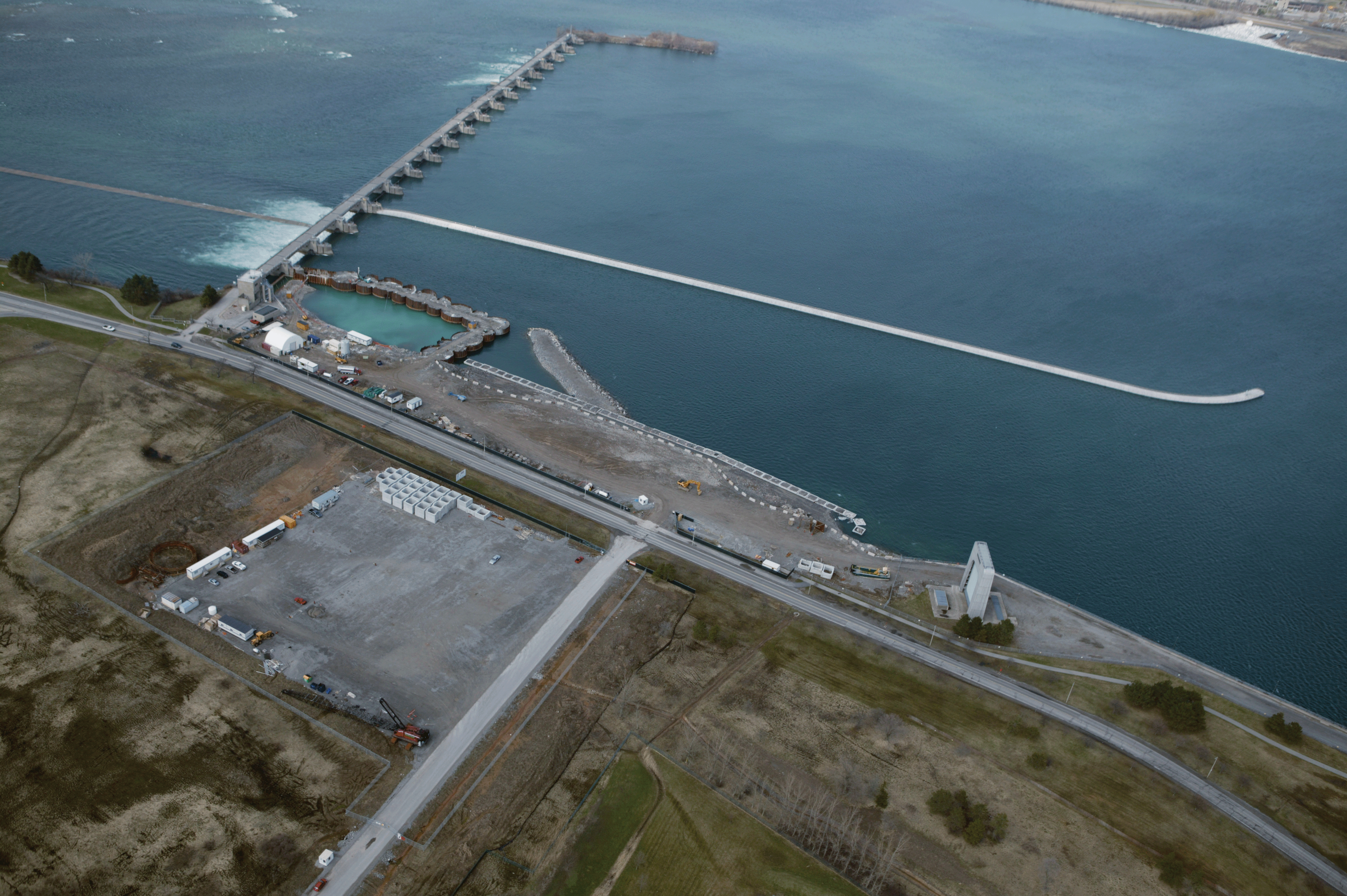
- The dam as viewed from the Canadian side
- Interactive map of: International Niagara Control Works; International Joint Commission
- Opening date: 1954

The International Control Dam, also known as the International Control Structure, operated by Ontario Power Generation, is a weir that controls the water diversions from the Niagara River and dispatches the water between the New York Power Authority and Ontario Power Generation in accordance with the terms of the 1950 Niagara Treaty. It was completed in 1954.

To preserve Niagara Falls' natural beauty and to ensure an "unbroken curtain of water" is flowing over the falls, the 1950 treaty was signed by the U.S. and Canada to limit water usage by power plants.

The treaty allows higher summertime diversion at night when tourists are fewer and during the winter months when there are even fewer tourists. The treaty states that during daylight time during the tourist season (April 1 to October 31), there must be 100,000 cubic feet per second (2,800 m^{3}/s) of water flowing over the falls, and during the night and off-tourist season there must be 50,000 cubic feet per second (1,400 m^{3}/s) of water flowing over the falls. This treaty is monitored by the International Niagara Board of Control, part of the International Joint Commission, using a NOAA gauging station above the falls.

This weir allows water from the upper river to be diverted into the intakes for the American and Canadian power stations. Two tunnels on the United States' side take water under the city of Niagara Falls, New York, and three tunnels on the Canadian side divert water under the city of Niagara Falls, Ontario. Once past these cities, the water flows into two canals and then into two large reservoirs. Behind the Canadian Sir Adam Beck Power Station is a reservoir covering 300 hectares (740 acres) and a similar reservoir on the US side behind the Robert Moses Power Plant.

A trade-off exists between the two main industries of tourism and hydroelectric power. More water is diverted by the International Control Dam at night, between 10:00 pm and 7:00 am, filling the reservoirs overnight and allowing more water over Niagara Falls in the daytime hours for the tourists. As well, during the winter, from November 1 to March 31, when it is not the tourism season, more water is diverted for electrical power during the whole 24 hour period.

The pool of water located immediately upstream of the International Water Control Dam is named the "Chippawa – Grass Island pool".
