= Queen Victoria Park =

Parkland in Niagara Falls, Ontario

Coordinates: 43.0795°N 79.0791°W

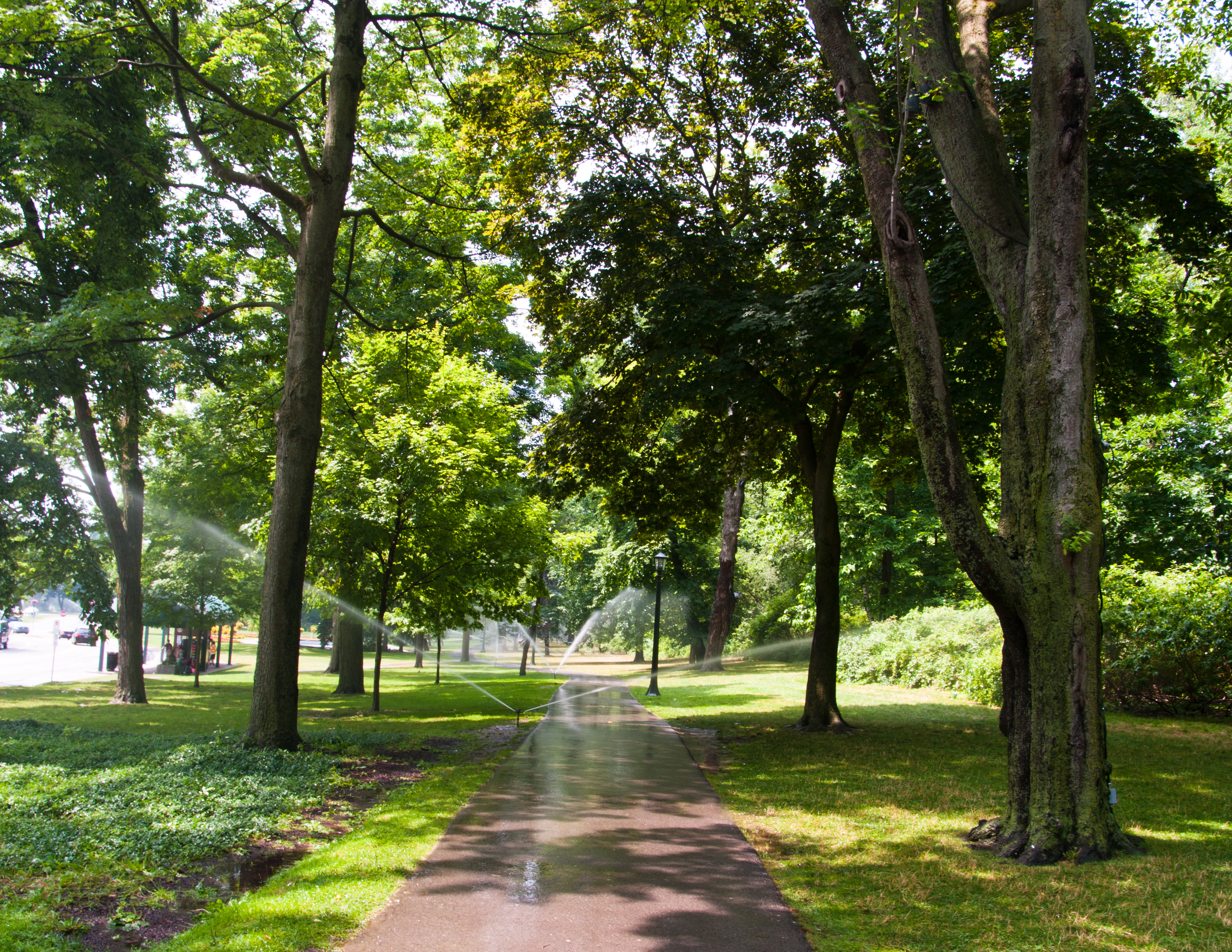
Queen Victoria Park

Queen Victoria Park is the main parkland located in Niagara Falls, Ontario, Canada opposite the American and Canadian Horseshoe Falls. Established by the Niagara Falls Park Act in 1885 and opened in 1888, the park is operated by the Niagara Parks Commission and is considered the centerpiece of the Niagara Falls recreational tourist area.

The park is known for its outstanding flower displays of daffodils and roses in-season, with many of the plantings done in a carpet-bedding design. Queen Victoria Park is also the focal point for the annual winter Festival of Lights.

== History ==
=== Prior to 1888 ===
The area comprising Queen Victoria Park was originally part of the upper Niagara River bed. Father Louis Hennepin is purported to be the first European visitor to explore the area in depth in 1678. Active settlements in the area did not begin until the dawn of the 19th century with the establishment of a small hut which served as an inn. William Forsyth, a Buffalo immigrant, settled in the area in 1818 and by 1822, had established the first stairway down to the lower Niagara River below the falls, in addition to the first substantial building in the area, the Pavilion Hotel. By the late 1820s, the parcel was sold to Thomas Clark and Samuel Street, who began the construction of several buildings near the area now called Table Rock on the south end of the future park property. They were joined in competition by Thomas Barnett who, in 1827, built a museum just south of Table Rock, on the present site of the Table Rock Centre. The north end of the property, now occupied by Oakes Garden Theatre, housed the Clifton House, built in 1833 and catering to the well-to-do traveller.

Samuel Zimmerman, who built his fortune on helping construct the second Welland Canal and the Great Western Railway, then appropriated 52 acres (210,000 m^{2}) of land opposite the American Falls with plans to design an elaborate estate. The estate did not come to pass; upon Zimmerman's tragic death in a railway accident in 1856, only two gatehouses and a fountain had been built.

By the late 1850s, Saul Davis came to Canada after having operated the Prospect House in Niagara Falls, New York. He immediately erected a similar museum next to Barnett's, called Table Rock House. Barnett and Davis soon became bitter rivals, as each fiercely attempted to outdo the other with competing stairways down to the lower level of the Horseshoe Falls. Customers desiring to go to one museum would be intercepted by members of the other museum and forced to pay (often by way of threats of physical violence by Davis' employees) for services and products they did not want to buy. This area became known as The Front, a notorious tourist trap.

By 1859, Barnett built a substantial building on the site of the present-day Victoria Park Restaurant and began adding to his museum collection there, yet his war with Davis at the Falls would last into the 1870s, when Barnett's riverfront museum went into receivership.

The first suggestion of a park at this site came in 1873 as an idea offered by Edmund Burke Wood, a member of Canadian Parliament, in an effort to quell the criminal element in the area. This idea was refused, however, by the new Ontario Premier, Oliver Mowat, even when given a federal offer to split the cost of establishing such a park. By 1880, Mowat began considering the possibility of using a private corporation to take on the idea. Several proposals were floated in the ensuing years, all either struck down by Mowat or failing to get legislative backing. Mowat did not want the government to pay for land acquisition and development.

A three-member committee was established in 1885, headed by Polish immigrant Sir Casimir Gzowski, who proposed a government-run park encompassing 118 acres (0.48 km^{2}), to be free to the public. A follow-up report in 1887 warning of "general regret and disappointment" convinced Mowat to push through the Queen Victoria Niagara Falls Park Act in March, 1887. Unsightly outbuildings were razed, grounds were cleaned up, and Queen Victoria Park was officially opened to the public on May 24, 1888, the birthday of Queen Victoria.

=== 1888 to 1945 ===
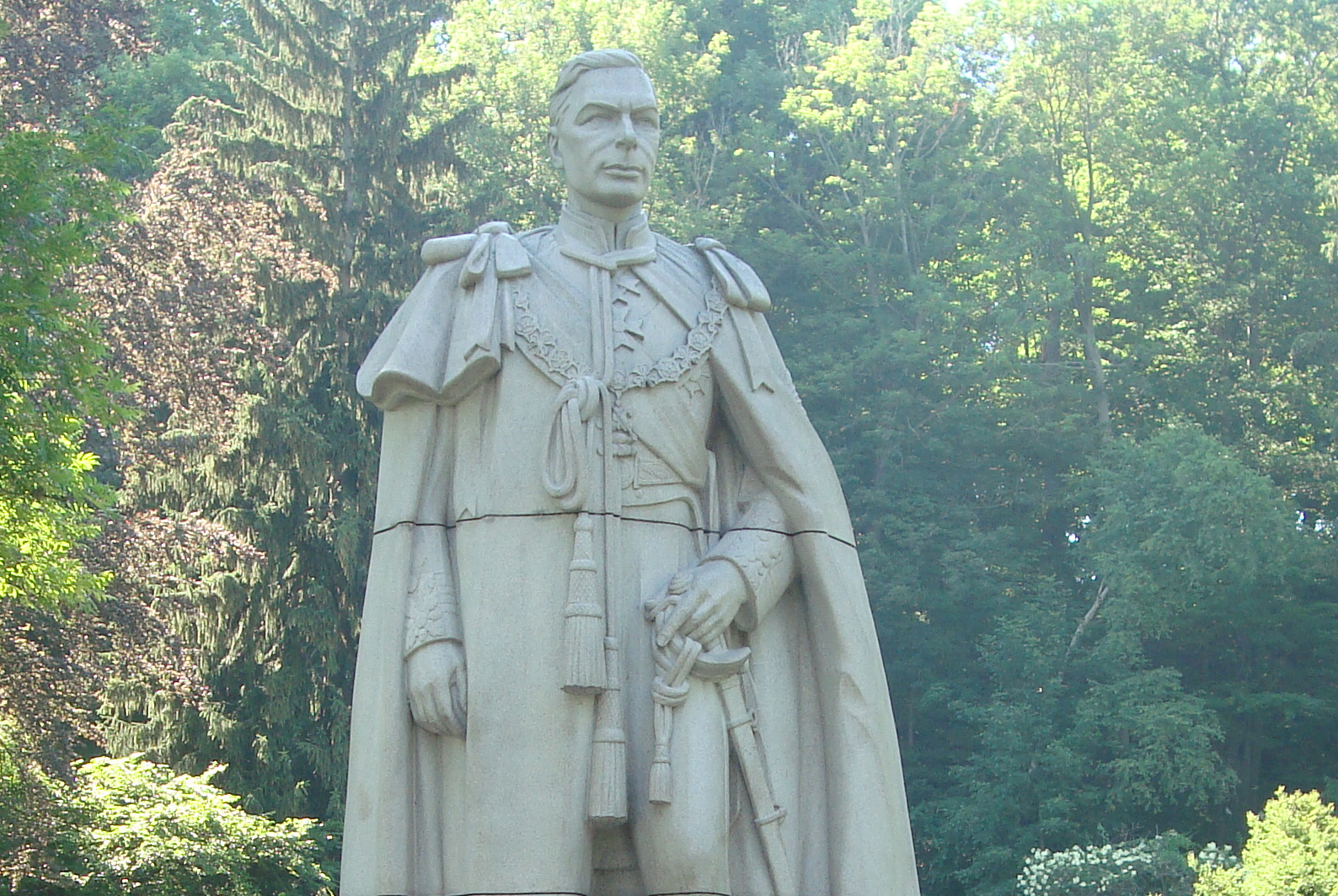
King George VI statue is centrally located in the park.

Admittance to the new park was free, a charge was only levied if visitors requested tour guides to accompany them. By 1890, however, it was found that incoming revenue was 90% below what the Queen Victoria Niagara Falls Park Commission was budgeting for. Not wanting to ask the Provincial Government for bonds, the Commission granted a licence to the Niagara Falls and Park River Railway to run a rail route from Chippawa to Queenston. The line was in service by 1893 and was run by electricity; its power plant constructed south of the Horseshoe Falls being the first hydroelectric power plant erected on the Canadian side. Nearly half a million passengers rode the railway in 1894, which brought more of them to the new park and provided the commission with a surplus by 1895. The Commission then took over the Behind The Sheet attraction at Table Rock (the forerunner to the Journey Behind the Falls attraction), and began making aesthetic improvements to the park over the next several years. The Commission opened its first greenhouse in 1896 as part of an effort to beautify the park; it had been virtually barren of mature trees when first established. Thomas Barnett's museum was demolished in 1903 and the present-day Victoria Park Restaurant, known then as the Refectory, was opened in 1904. The Commission granted franchises to three more hydroelectric power plants to raise additional revenue between 1904 and 1918: the Electrical Development Company of Toronto, the Ontario Powerhouse, and the Rankine power station.

A refectory (1926) and administration building (1927) were built by Findlay and Foulis, who built Table Rock House (now part of Table Rock Welcome Centre) in 1925-1926 and Hotel General Brock in 1927–1929.

The original Clifton Hotel north of the park was lost to fire in 1898. Its replacement likewise was destroyed by fire in December, 1932. Harry Oakes, a mining millionaire who had already established roots in Niagara Falls, bought the property and presented it to the Niagara Parks Commission (the name shortened from 1921). Oakes Garden Theatre was built on the site and opened in September, 1937, as part of a plan to beautify the entrance into Canada at the Upper Steel Arch Bridge. Four months later, the bridge was toppled by a severe ice jam in January 1938, and the present-day Rainbow Bridge was built further downriver, opening in 1941. The Arch Bridge area would eventually become the Rainbow Gardens.

The Queenston/Chippawa Railway abandoned its lease in 1932, presenting the commission with further financial peril. Compensation to the railway went to arbitration and lasted nearly five years, ending with a million-dollar compensation order paid for by the commission. This judgment, along with the approach of World War II, restricted the commission's ability to make improvements to the Park until the late 1940s.

== See also ==
- Niagara Falls State Park
