= Fallsview Tourist Area =

Coordinates: 43.081264°N 79.082645°W

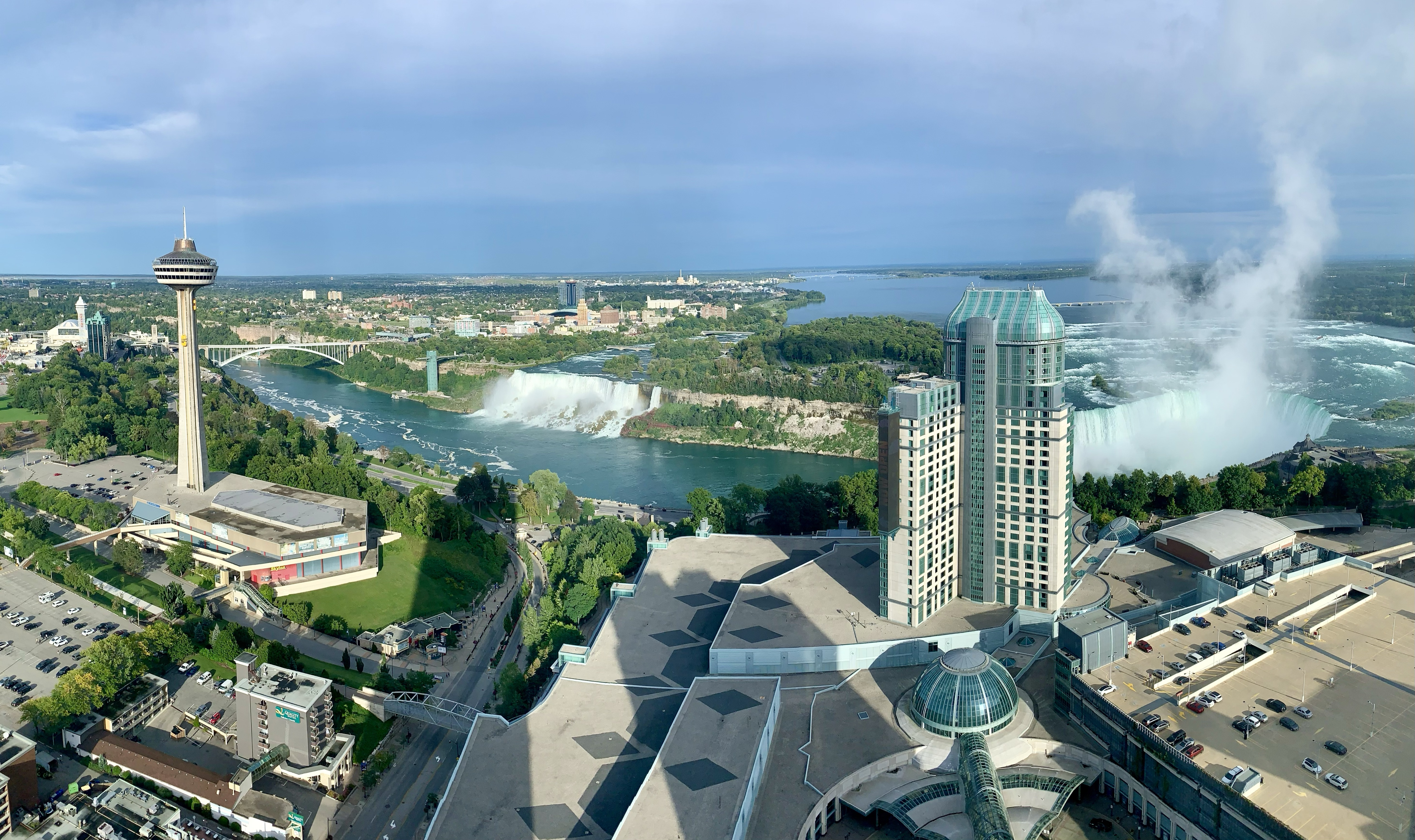
The American Falls (left) and Horseshoe Falls (right) as viewed from the Hilton Niagara Falls Tower 2's 44th floor. The Skylon Tower (left) and Niagara Fallsview Casino Resort (right) are in the foreground.

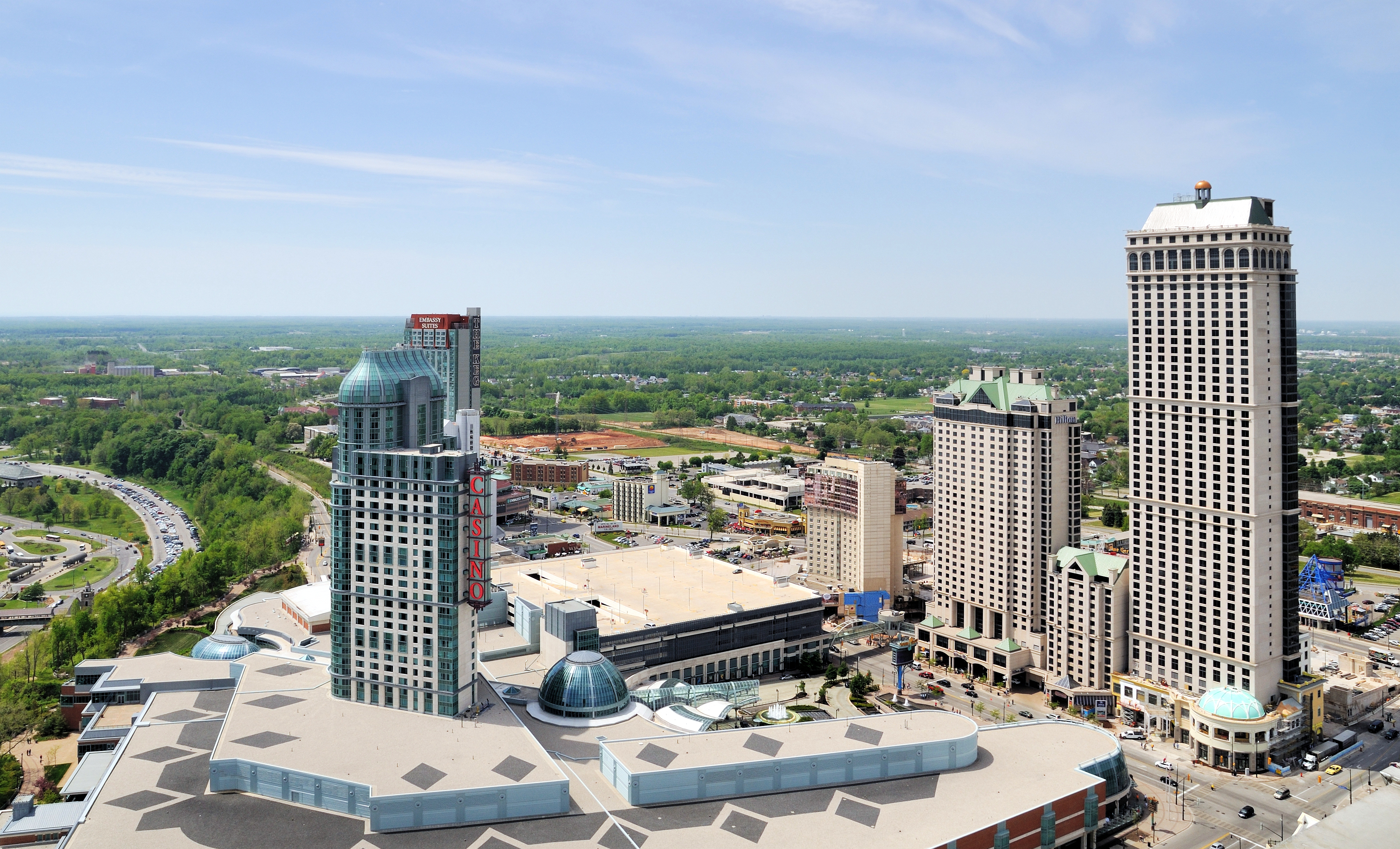
Hilton Niagara Falls (right) and Niagara Fallsview Casino Resort (left)

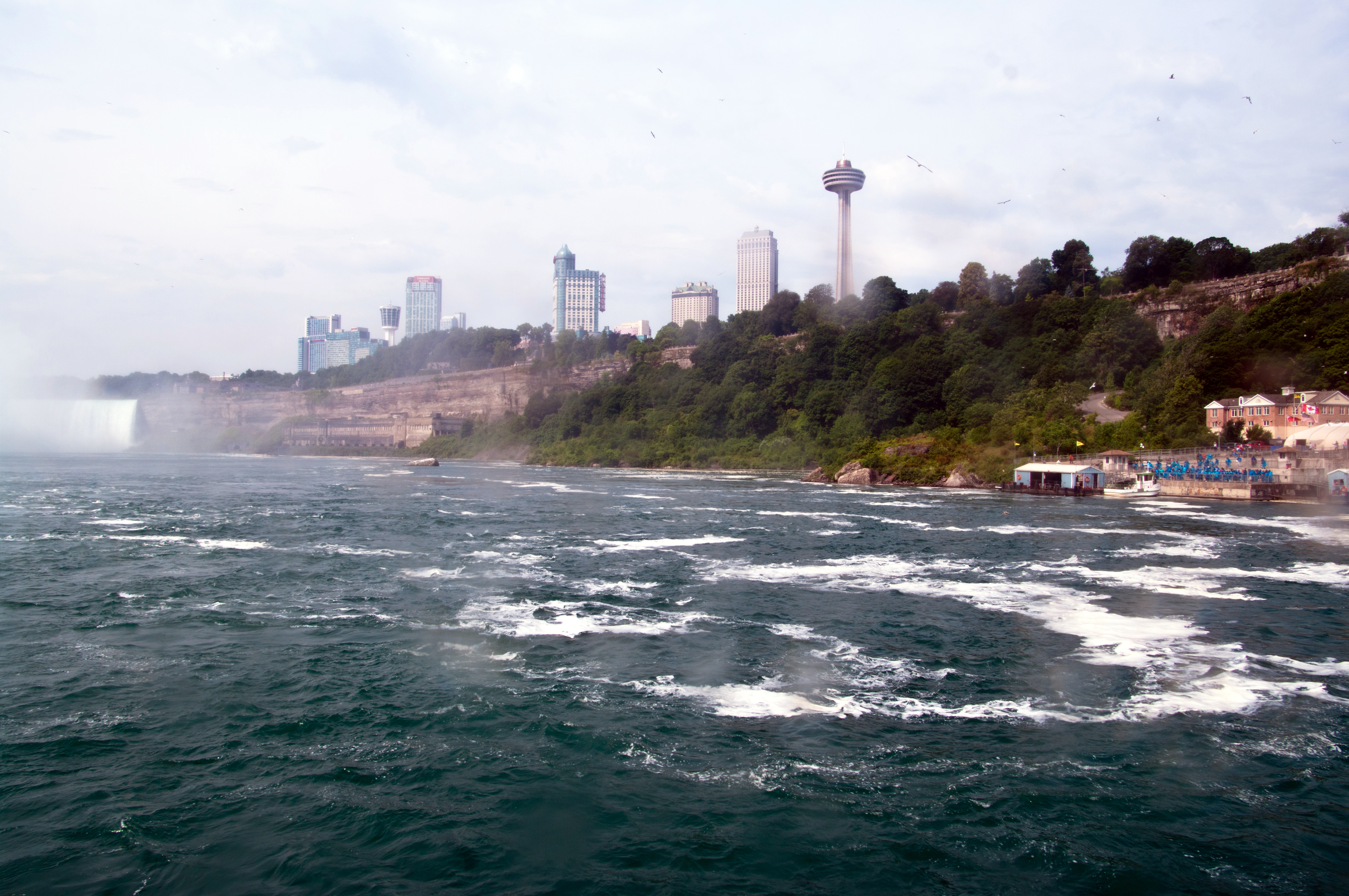
View towards the Fallsview Tourist Area from the river in 2012

The Fallsview Tourist Area in Niagara Falls, Ontario, Canada is one of the main tourist areas surrounding the Falls.

The neighborhood is centered around Fallsview Boulevard. It is directly south of the Clifton Hill neighborhood, and is roughly bounded to the north by Market Street, to the east by the beginning of the slope down to the Niagara Gorge, on the south by Marineland Parkway, and to the west by railroad tracks.

In recent years, it has become the home many of the hotels in the city, such as: the Niagara Falls Hilton, Niagara Falls Marriott Gateway, and the recently opened Comfort Inn Fallsview. Niagara Fallsview Casino Resort is also located near the centre of this area. It is also the location of the Skylon Tower and Minolta Tower.

The area is linked to the Table Rock Center and Journey Behind the Falls, on the Niagara Parkway just above the falls, by the Falls Incline Railway.

== Traffic congestion ==
The Fallsview Tourist area was also known for its gridlock traffic issues. These traffic issues were mostly caused by shortages of parking spaces in the area for tourists during peak demand periods and a lack of transportation services in the area. Main streets through the area (Stanley Avenue and Fallsview Blvd.) have been widened recently to address this issue, and parking has improved. The Niagara Parks Commission provided a parking lot (capacity: 200) just north of the Falls Incline Railway.
