= Tower Hotel (Niagara Falls) =

Tower in Niagara Falls, Canada

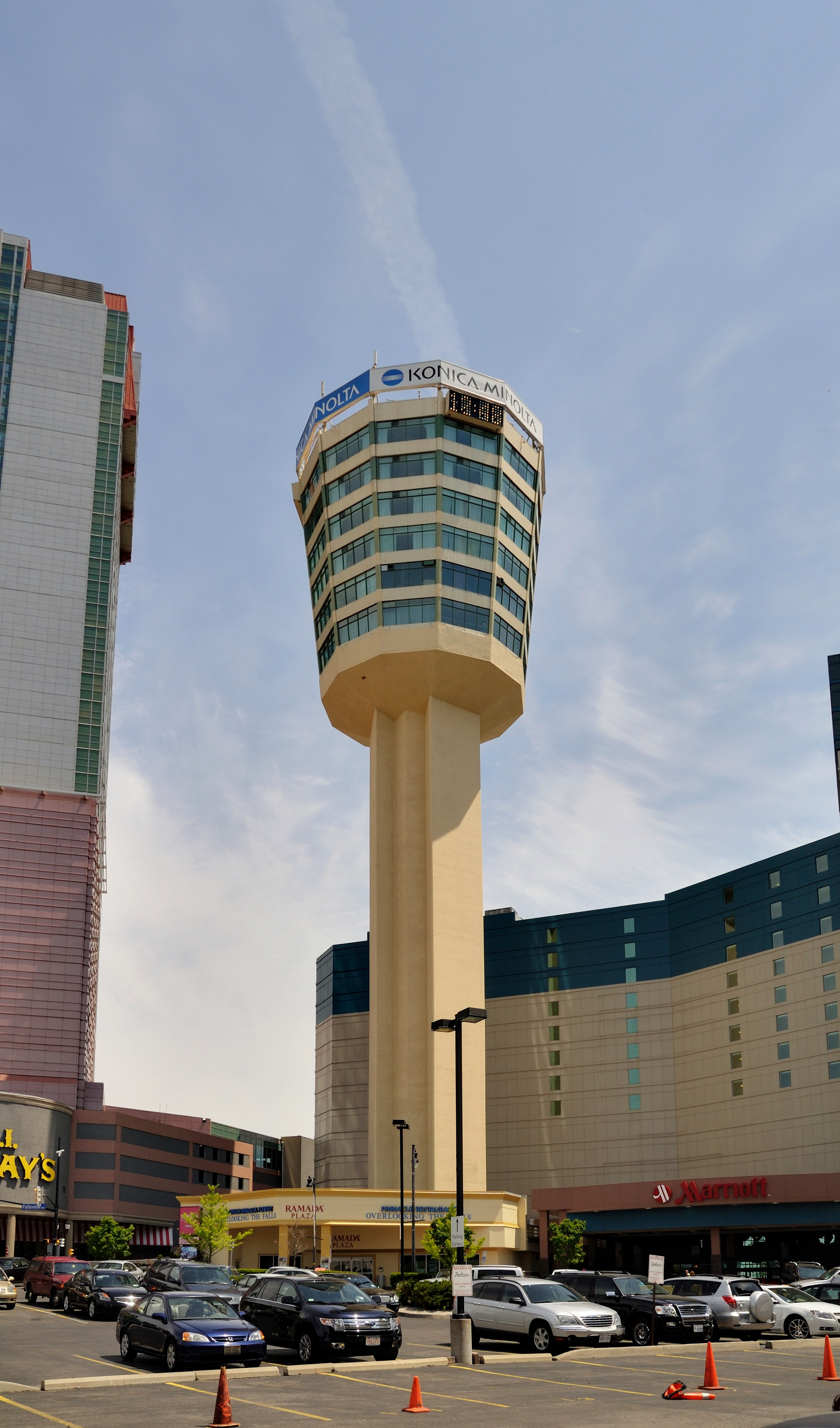
- The tower before the 2010 renovations

General information
- Location: 6732 Fallsview Blvd, Niagara Falls, Ontario, Canada
- Coordinates: 43.078947°N 79.082084°W
- Groundbreaking: March 15, 1961
- Opened: July 1, 1962; 64 years ago
- Renovated: 2010 (most recent)

Website
- www.niagaratower.com

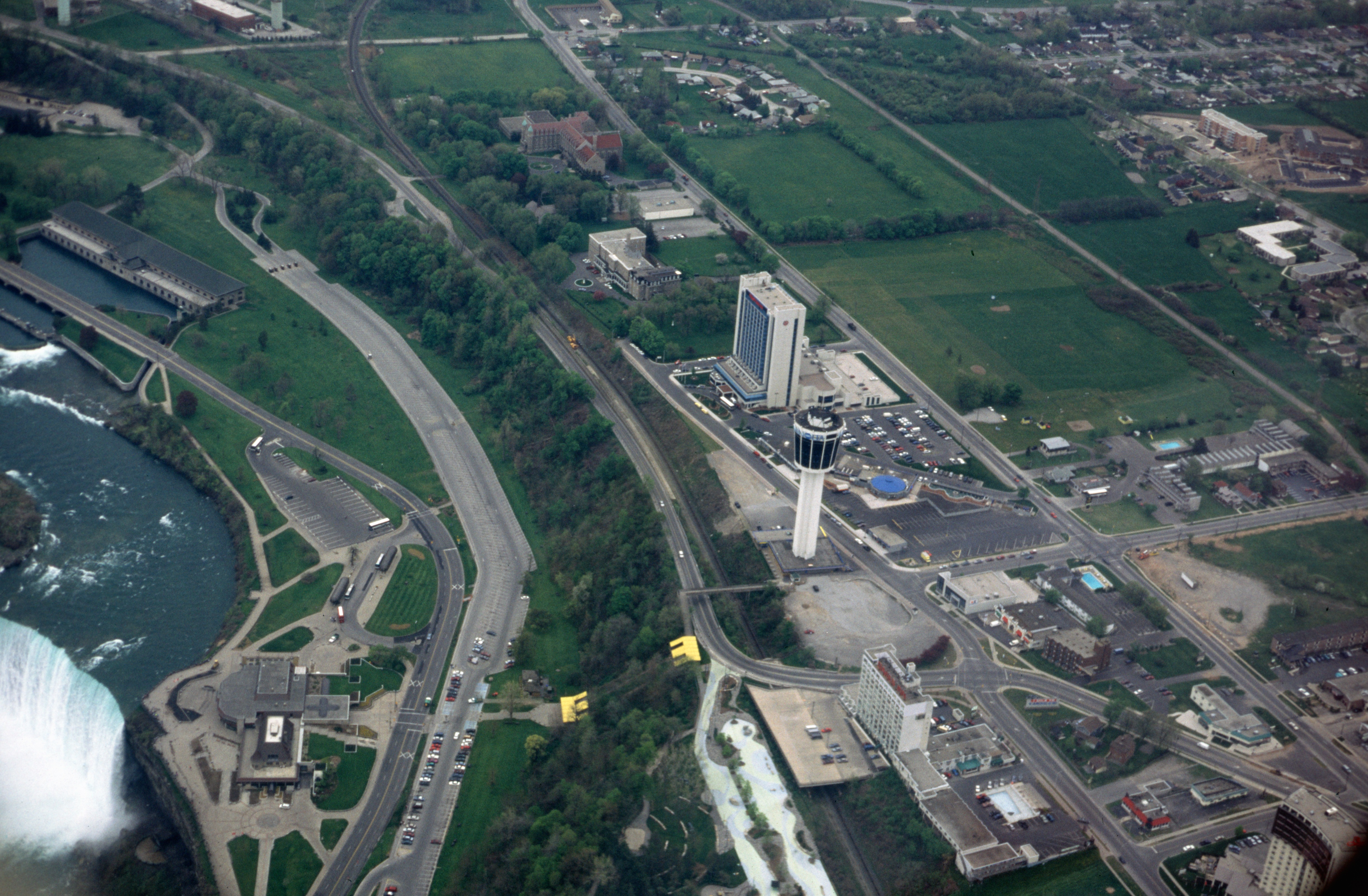
Konica Minolta Tower in the mid-1980s (aerial view), before construction of surrounding hotels and Fallsview Casino (which was built on the footprint of the building in the lower-right)

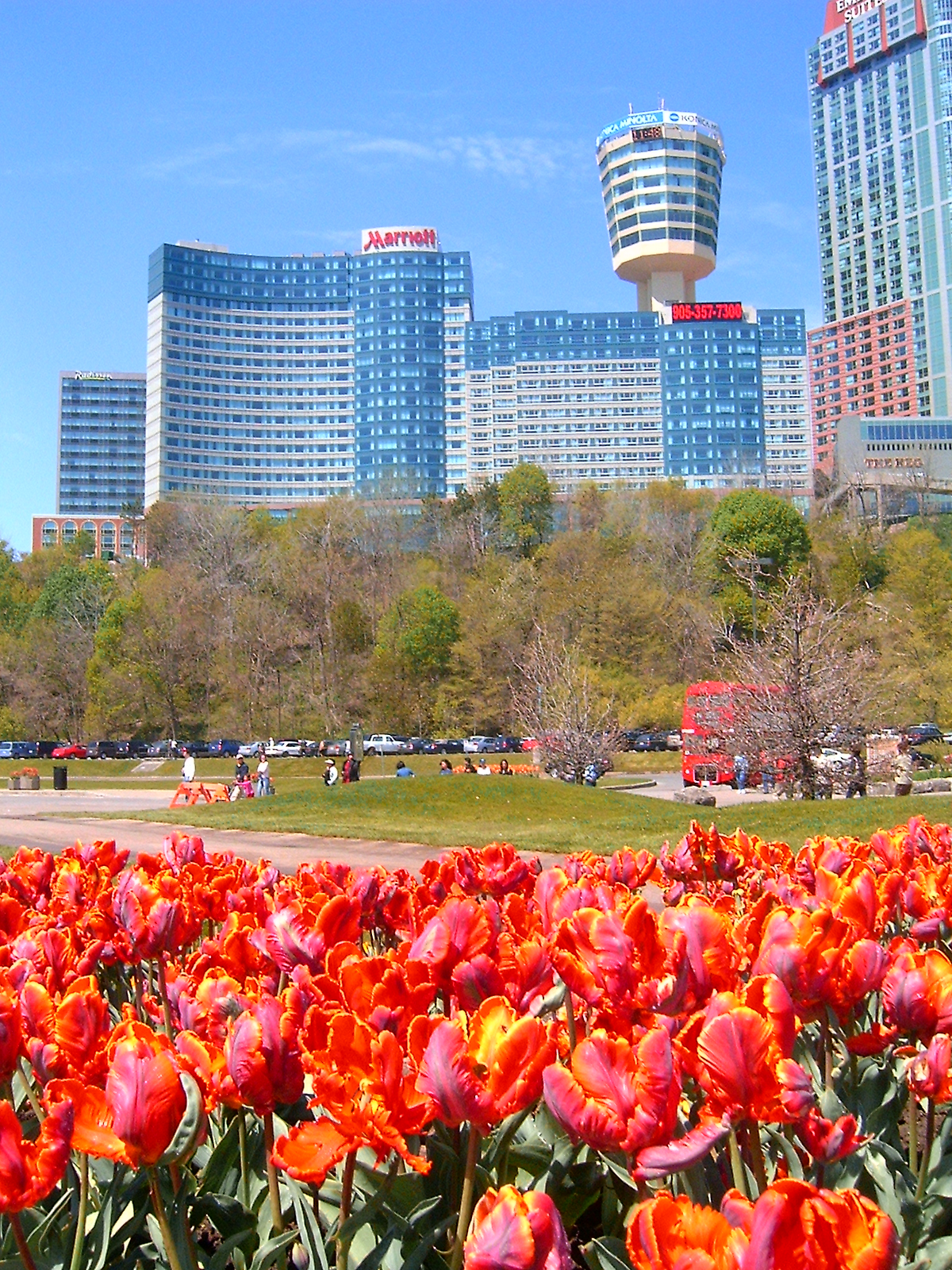
Konica Minolta Tower in the mid-2000s surrounded by hotels and casinos in the Fallsview area

The Tower Hotel Fallsview Niagara Falls, opened in 1962, is located in the Fallsview district of Niagara Falls, Ontario and was the first of the contemporary observation towers built near the brink of the Falls. It features an indoor observation deck, restaurant, and hotel. The tower is 99 metres (325 feet) tall above street level and 160 metres (520 feet) above the falls. The tower assumed its present name in 2010 as a result of its most recent renovation; as Minolta was the longest-tenured sponsor of the building, tourists and locals may still call it the Minolta Tower.

== History ==
=== Previous towers ===
For more than 100 years, there had been various smaller towers built throughout the area with most of them being wooden structures. Two notable towers were the wood construction tower located at the top of Drummond Hill on Lundy's Lane behind the historic Drummond Inn, and Street's Pagoda on Cedar Island.

- Drummond Hill Tower was built for visitors to have an aerial view of the War of 1812 Battle of Lundy's Lane battle field and the Drummond Hill Cemetery where many British and American soldiers killed during the battle are buried.
- Street's Pagoda was named for an early area settler, Thomas "T.C." Street, who had ownership of Cedar Island, located between the Horseshoe Falls and Dufferin Islands. This tower was dismantled in 1887, and Cedar Island was eventually made part of the mainland with the construction of the Rankine Generating Station upriver by 1910.

=== Construction ===
Construction began in 1961, and was reportedly the first using of the slipform construction method in North America. One minor fire occurred on the roof on September 2, 1961, due to spillage of hot-mix concrete igniting a tarp and causing several propane tanks to explode. Damage was minimal, estimated at "a few thousand dollars", and nine people suffered minor injuries battling the blaze.

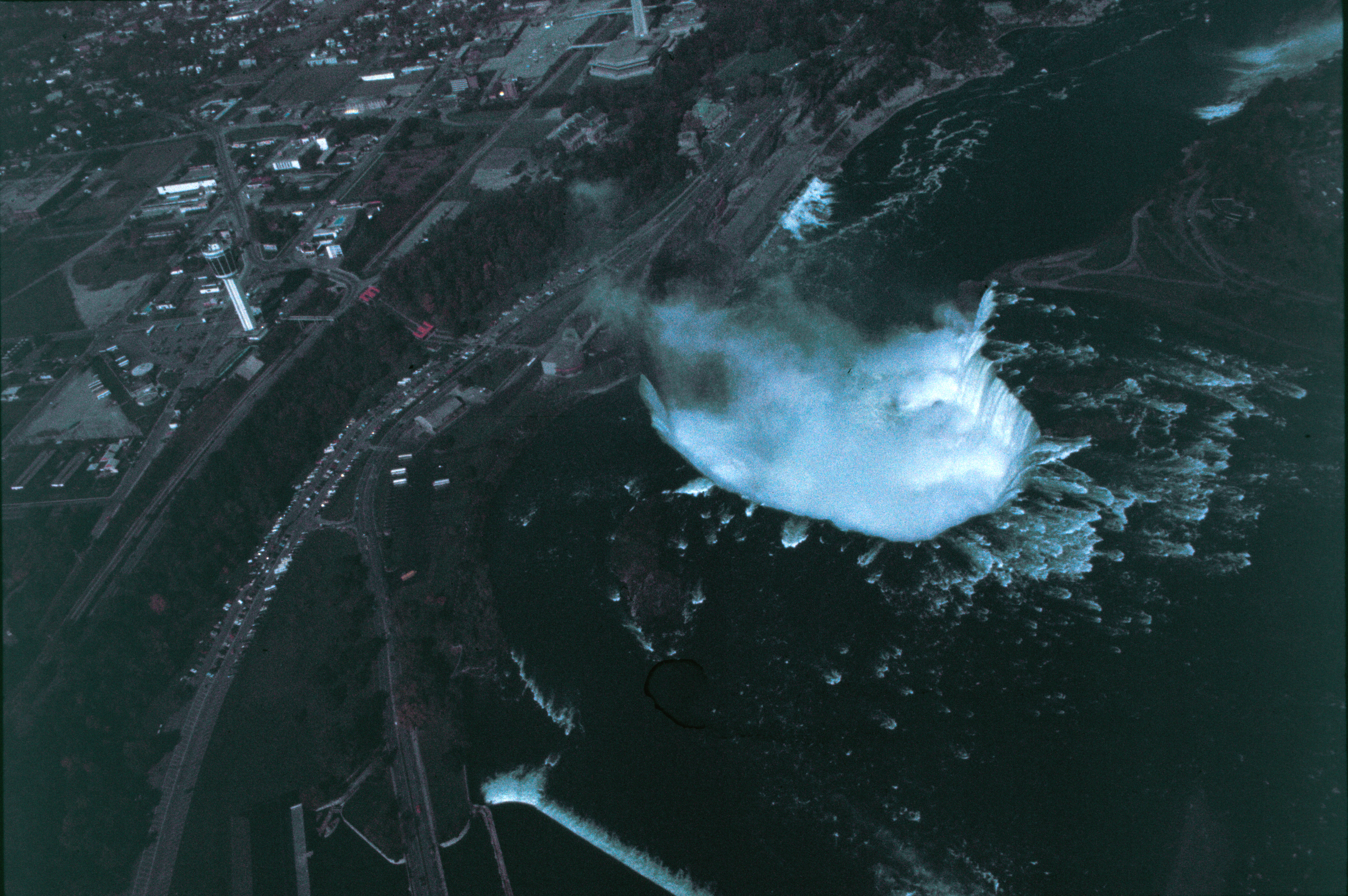
Aerial Photo featuring Tower Hotel taken 1978

The tower opened for business on July 1, 1962.

=== Changing skyline ===
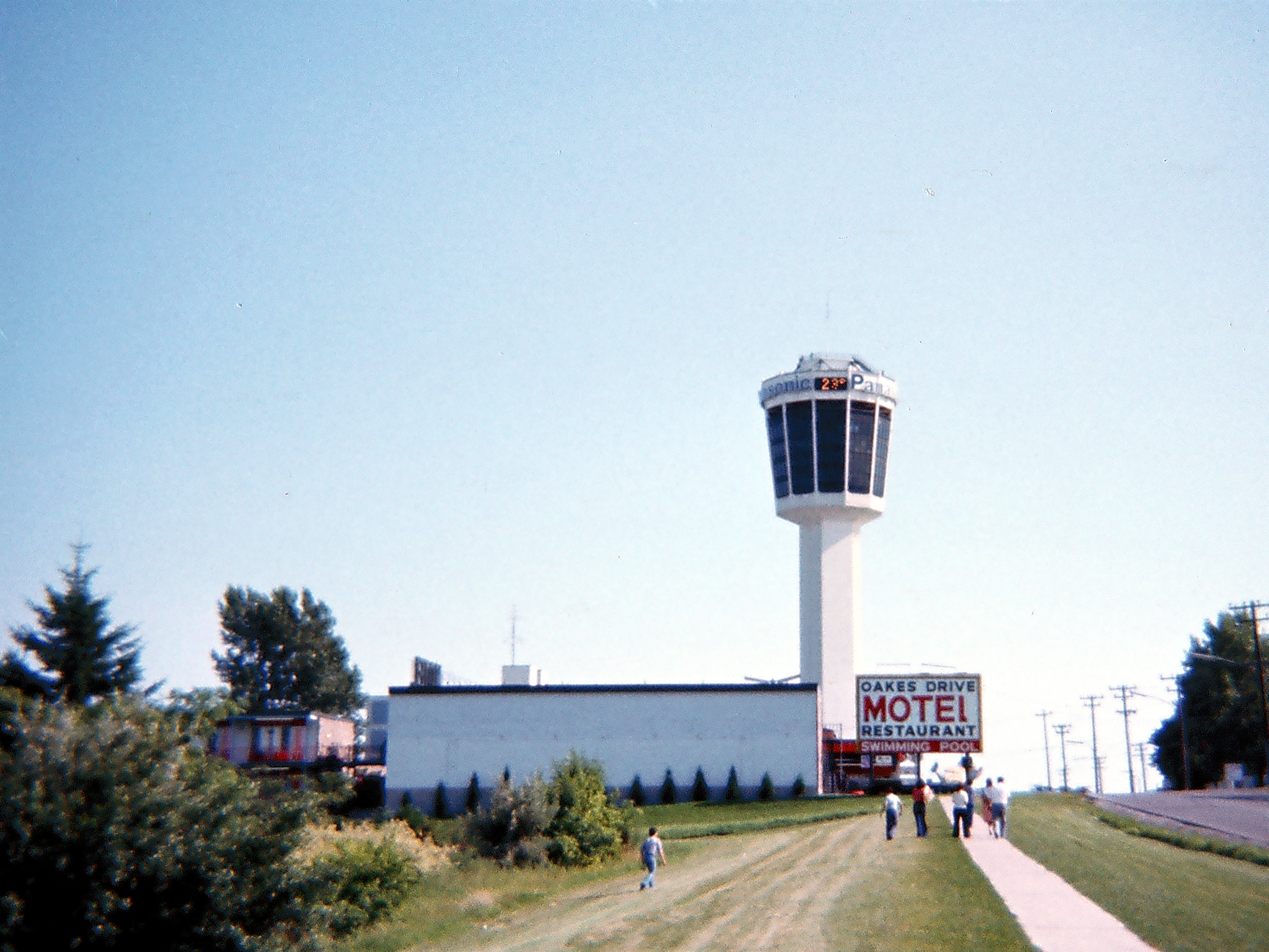
Panasonic Tower, August 1976.

When the tower and surrounding area was first designed prior to groundbreaking on March 15, 1961, it was to be the centrepiece of a proposed hotel/convention centre. Due to finances, the accompanying hotel buildings were not built, and it would be over forty years before hotels began to rise adjacent to the tower.

During the 1970s and 1980s, the surrounding land was occupied by an aquarium to the north, and the Waltzing Waters attraction to the south. The Waltzing Waters site was moved across the street in 1995 to allow for site planning of the current Marriott hotel. The Waltzing Waters, a light and water show synchronized to music, disappeared altogether by 2000. The aquarium was dismantled in 1996 to allow for further site expansion.

The 2000s boom in large hotel construction on Fallsview Boulevard, such as the Fallsview Hotel, Hilton Hotel, and Embassy Suites by Hilton, as well as the nearby Oakes Hotel and Radisson, has diminished the Tower Hotel's prominence as a landmark. All of these hotels strive to give their guests as good a view of the Falls as possible by taking advantage of their position of the height on land above the falls, once dominated solely by the Tower Hotel. In contrast, the airspace around the Skylon Tower remains fairly open, thanks to its position further down the Niagara River away from the American Falls and Horseshoe Falls.

=== Naming ===
The Tower Hotel was originally called the Seagram Tower, named after the House of Seagram business in Montreal, Quebec. Over the years, due to multiple bankruptcies and ownership changes, tower names changed between Heritage Tower (1969), Royal Inn Tower (1971), Royal Centre Tower (1972), Panasonic Tower (1973), Minolta Tower (1984), and Konica Minolta Tower Centre (2003) with the merger of Konica and Minolta in 2003. The tower underwent renovations again in 2010, resulting in its colour reverting to the original white, the banner displaying Konica Minolta being replaced by the title Tower Hotel, and the removal of the exterior clocks.

== Features ==
=== Observation deck ===
Located on the 25th floor, this deck features a panoramic view of the falls and Niagara River in addition to floor-to-ceiling windows treated with a non-glare finish designed to enhance photography. There are many historical photos and news articles about the construction of the tower mounted around the deck in addition to pay-per-use telescopes.

=== Restaurants ===
The restaurant has an International House of Pancakes location on the 26th floor, previously home to Marilyn's Bistro & Lounge, a restaurant themed after Marilyn Monroe in honour of the film, Niagara, in which she starred. The tower's original, award-winning gourmet Pinnacle Restaurant had been located there for many years.

=== Hotel ===
In 2002, the tower re-opened after extensive renovations to include the four-star Ramada Plaza Fallsview. This franchise was lost and the hotel has operated without the Ramada flag since 2011 choosing to instead go by the new name The Tower Hotel.

== See also ==
- List of towers
- Skylon Tower
- Casino Tower
