= Table Rock Welcome Centre =

Building in Niagara Falls, Ontario, Canada

Coordinates: 43.079154°N 79.078442°W

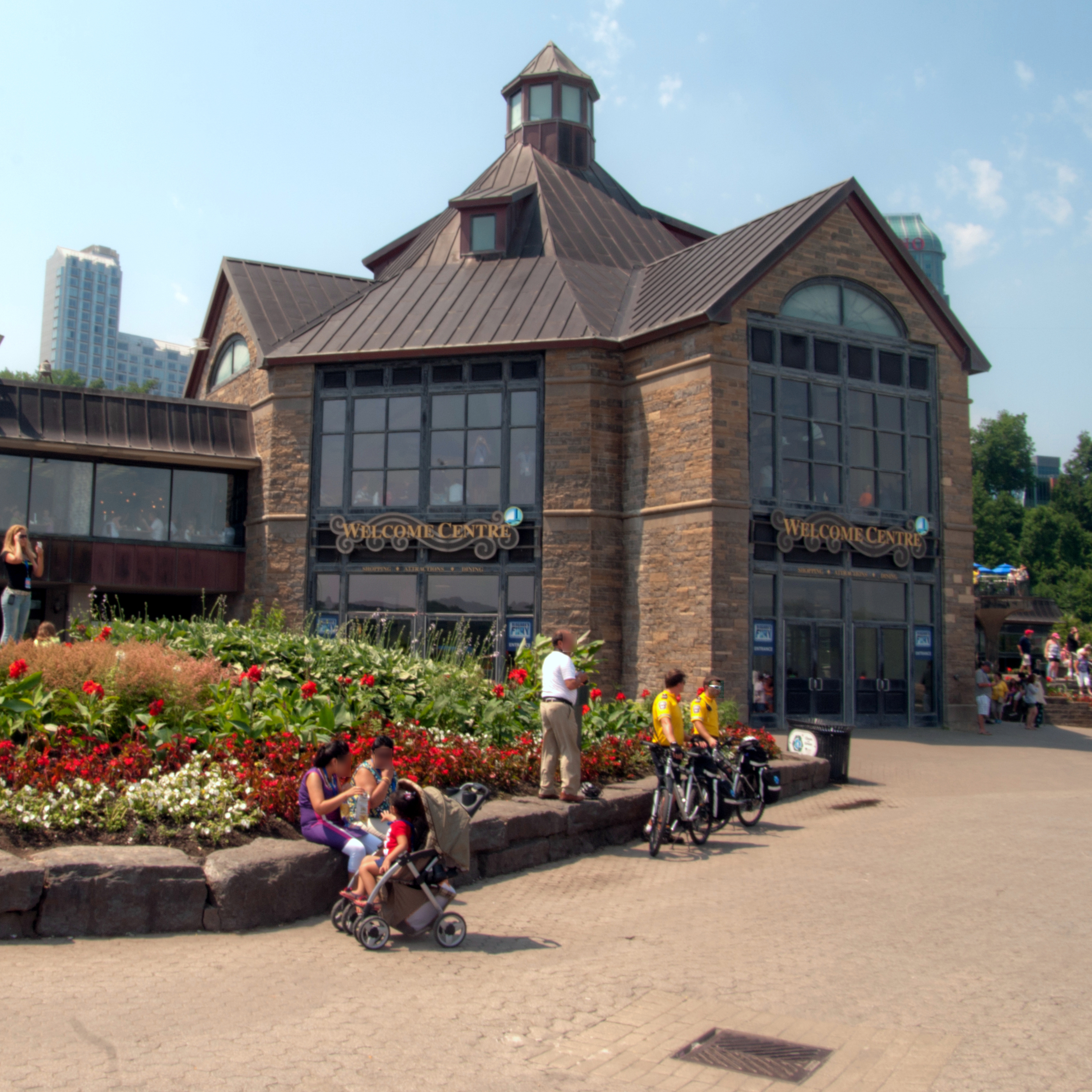
- Main entrance
- Former names: Table Rock House
- Alternative names: Table Rock Centre

General information
- Architectural style: Collegiate Gothic (north)
- Completed: 1926 (north building); 1974 (south building)
- Renovated: 2008
- Owner: Niagara Parks Commission

Design and construction
- Architecture firm: Findlay and Foulis

The Table Rock Welcome Centre (also known as Table Rock Centre and formerly as Table Rock House) is a retail and observation complex located in Niagara Falls, Ontario, Canada at the brink of the Canadian Horseshoe Falls, several hundred feet south of the former rock formation which bears its name. The complex consists of two buildings connected by an indoor pedestrian mall and anchored by "The Grand Hall", a multi-level indoor observation complex, completed in 2008.

The north building, originally constructed in 1926, houses a first-floor retail store and the Welcome Centre, plus the ticket offices for the tunnels Journey Behind the Falls attraction. The upper level contains multiple specialty stores, and an additional outdoor observation plaza. The south building, constructed in 1974, has a first-floor fast food snack bar, additional retail space, and a second-floor, semi-formal restaurant overlooking the Horseshoe Falls and the upper Niagara River.

Owned and operated by the Niagara Parks Commission, Table Rock Centre provides the best direct path from the Horseshoe Falls observation area to the Falls Incline Railway (courtesy of a new bridge constructed in 2008 spanning the Niagara Parkway), which transports passengers to the Fallsview Tourist Area above the Niagara Escarpment.

== History ==
=== Before the Niagara Parks Commission: 1827-1887 ===
The first building on the site was constructed in 1827, when Thomas Barnett established his second museum of novelties, joining his first museum further downriver at the current site of the Queen Victoria Place Restaurant. Barnett was eventually met with stiff competition from Buffalo native Saul Davis, operator of a museum on the New York side, Prospect House, who built his own structure called Table Rock House in 1853, immediately south of Barnett's original structure.

Competition for the tourist's attention and dollar were fierce. Davis had built his structure between Barnett's museum and the Table Rock viewing area, and thus was able to intercept any potential customer of Barnett's. Davis' employees were routinely referred to as "henchmen" who would lure visitors into his complex by promising them free access to the Falls, only to renege and charge outrageous fees, while physically challenging any victimized tourist who either refused or was unable to pay these charges. One such incident in June 1870 resulted in a homicide, for which Davis was acquitted and Barnett reprimanded for.

Even though victimized by Davis many times, Barnett did not resort to overcharging tourists or being disrespectful toward them. However, it was Barnett who ended up with financial difficulties. His riverfront property was auctioned off in 1877 to satisfy debts. Davis purchased Barnett's properties and continued to run the operation until the Niagara Parks Commission and Queen Victoria Park were established under a Provincial Act in 1887.

=== Under Commission jurisdiction: 1887 - present ===
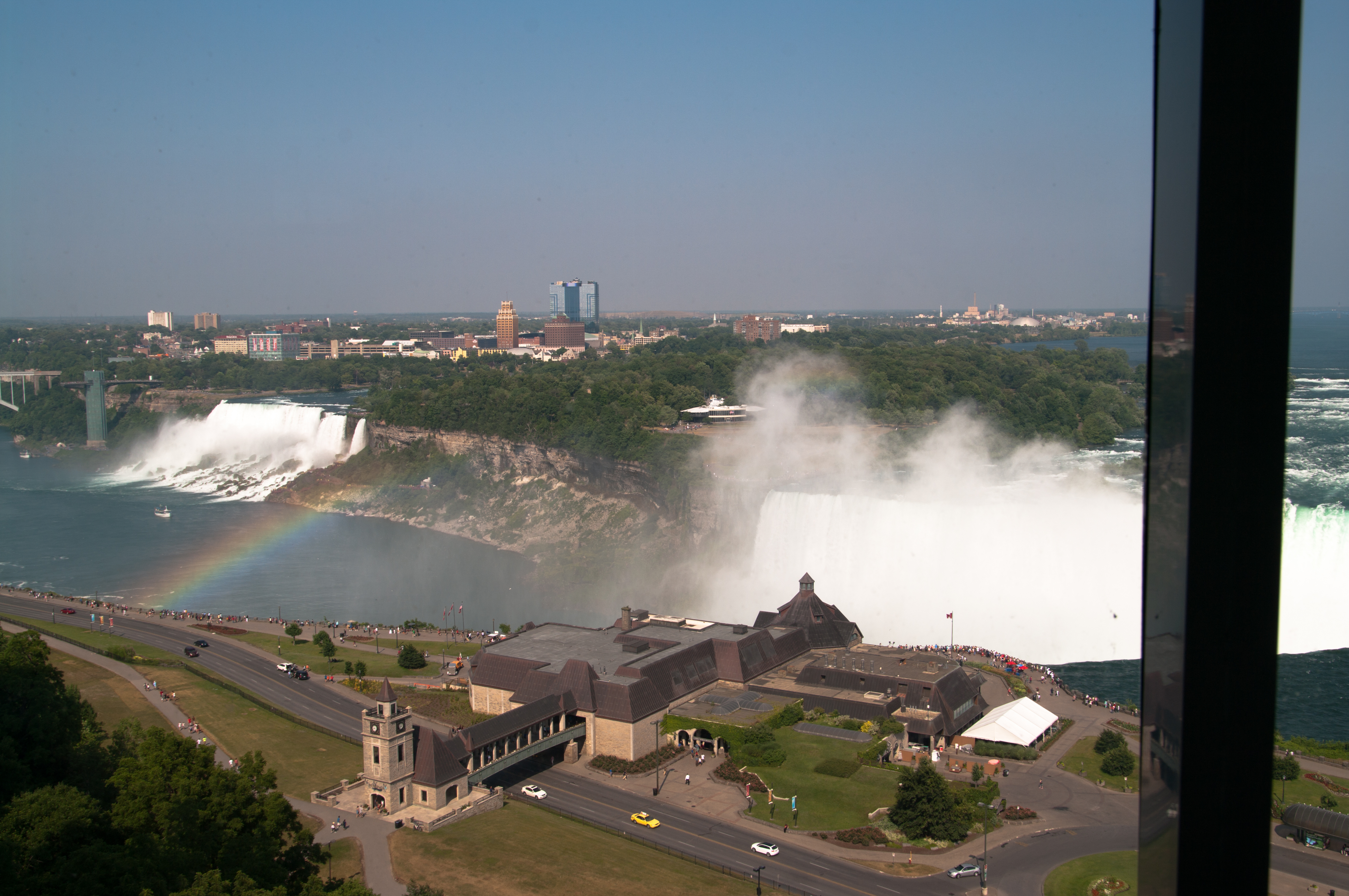
Centre from above

Since the 1840s, there had been a series of stairways leading from the complex to the river level where tourists could descend and walk right next to the foot of the Horseshoe Falls, dubbed Behind The Sheet. These stairs were replaced in 1889 with a hydraulic lift, and by 1905, tunnels were cut inside the rock, establishing the forerunner of the Journey Behind the Falls attraction.

Davis' Table Rock House, standing since 1853, was in disrepair and was finally demolished in 1925 to make way for a new road and replacement building. Designed by the firm of Findlay and Foulis (Claude Alexander Findlay and James Foulis both from Scotland) of Sault Ste. Marie, Ontario, this Collegiate Gothic building is still in service today, albeit with major modifications since that time.

After World War II, the tunnels were relined with concrete and in 1951, an observation platform was constructed just north of the Horseshoe Falls. The attraction, now called the Scenic Tunnels, continued to draw increased tourist traffic; so much so that in 1963, extensive renovations were made to Table Rock House.

Modifications included the addition of the second floor observation plaza, and a planned "permanent" exhibit of replicas of the Royal Crown Jewels of Britain, drawing over 330,000 people in its first year. This exhibit lasted until 1973 when, citing lack of visitors, it was removed. A 25 cent admission fee to the observation plaza was removed the following year. Parking for Table Rock House was originally on the river side of the building which, due to the increased use of the automobile, became a hindrance. A major road design re-routed the Niagara Parkway to the west of the building in 1973, which provided a pedestrian environment between Table Rock House and the Horseshoe Falls.

In 1974, the building known as Table Rock South or the annex, was constructed to expand retail space, including a second-floor, first-class restaurant. Renovations at the site, first begun in 1992-93, connected the two buildings and created the indoor pedestrian plaza, while the first-floor gift shop was completely renovated in the 1926 (north) building. In an effort to better describe the Scenic Tunnels attraction, it was renamed Journey Behind The Falls in the mid 1990s.

Further aesthetic improvements were made in 1998, and a more extensive renovation was completed in 2008, which saw the addition of the Grand Hall indoor observatory facing the Falls, an expansion of the north building for additional souvenir storage, as well as the new pedestrian bridge over the Niagara Parkway.

Recently renamed Table Rock Centre, the site continues to be a top draw for visitors and a top money-maker for the Niagara Parks Commission.

== In film ==
The Table Rock Centre complex was featured in the 1980 movie Superman II. Exterior shots of the 1926 (north) building established it as the fictional "Honeymoon Haven Hotel" where Clark Kent and Lois Lane represented the Daily Planet in an effort to identify corruption in the honeymoon industry (though sound stages were utilized for interior shots).
