= Skylon Tower =

Observation tower in Niagara Falls, Canada

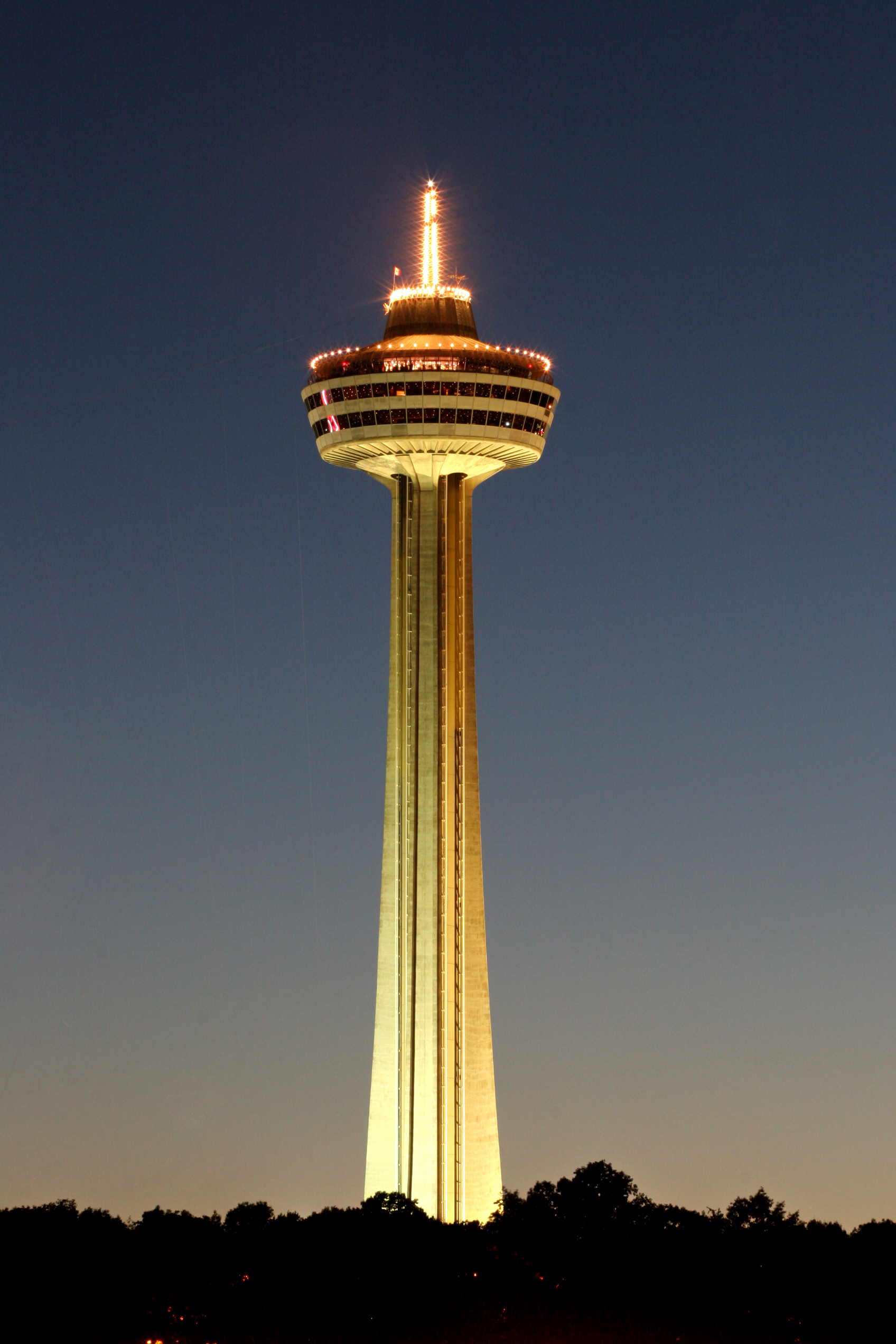
- Interactive map of the Skylon Tower area

General information
- Status: Completed
- Type: Observation tower
- Location: Niagara Falls, Ontario, Canada, 5200 Robinson Street
- Coordinates: 43°05′07″N 79°04′47″W
- Construction started: May 1964
- Completed: October 1965
- Opening: October 6, 1965
- Cost: CA$7,000,000

Height
- Architectural: 160 m (520 ft)
- Antenna spire: 11 m (36 ft)
- Roof: 149 m (489 ft)
- Top floor: 143 m (469 ft)

Technical details
- Floor count: 6
- Lifts/elevators: 3

Design and construction
- Architect: Bregman + Hamann Architects
- Main contractor: Pigott Construction Company

Other information
- Seating capacity: Revolving Dining Room: 276, Summit Suite: 180

The Skylon Tower is an observation tower in Niagara Falls, Ontario, Canada. It overlooks the American Falls, Horseshoe Falls and Niagara River.

== History ==
Construction of the Skylon began in May 1964. The tower was opened on October 6, 1965, by New York Governor Nelson Rockefeller and Ontario Premier John Robarts. Costing $7 million at the time of its construction, the Skylon Tower was owned by a private partnership called Niagara International Centre, which was financed by Hershey Foods shareholdings of Charles Richard Reese, former co-owner of the H. B. Reese Candy Company of Hershey, Pennsylvania. Canadian Pacific Hotels (CPH) was hired to operate the tower restaurants and lounges.

On October 1, 1975, CPH purchased the tower from Reese and his partners for $11 million. The tower's summit features a verdigris-green copper roof similar to CPH's other properties, including the Château Frontenac in Quebec City and the Banff Springs Hotel in Banff, Alberta. CPH owned and operated the tower until 1986, when it was sold for $18 million to two local Niagara hotel owners, John Gruyich of Michael's Inn and George Yerich of the Holiday Inn by the Falls Motel. In 1988, George Yerich bought out John Gruyich's ownership share of the Skylon for $13 million; however, Milicent Gruyich continues to own the land the tower is built on. Yerich's Skylon land lease will expire in 2060, at which time the Skylon Tower will revert to total ownership by the heirs of Milicent Gruyich.

While much redevelopment has taken place in the surrounding city, the Skylon Tower complex still retains much of its look and feel from the 1970s and 1980s. However the property has recently been expanded to include a 3D/4D theatre, a Starbucks franchise, other quick-service franchises and a bridge connecting the complex with the newly completed Fallsview Casino. In August and September 2008 the roof of the Skylon was restored to its original bright copper colour.

The Skylon Tower is now illuminated using 12 RGB wash fixtures and projectors along with 3 image projectors.

== Features ==
Standing at 160 metres (520 ft) from street level and 236 metres (775 ft) from the bottom of the falls, the tower required approval from both Canadian and United States air transport authorities, due to its proximity to the international boundary. It was the second tower to be built using the slipform method, in which concrete is continuously poured into a form moving slowly up the tower. It was built by Pigott Construction of Hamilton, Ontario. The same methods were also used to build the Inco Superstack in Sudbury, and the CN Tower in Toronto.

The tower features three outside-mounted "Yellow Bug" elevators. At the time of their construction, they were the first such elevators in Canada. They were designed, engineered and maintained by a division of the Otis Elevator Company from Hamilton, Ontario and can carry passengers to the top of the tower in 52 seconds. Unlike conventional elevators that are guided by side rails, the Skylon elevators operate with a guide rail on the backside only. Special equipment is employed to prevent the cables from becoming tangled in the wind or impeded by snow and ice in the winter. A curtain wall on the outside of the tower behind each elevator protects the counterweight and travelling cables from the elements.

The tower has two restaurants at its top, the Revolving Dining Room and the upper Summit Suite Buffet. The Revolving Dining Room seats 276 people and revolves once every hour by resting on a circular rail that is propelled by a 3 horsepower (2.2 kW) motor. An observation deck sits at the tower's summit. The base of the tower features a number of gift shops, and fast food restaurants. A floor for conventions is also available, but is seldom utilized.

The base of the tower also features a family entertainment centre. Historically, the arcade has featured a large number of Sega arcade games, some of which still in operation (including a "Super Deluxe" Galaxy Force II machine). In the past, the area contained an indoor amusement park with rides such as a Ferris wheel, carousel, and Sega's R360 motion simulator.

== Gallery ==
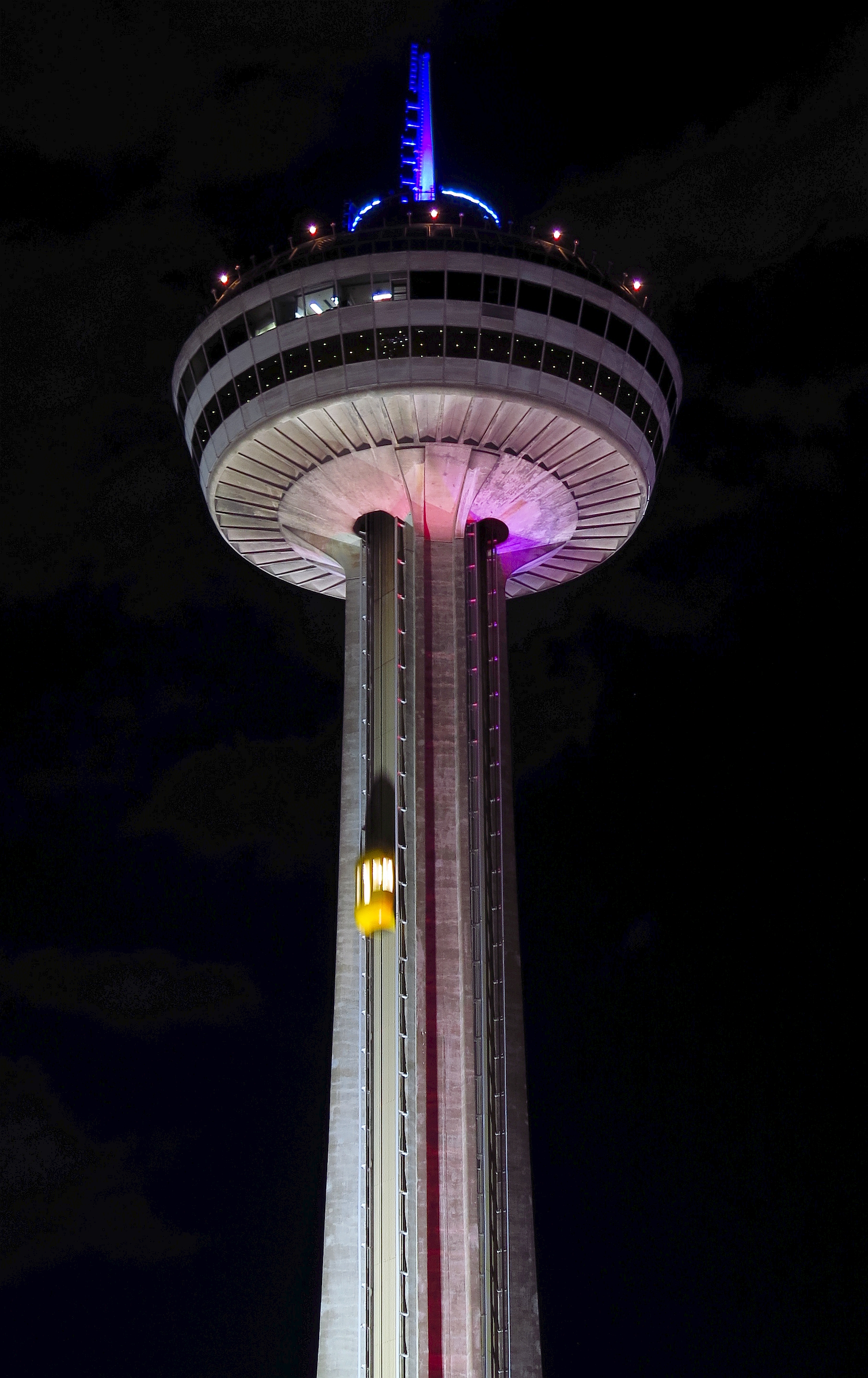
Elevator

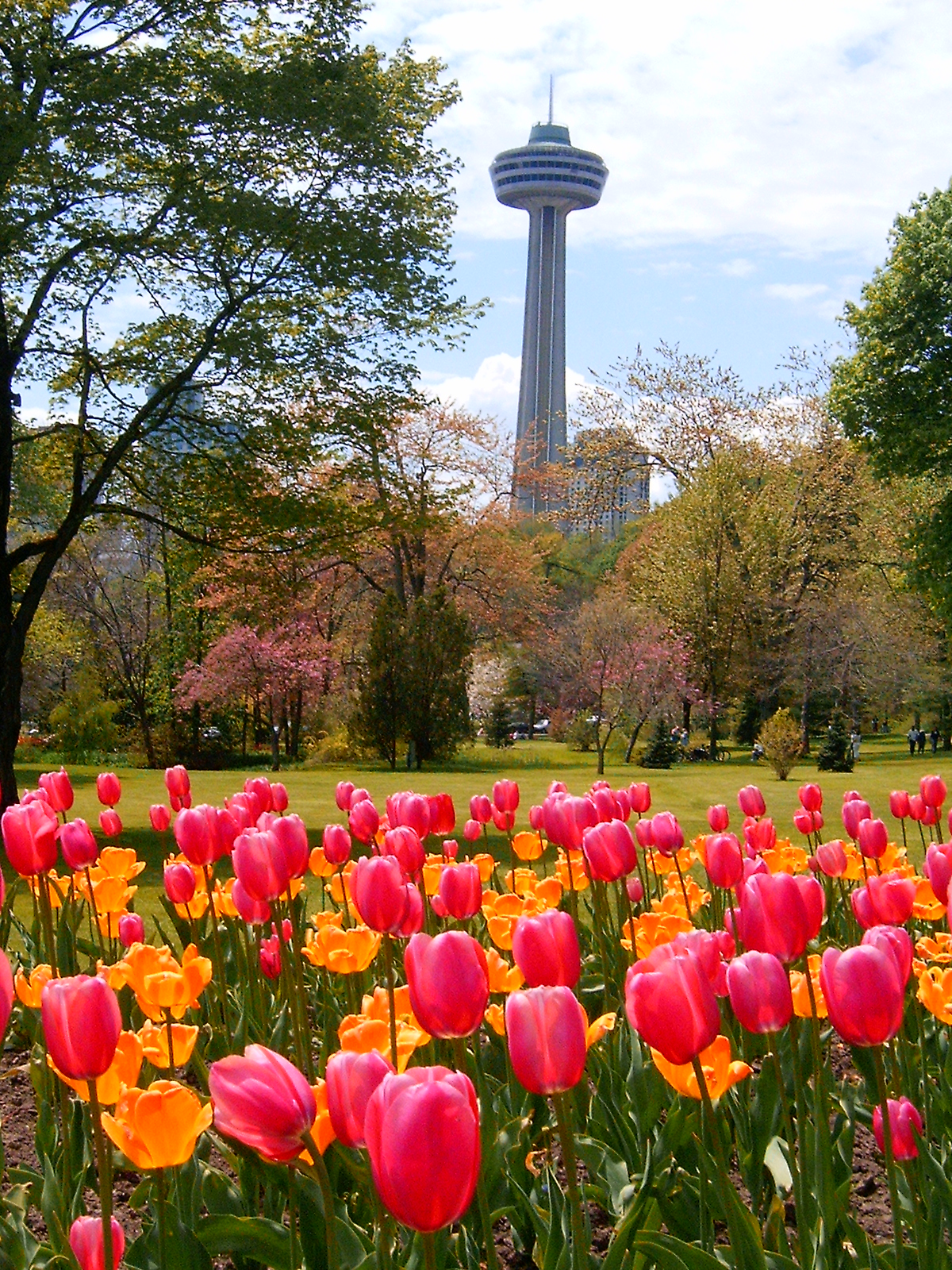
View of the tower from Panoramic Parkway during the blooming of the tulips in springtime.

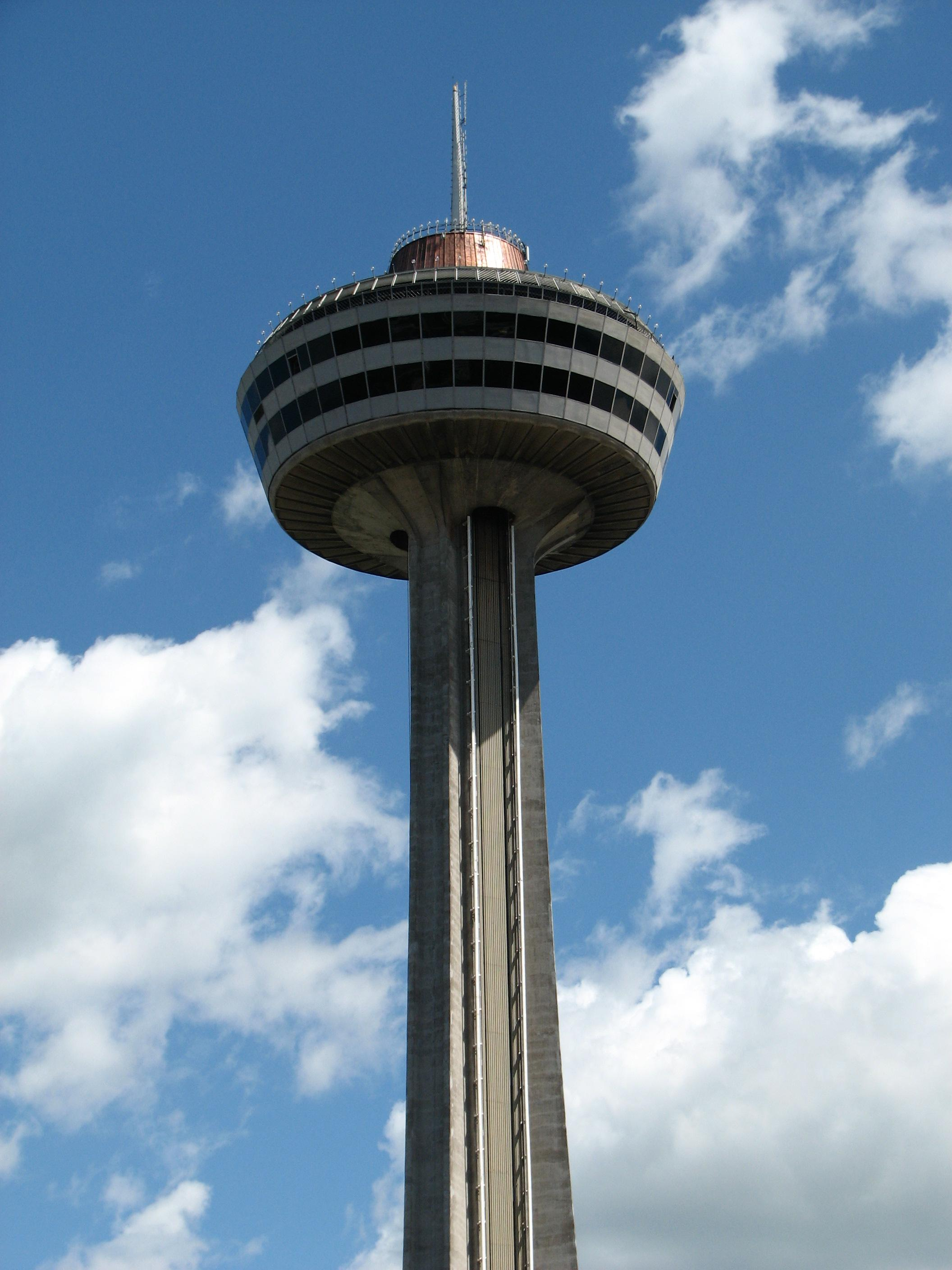
A view of the upper portion of the tower with dome newly polished back to its original copper.

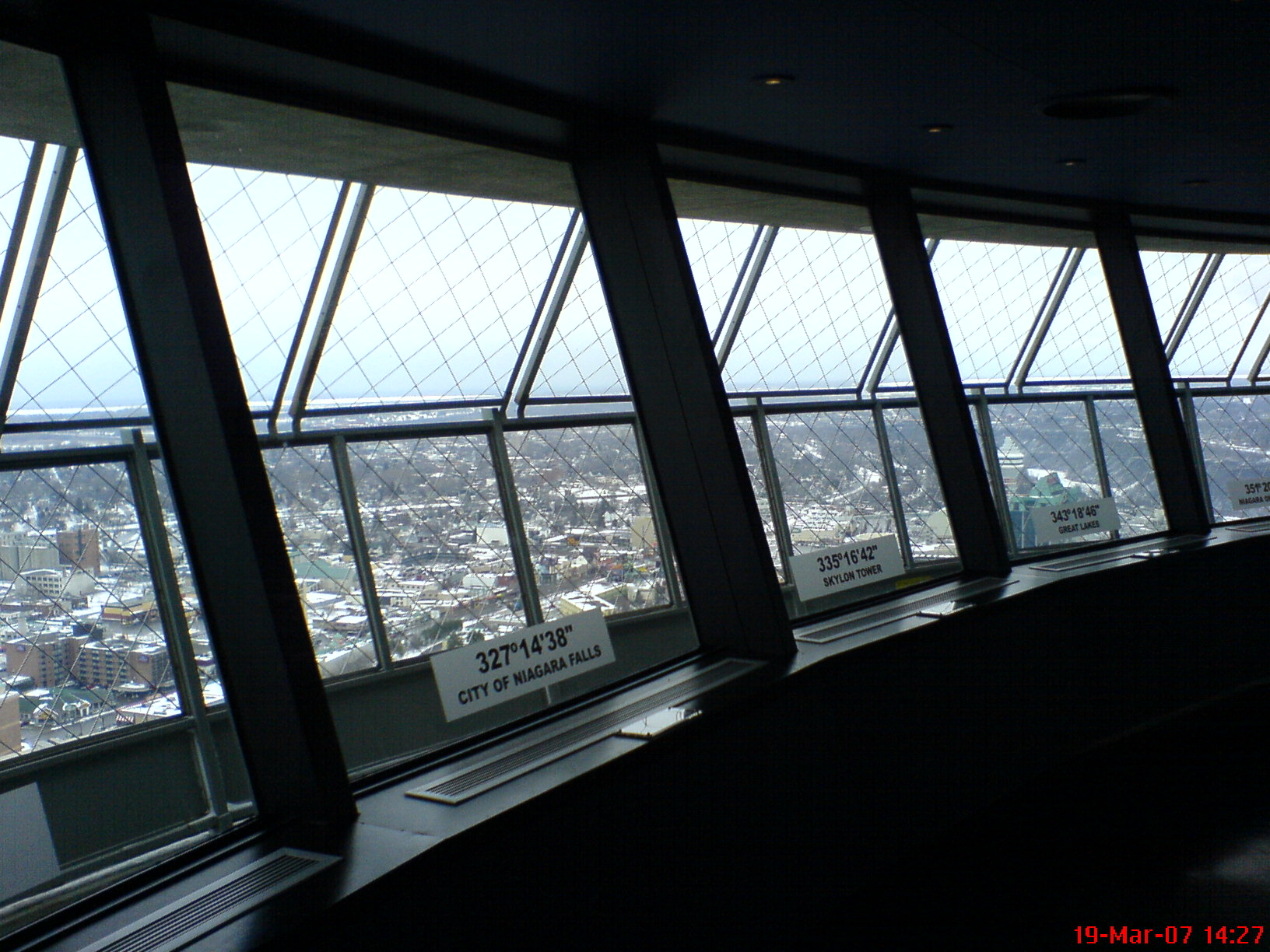
Observation deck.

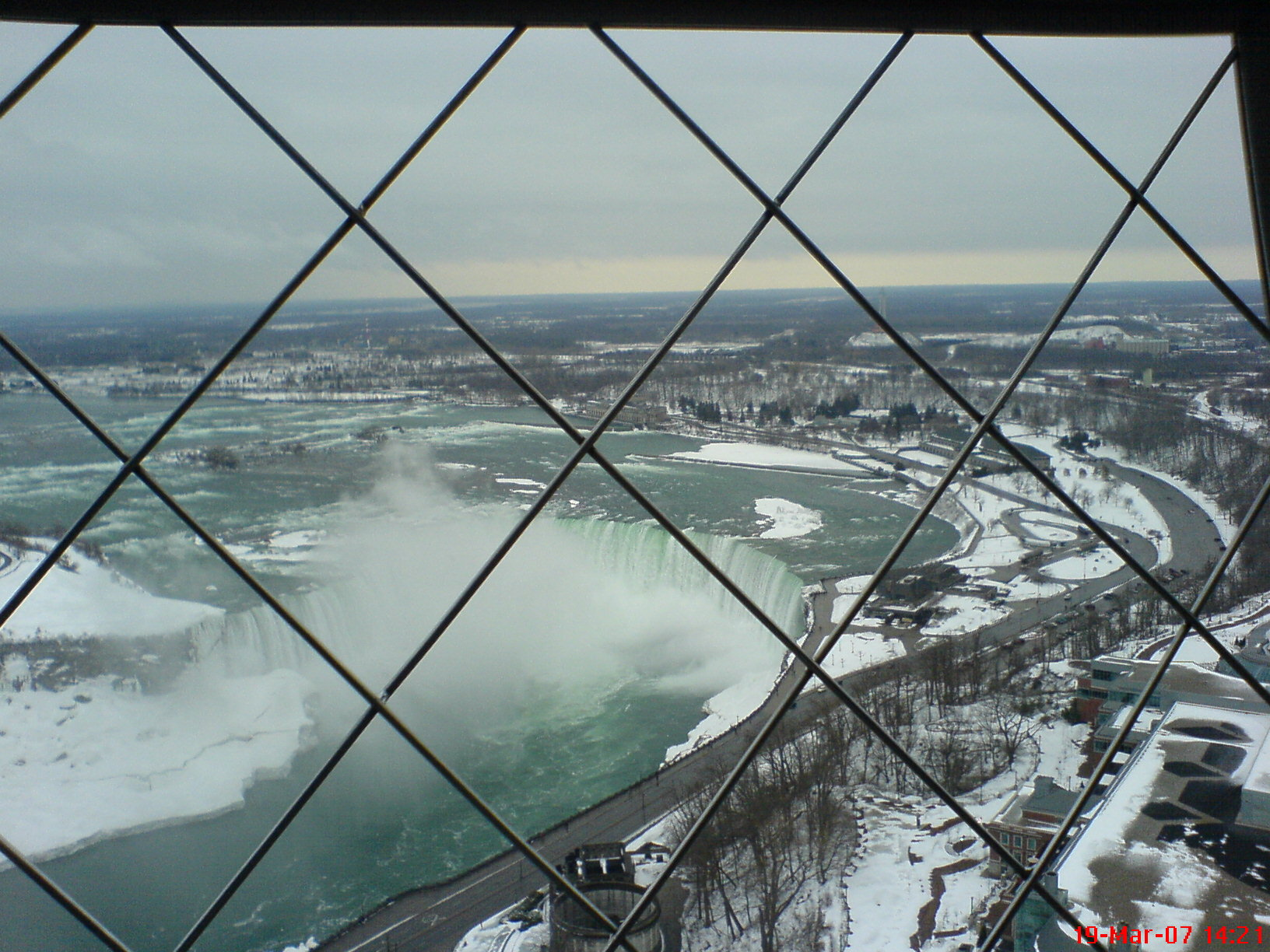
View from the outer observation deck.

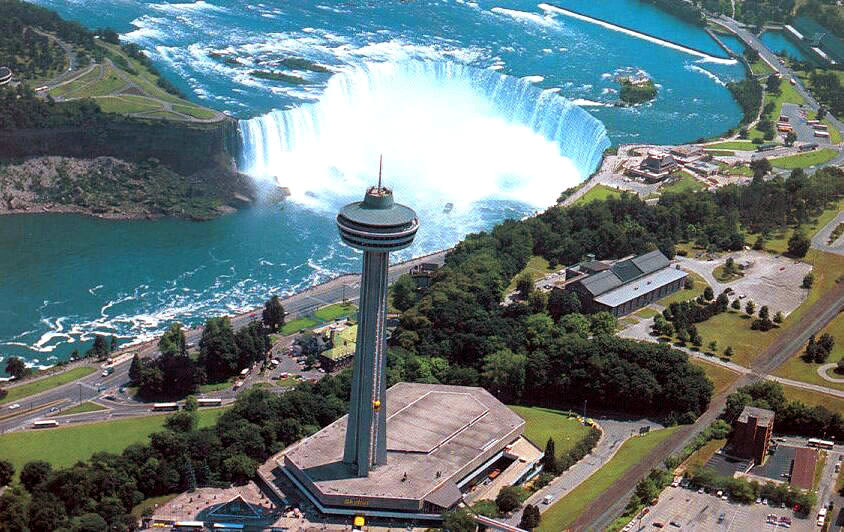
Skylon Tower as seen from a helicopter.

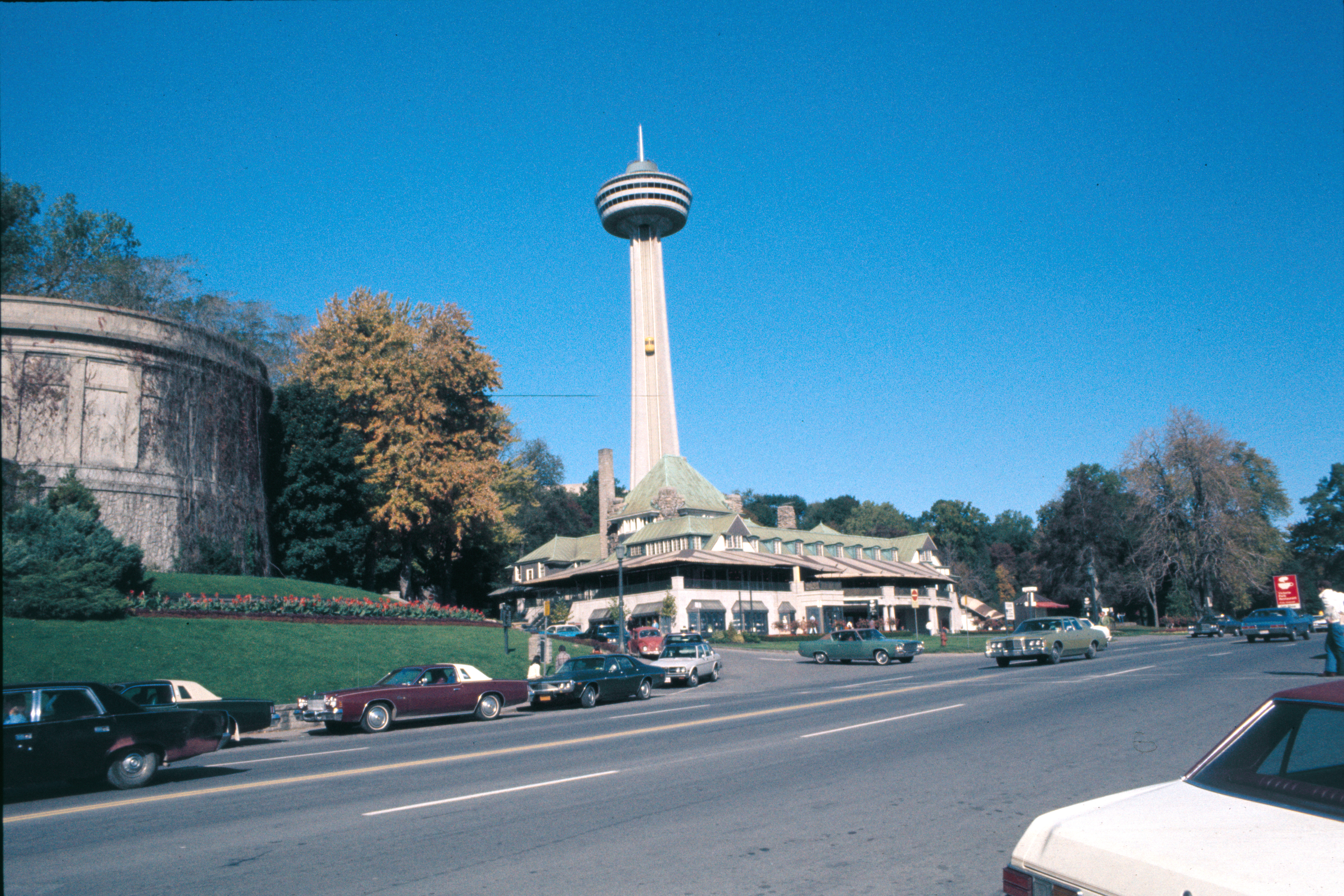
Skylon Tower in 1978

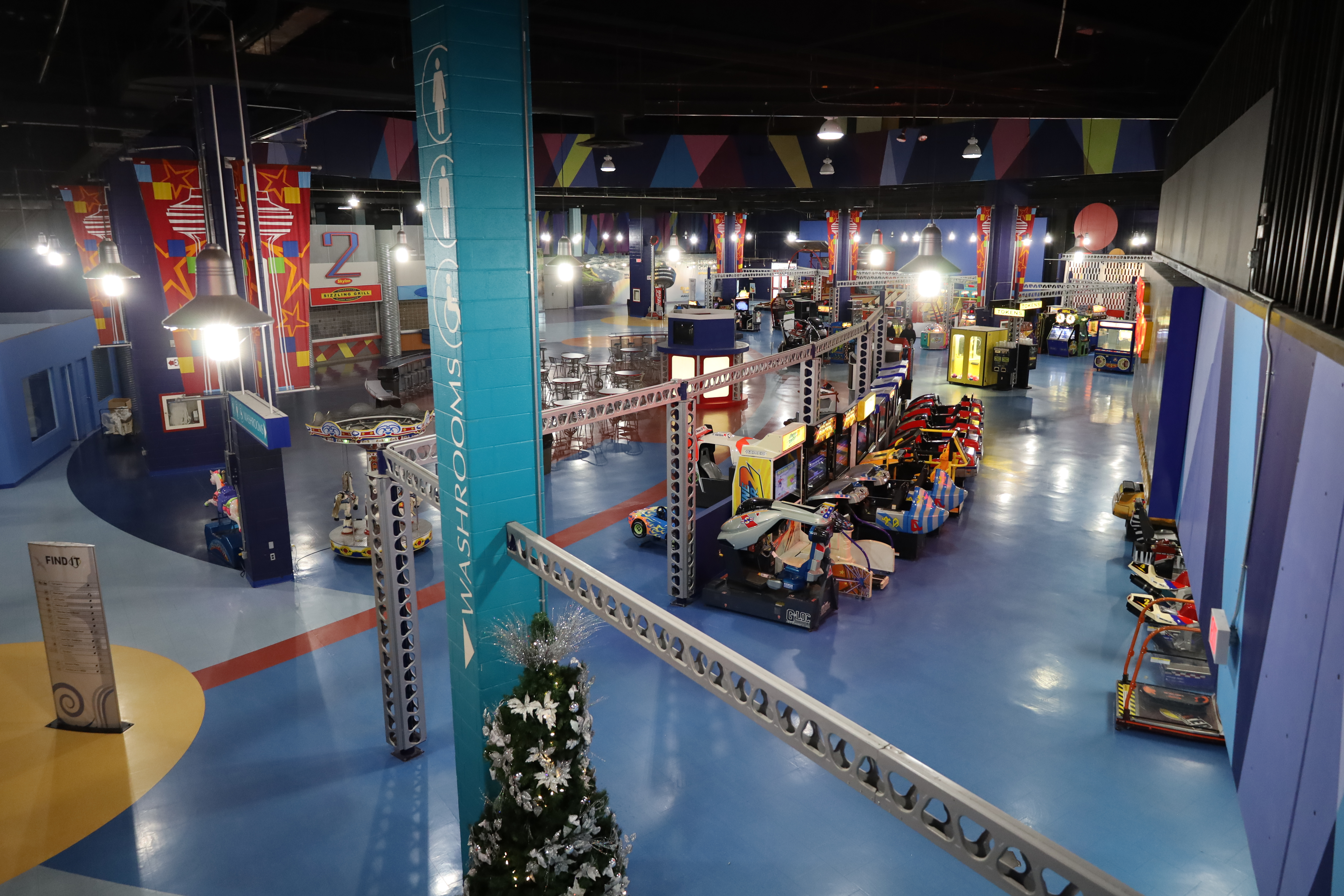
Skylon Family Fun Centre

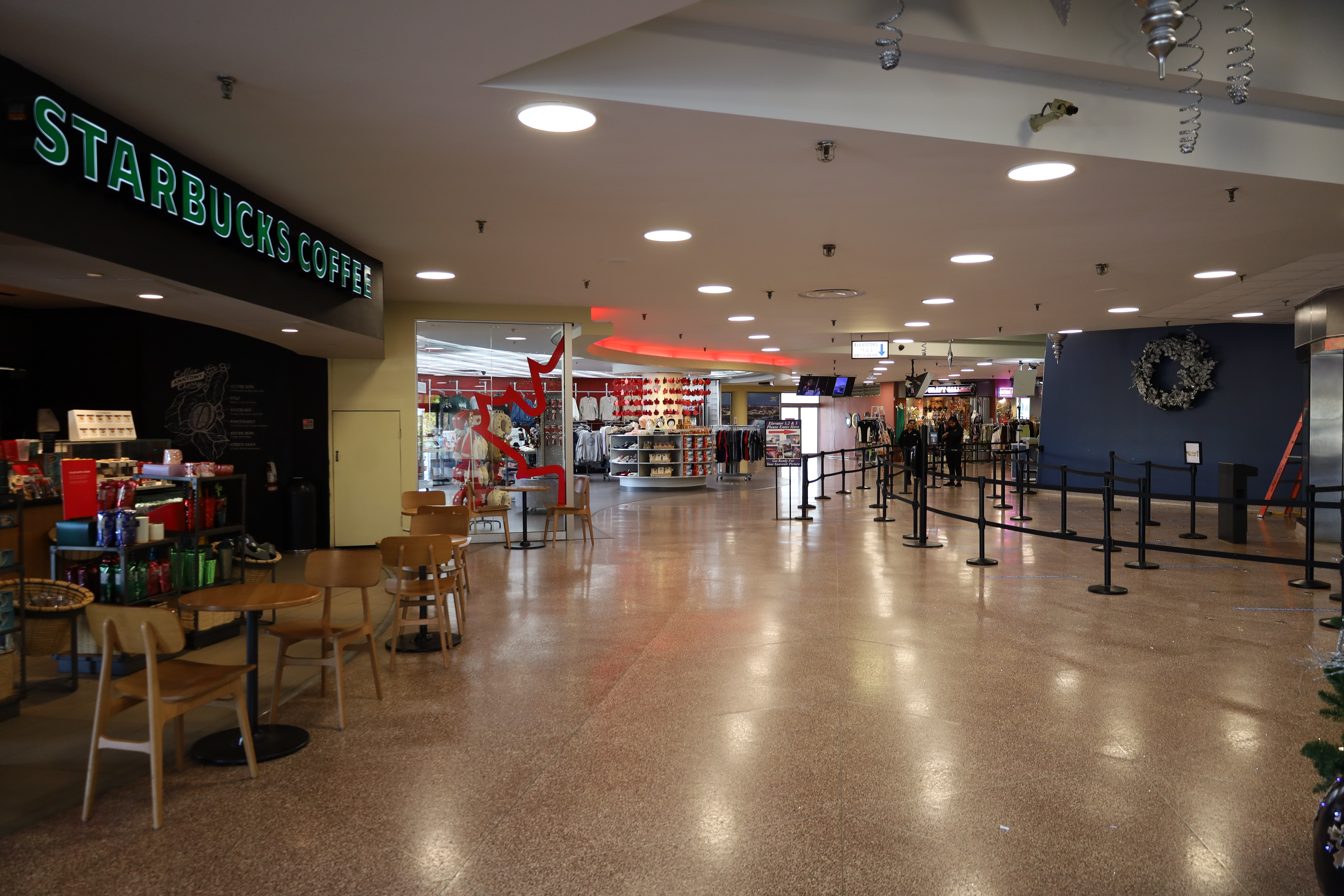
Shops at street level

== See also ==
- Calgary Tower, a tower in Calgary, Alberta designed similarly to the Skylon Tower
- Casino Niagara
- Clifton Hill
- Fallsview Casino
- List of towers
- Maid of the Mist
- Maple Leaf Village
- Spanish Aerocar
- Tower Hotel (Niagara Falls), formerly the Konica Minolta Tower Centre
