= Journey Behind the Falls =

Attraction in Niagara Falls, Ontario, Canada

Coordinates: 43.079154°N 79.078442°W

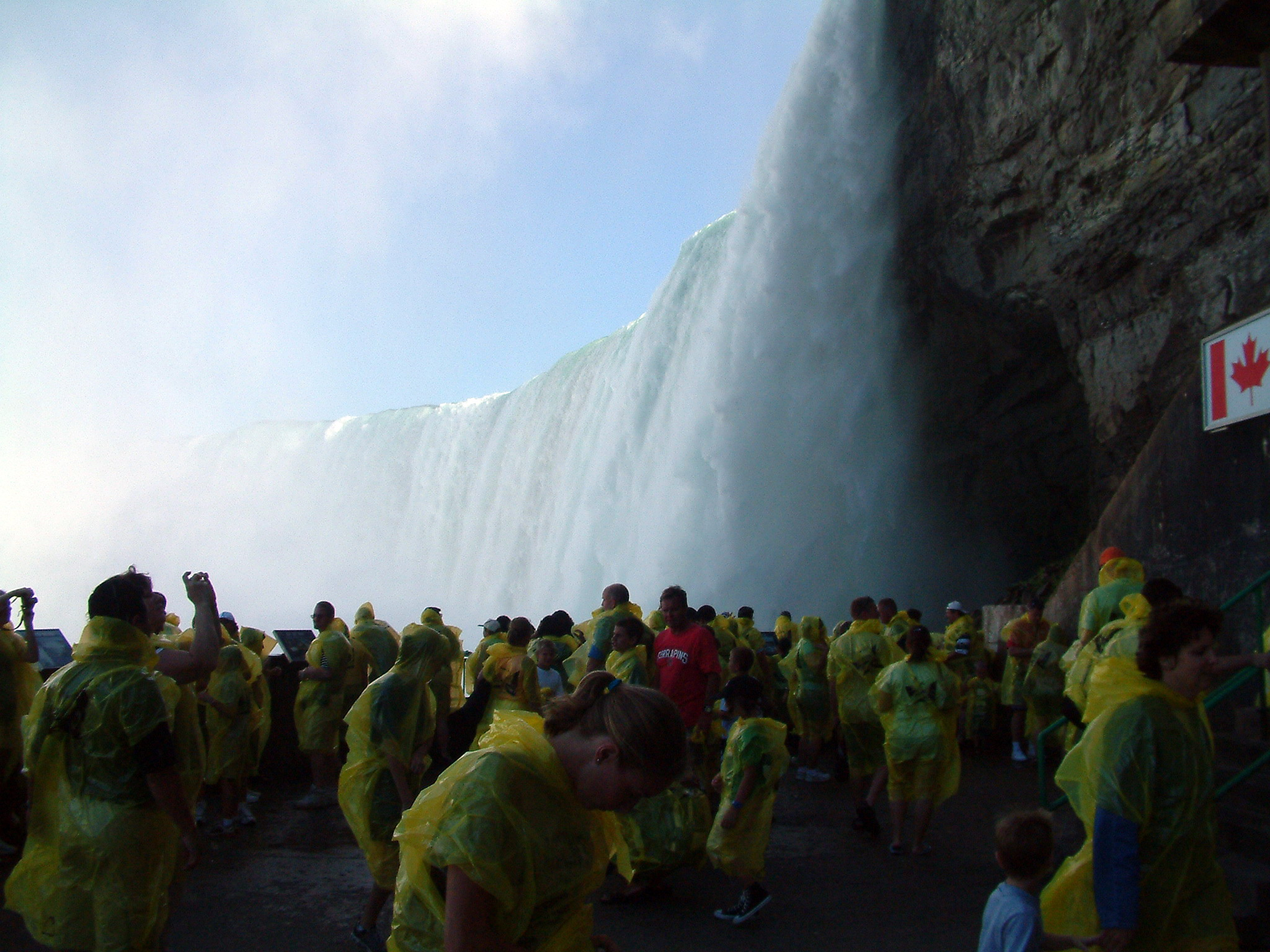
The observation platform of the Journey Behind the Falls

Journey Behind the Falls (known until the early 1990s as the Scenic Tunnels) is an attraction in Niagara Falls, Ontario, Canada located in the Table Rock Centre beside the Canadian Horseshoe Falls. It is open year round and run by the Niagara Parks Commission.

== Summary ==
The waterfall from the tunnel

Journey consists of an observation platform and series of tunnels near the bottom of the Horseshoe Falls on the Canadian shore of the Niagara River. The tunnels and platform can be reached by elevators from the street level entrance. The tour is unguided.

The two tunnels extend approximately 46 metres (151 ft) behind the waterfall and allow visitors to view water cascading in front of the open cave entrances. The tunnels are approximately 2.4 metres wide (8 ft) and 2 metres tall (7 ft).

Earlier in the attraction's history, visitors were permitted far closer to the portals' edge. However, the ongoing erosion of the gorge left these areas with insufficient rock remaining on the sides, and new tunnels were built further back. Barricades now exist further back from the ledge at the end of the tunnels to ensure visitor safety.

The observation deck provides a vantage point looking up with the falls to the right, allowing photographers a full view of the famous landmark. The deck is sprayed with water from the cascade so visitors are provided with plastic raincoats prior to their descent.

== History ==
The first tunnels opened in May 1889. Guides would carry lanterns to illuminate the passage. Eventually erosion required that the original tunnel needed to be abandoned, so in 1944 new tunnels were built further back from the edge and lined with concrete. These tunnels are lit with electric lights. An additional lower viewing platform was built in 1951. In 1994, the Niagara Parks Commission changed the name of the Scenic Tunnels to Journey Behind the Falls to provide a more accurate description of the view that awaited tourists.

The Niagara Parks Commission launched a refreshed visitor experience at Journey Behind the Falls in 2023 that features significant renovations and new exhibits in the visitor queuing areas.

== Gallery ==
The waterfall from the Observation Platform

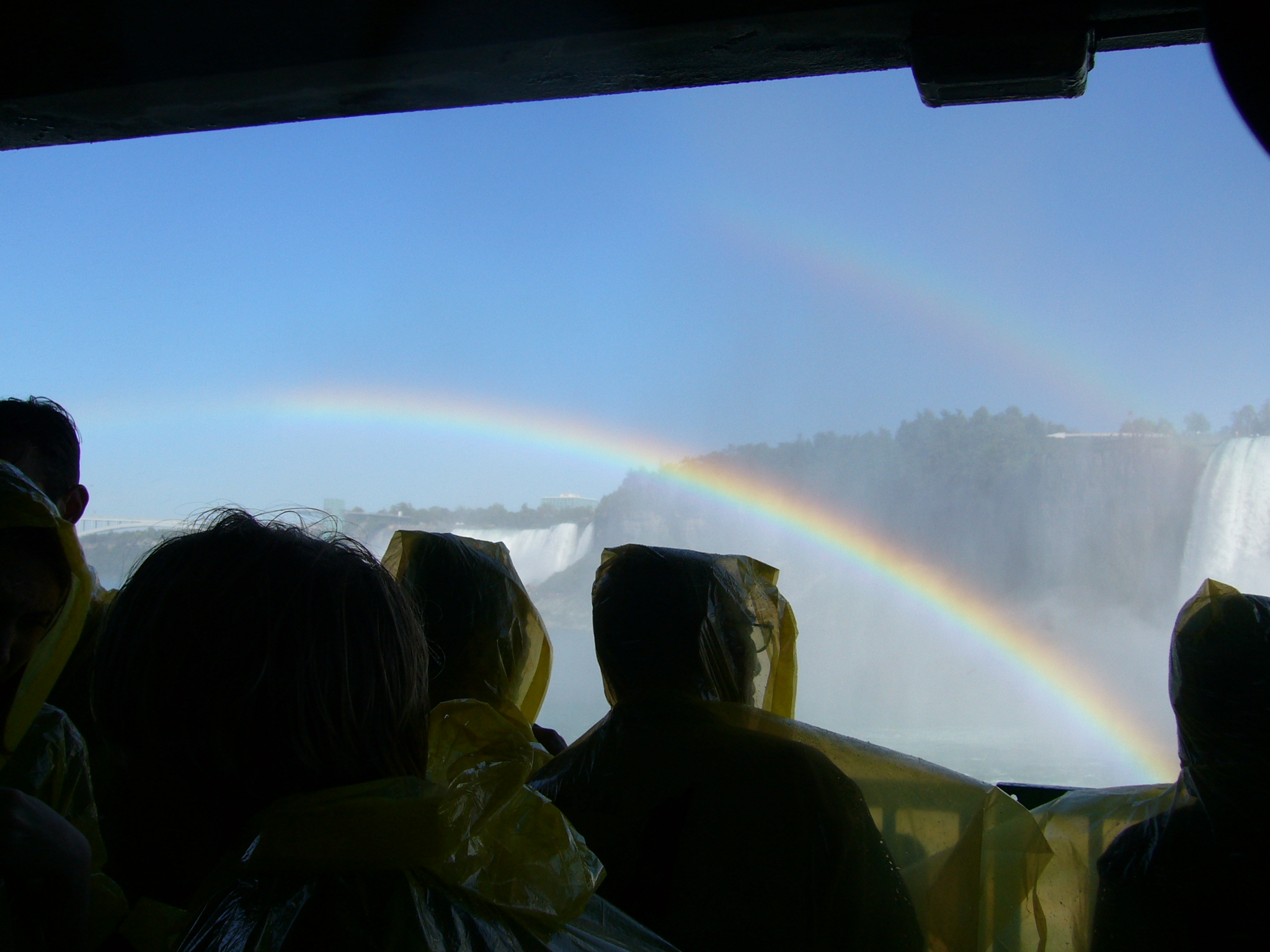
Crowd enjoying the sight of rainbows

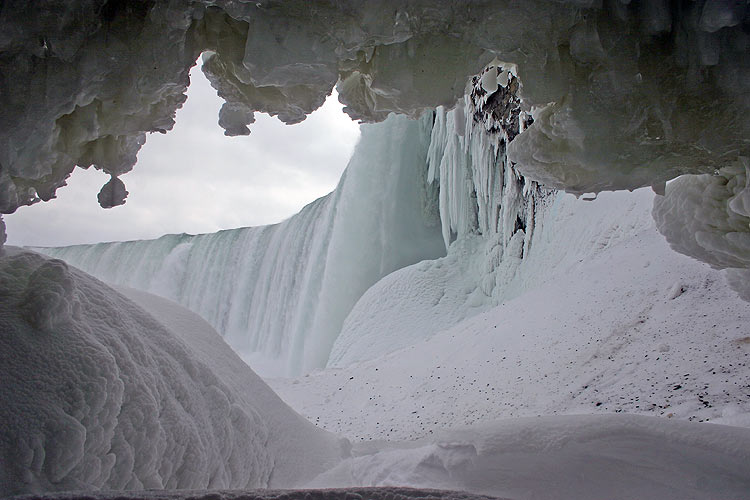
View from Table Rock

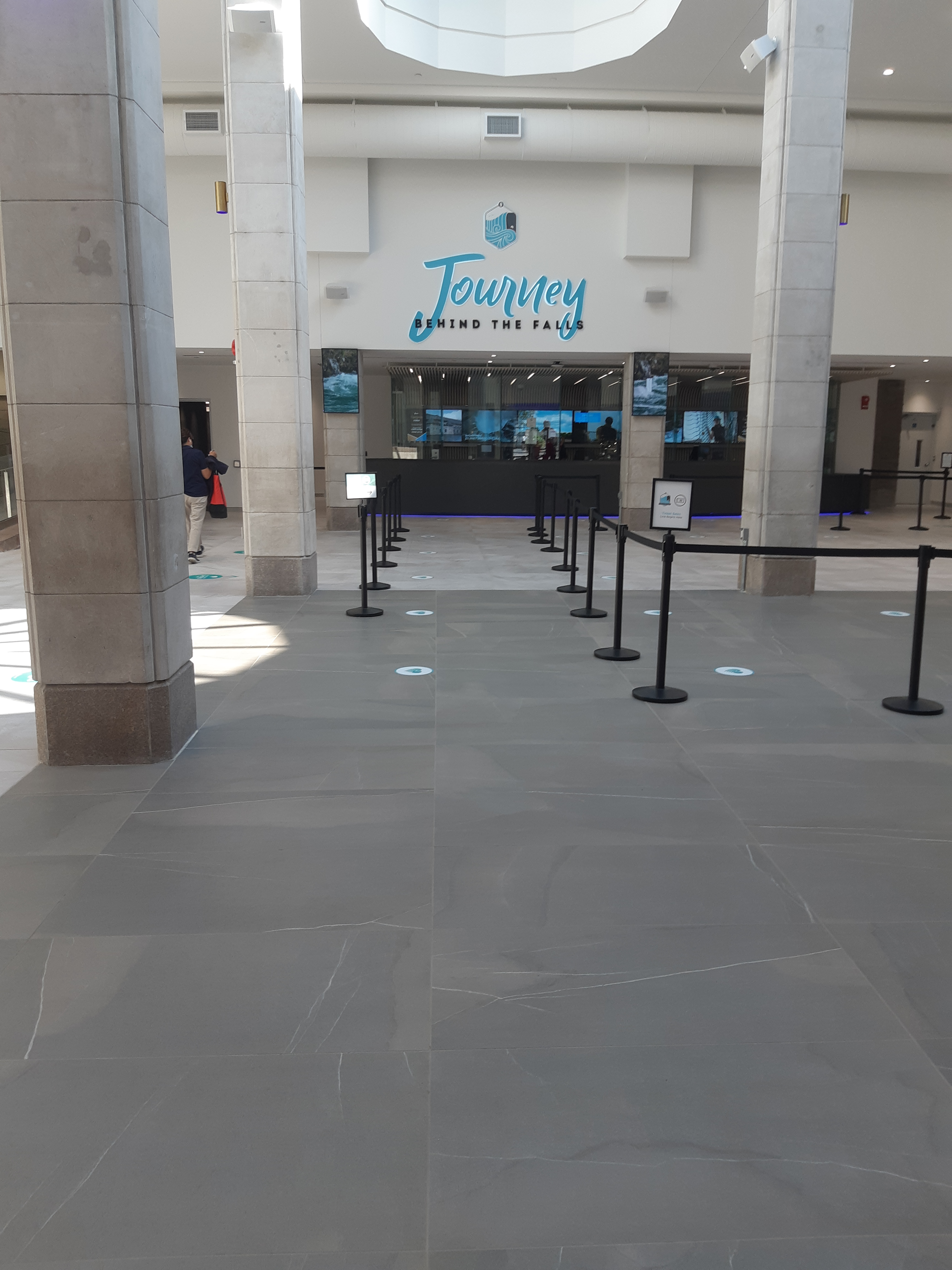
The entrance to Journey Behind the Falls, located inside the table Rock building. Here, tourists can purchase tickets as well as line up for the attraction.

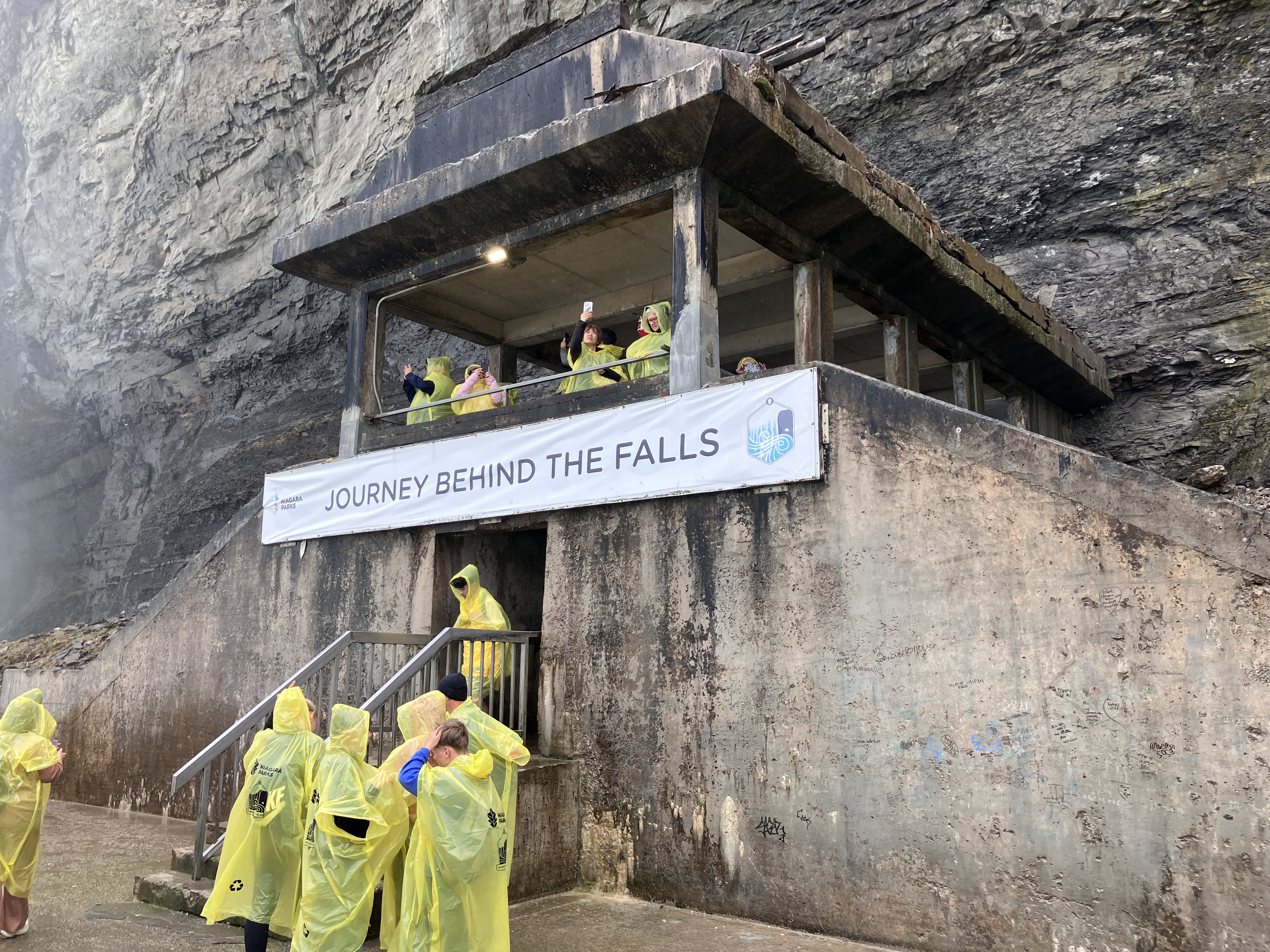
The observation deck
