= Table Rock, Niagara Falls =

Former rock formation

Coordinates: 43.079154°N 79.078442°W

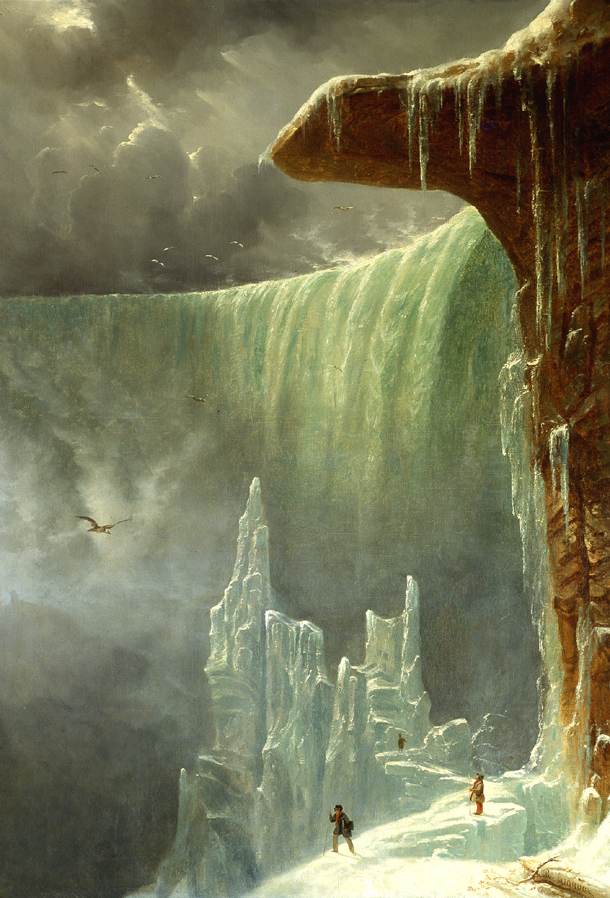
Niagara, The Table Rock in Winter by Régis François Gignoux, ca. 1847

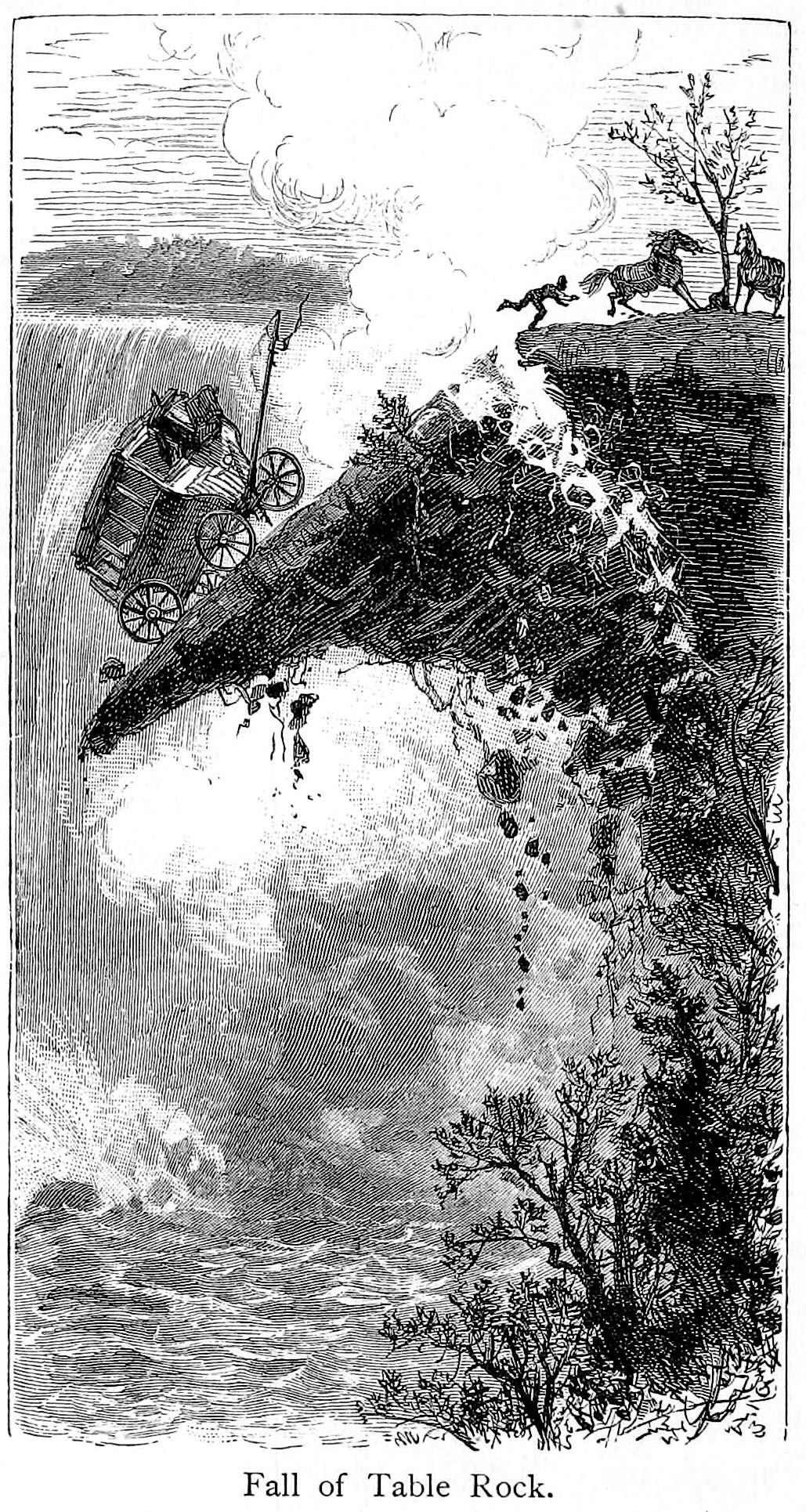
Illustration of the 1850 fall of Table Rock

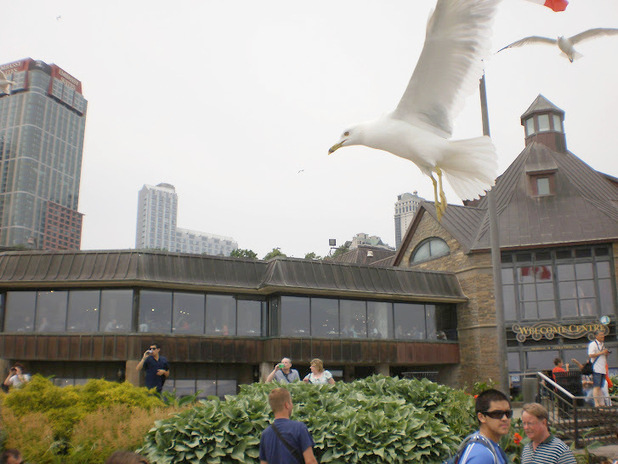
Niagara Falls, Table rock area, 2012, (Canada side)

Table Rock was a large shelf of rock that jutted out from the Canadian shore of Niagara Falls, Ontario, just north of the present day observation and commercial complex. Revealed in the mid-18th century as the Horseshoe Falls receded, Table Rock was the first major vantage point for tourists of the early and mid-19th century.

In 1818, the first part of the rock collapsed, followed by minor rockfalls in 1828 and 1829. The most notable rockfall occurred in July 1850, when roughly one-third of the point collapsed into the Niagara Gorge. A driver was washing his carriage on the point when the rock structure gave way. The man escaped, but the carriage was destroyed.

Further rockfalls occurred in 1853, 1876 and 1897. For safety purposes (with the Ontario Powerhouse directly in the gorge below), the remaining rock was blasted in 1935.

Table Rock is a popular stop for tourists. During the winter months, the site's proximity to the mists from Niagara Falls causes the shelf and surrounding areas to be covered by a thin sheath of ice, which has been captured by many photographers.

The Table Rock Welcome Centre is located on Niagara Parkway and is linked to the higher Fallsview Tourist Area by the Falls Incline Railway.

All three present day We Go Tourist bus lines (red, green, and blue) all run through the bus platforms at Table Rock.
