= Horseshoe Falls =

Largest portion of Niagara Falls on the United States–Canada border

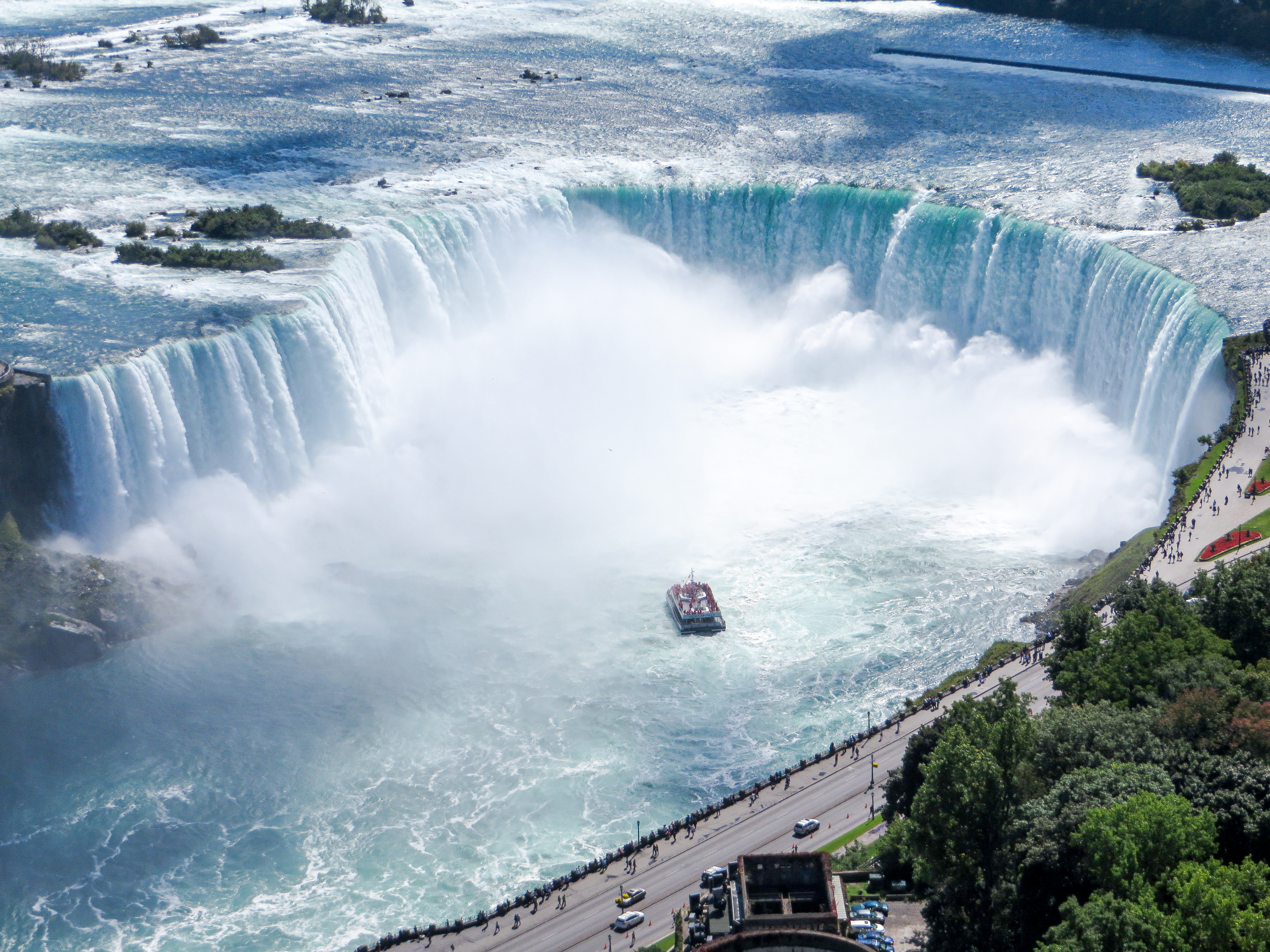
- Interactive map of Horseshoe Falls
- Location: Border of Ontario, Canada, and New York, United States. Canada to the right in the photo and to the left in the map view.
- Coordinates: 43°04′38″N 79°04′32″W
- Type: Cataract
- Total height: 167 ft (51 m)
- Total width: 2,700 ft (820 m)
- Watercourse: Niagara River

Horseshoe Falls is the largest of the three waterfalls that collectively form Niagara Falls on the Niagara River along the Canada–United States border. Approximately 90% of the Niagara River, after around half the water (75% at night and in winter) is diverted for hydropower generation, flows over Horseshoe Falls. The remaining 10% flows over American Falls and Bridal Veil Falls. It is located between Terrapin Point on Goat Island in the US state of New York, and Table Rock in the Canadian province of Ontario. These falls are also referred to as the Canadian Falls.

== International border ==
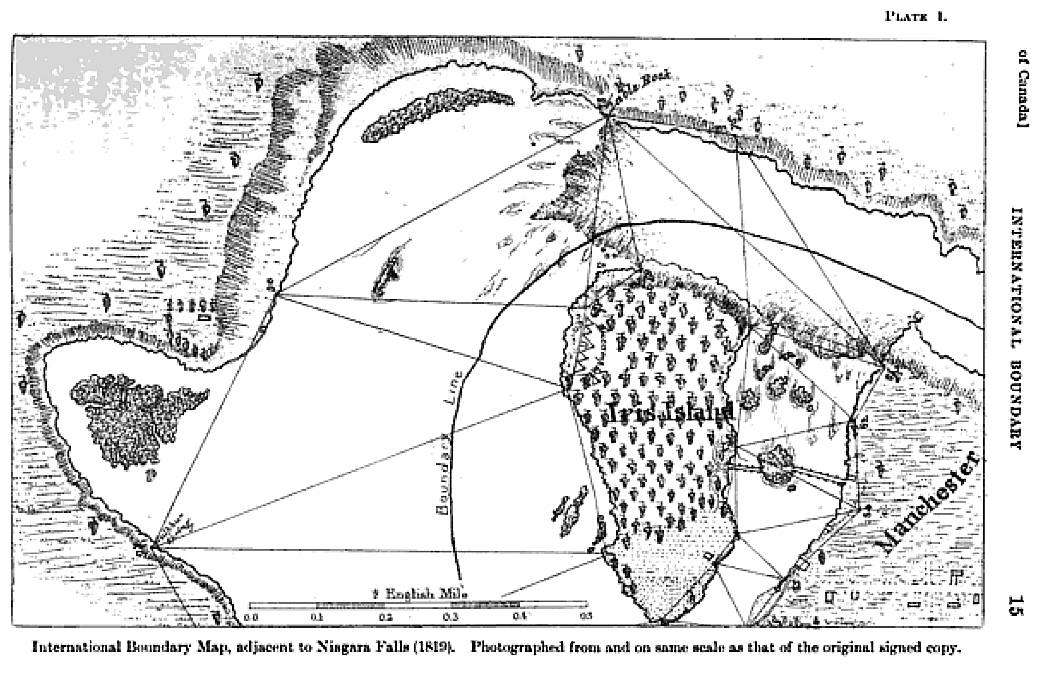
1819 Boundary Commission map of the International Boundary Line cutting through Horseshoe Falls

When the boundary line between the United States and Canada was determined in 1819, based on the Treaty of Ghent, the northeastern end of the Horseshoe Falls was in New York, United States, flowing around the Terrapin Rocks, which were once connected to Goat Island by a series of bridges. In 1955, the area between the rocks and Goat Island was filled in, creating Terrapin Point. In the early 1980s the United States Army Corps of Engineers filled in more land and built diversion dams and retaining walls to force the water away from Terrapin Point. Altogether, 400 ft (120 m) of the Horseshoe Falls was eliminated. Due to erosion, the Falls will continue to move in relation to the boundary line in the future, possibly altering territorial boundaries between the two countries.

The official national maps for both Canada and the United States indicate that a smaller portion of the Horseshoe Falls currently is located within the United States.

== Gallery ==
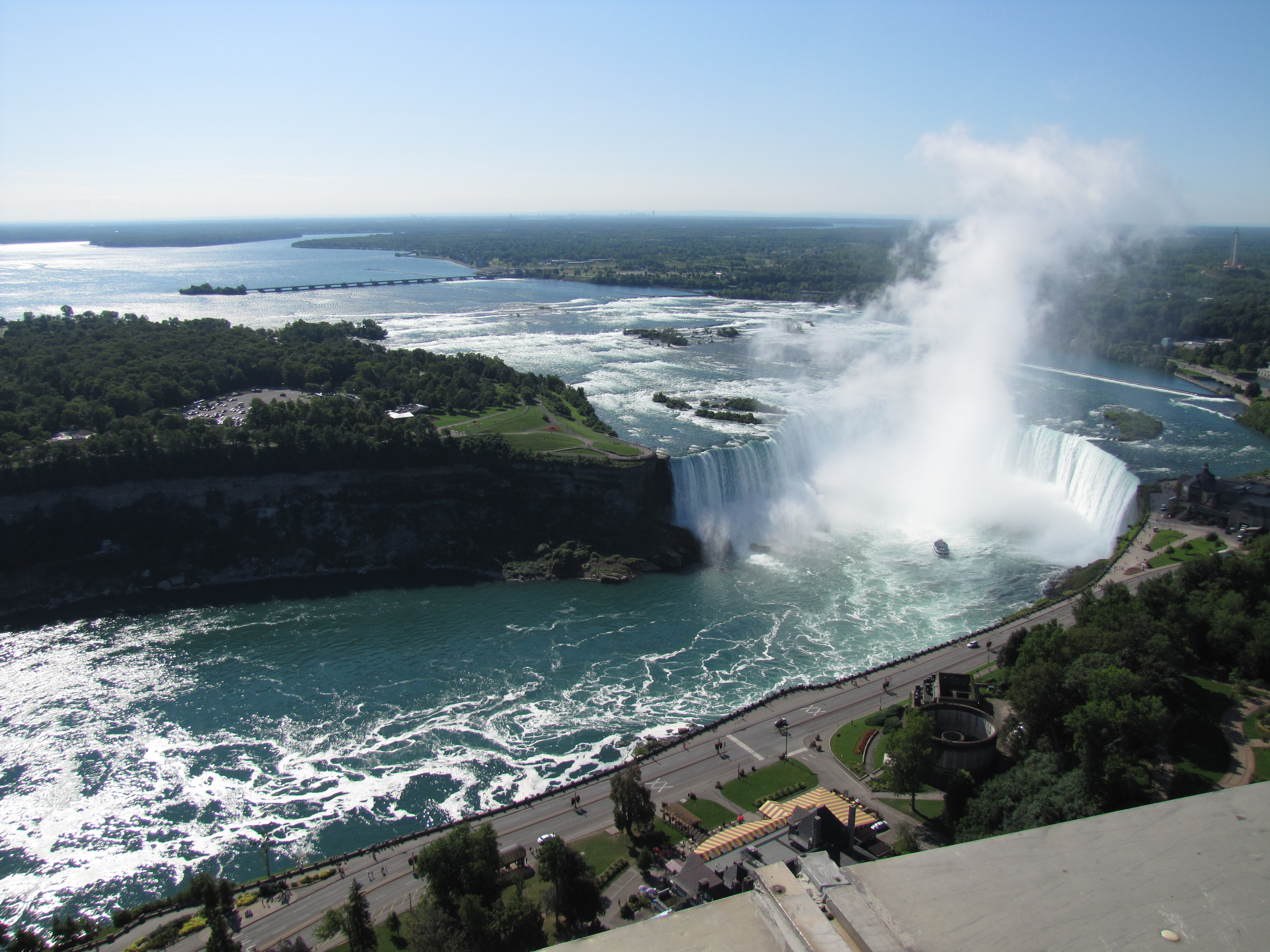
Overview

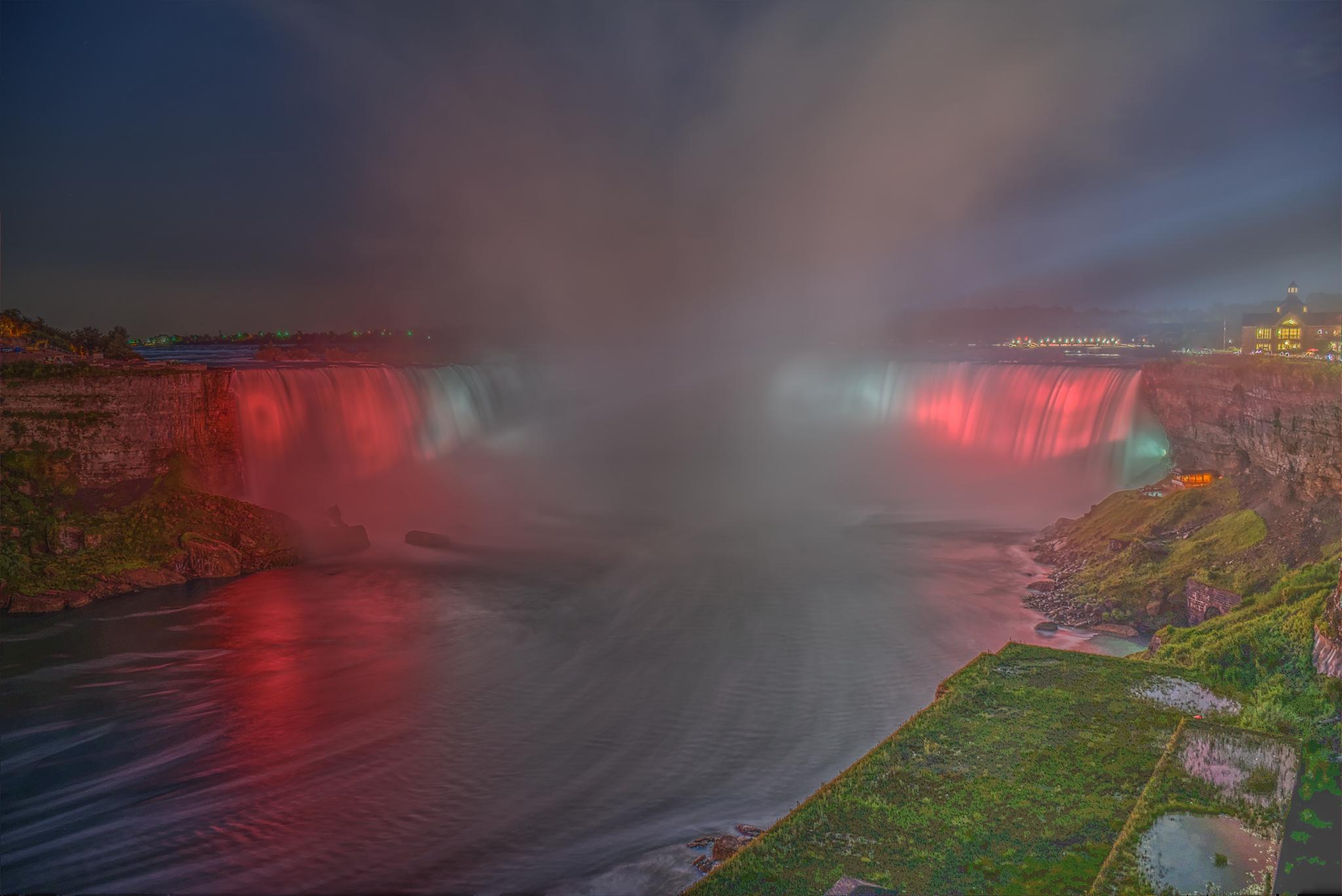
Horseshoe Falls at night

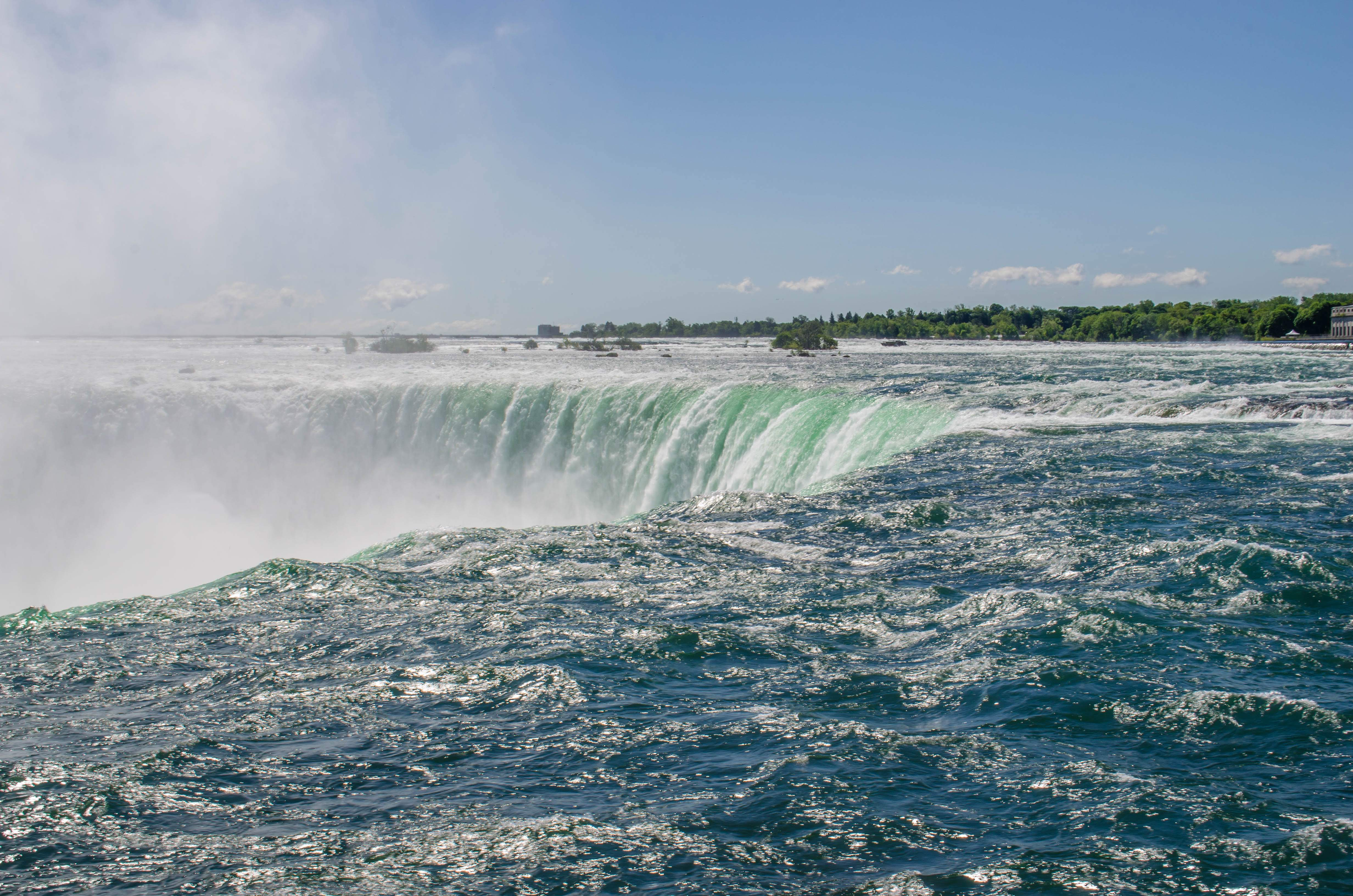
Horseshoe Falls, viewed from Table Rock Centre in Niagara Falls, Ontario

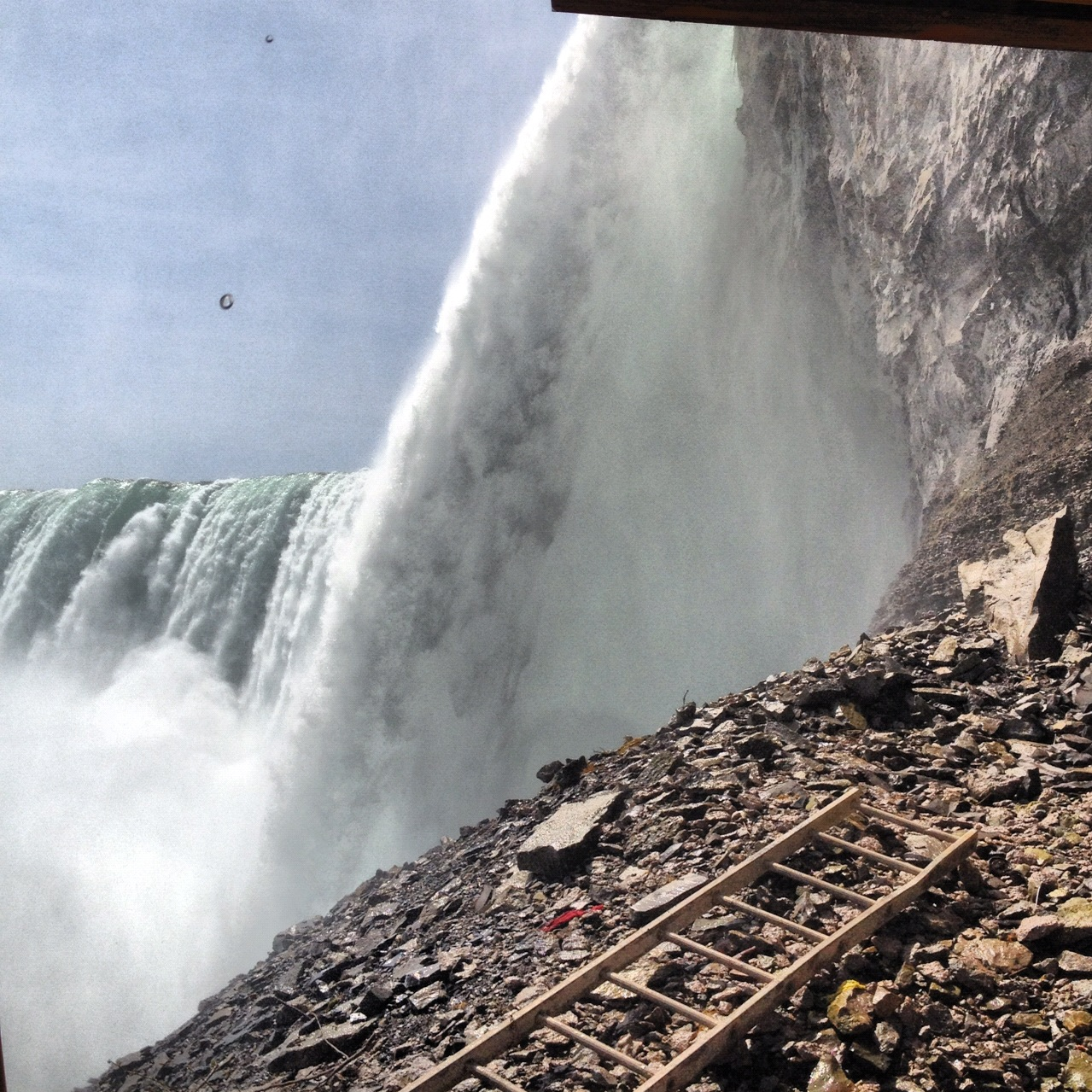
View from beside and behind Horseshoe Falls

Horseshoe Falls, viewed from the Maid of the Mist tour boat

A view of Horseshoe Falls with the Canadian flag at night

== See also ==
- List of waterfalls of Canada
- Niagara Parks Commission
