= Luminaria (disambiguation) =

Luminaria and similar terms may refer to:

== Holiday illuminations ==
- Luminaria, also known as a farolito, a paper lantern
- Luminaria (vigil fire), traditional bonfires in New Mexico
- Luminarias festival, ritual bonfires in San Bartolomé de Pinares

== Music and film ==
- Luminaria (album) by Ian Moore
- Luminarias (film) written by Evelina Fernandez

== Places ==
- Luminárias, a municipality in Minas Gerais, Brazil

== Other ==
- Disney's LuminAria, a fireworks show held from 2001 to 2002 at Disney's California Adventure
- Luminaria Contemporary Arts Festival, held annually in downtown San Antonio, Texas, since 2008

== See also ==
- Luminary (disambiguation)
