= Festival of Lights =

Festival of Lights or Celebration of Light may refer to:

== Religious and traditional celebrations ==
=== Abrahamic religions ===
- Candlemas, a Christian holiday
- Christmas, a Christian holiday
- Eid al-Adha, a Muslim holiday
- Eid al-Fitr, a Muslim holiday
- Hanukkah, a Jewish holiday
- Saint Lucy's Day, a Christian holiday

=== Dharmic and East Asian religions ===
- Dev Deepavali, a Hindu festival of lights celebrated in Varanasi, India
- Diwali, a religious festival associated with Hinduism, Sikhism, Buddhism, and Jainism
- Karthika Deepam, a post-Diwali Tamil festival associated with Hinduism
- Kartik Purnima, a post-Diwali religious festival associated with Hinduism, Sikhism, and Jainism
- Lantern Festival, a Chinese festival, originating in Buddhism, that marks the last day of the Lunar New Year or Spring Festival
- Tazaungdaing festival, a Buddhist festival in Myanmar marking the end of Kathina

=== Other traditions ===
- Imbolc, a Gaelic and Neopagan festival
- Kwanzaa, an annual celebration of African-American culture

== Organized festivals and events ==
=== Asia ===
- Guangzhou International Light Festival, an annual light festival in Guangzhou, China
- Kobe Luminarie, an annual light festival in Kobe, Japan

=== Europe ===
- Festival of Lights (Berlin), an annual light art festival in Berlin, Germany
- Festival of Lights (Lyon), a French local tradition known as Fête des lumières
- GLOW Festival Eindhoven, an annual light art festival in Eindhoven, Netherlands
- Lichtrouten Luedenscheid, a light art festival in Lüdenscheid, Germany
- Lichtstadt Feldkirch, a light art festival in Feldkirch, Austria
- Light Night, an annual light festival in Leeds, United Kingdom
- Llum BCN, an annual light festival in Barcelona, Spain
- Lumiere (festival), a light festival held in Durham and other UK cities
- Luminale, a biennial festival of light culture in Frankfurt, Germany
- Lux Helsinki, an annual light art event in Helsinki, Finland
- Nationwide Festival of Light, a series of rallies by conservative Christian groups in September 1971 in the United Kingdom
- Signal Festival, an annual light art festival in Prague, Czech Republic
- Spectra Festival of Light, an annual light festival in Aberdeen, Scotland

=== Middle East ===
- Jerusalem Festival of Light, an annual outdoor summer art festival in Jerusalem
- Noor Riyadh, an annual light art festival in Riyadh, Saudi Arabia
- Sharjah Light Festival, an annual light festival in Sharjah, United Arab Emirates

=== North America ===
==== Canada ====
- Cavalcade of Lights Festival, in Toronto, Ontario
- Celebration of Light, a fireworks and light display in Vancouver, British Columbia
- Festival of Northern Lights, held each winter in Owen Sound, Ontario
- Peterborough Musicfest, formerly named the Peterborough Summer Festival of Lights, a concert series in Peterborough, Ontario
- Winter Festival of Lights, in Niagara Falls, Ontario

==== United States ====
- Celebration of Lights, a former winter lights festival in Pittsburgh, Pennsylvania
- Festival of Lights (Hawaii), an annual Christmas celebration in Hawaii
- Holiday Trail of Lights, a multi-city event celebrated in Louisiana and Texas
- Magnificent Mile Lights Festival, an annual festival on North Michigan Avenue, Chicago, Illinois
- Nights of Lights, an annual holiday light festival in St. Augustine, Florida

=== Oceania ===
- Enlighten Canberra, an annual light festival in Canberra, Australia
- Festival of Lights (New Plymouth), a summer event of lights and performances in New Zealand
- Vivid Sydney, an annual festival of light, music and ideas in Sydney, Australia

=== Southeast Asia ===
- I Light Marina Bay, a light art festival in Singapore

== Other uses ==
- Festival of Lights (film), a 2010 film
- Festival of Light Australia, an advocacy group

== See also ==
- Light art
- Winter light festival
