= Luminary =

A celestial body, as the sun or moon or an object that gives light; or, a person of eminence or brilliant achievement. From Old French luminarie or late Latin luminarium, from Latin lumen, lumin- "light".

Luminary may also refer to:

- Luminary (astrology), in traditional astrology, one of the two brightest and most astrological planets: the Sun and the Moon
- Luminary (Gnosticism), of which four are typically given

== Media ==
- The Luminary, Atlanta, Georgia's first newspaper (1846–1849)
- Luminary (Laramore), a public artwork created in 2008 on the campus of Indiana University-Purdue University Indianapolis

=== Fiction ===
- "Luminary" (Millennium), the 12th episode of season 2 (and 34th overall) of Millennium, which aired in 1998
- Global Luminary or Luminary – Rise of the Goonzu, a game on game portal NDOORS
- The Luminaries, 2013 novel by Eleanor Catton
- The Luminary, the player character of Dragon Quest XI

== Other uses ==
- LUMINARY, the software program controlling the Apollo Guidance Computer in the lunar module of the Apollo missions
- Luminary Group, a licensing and intellectual property management company
- Luminary (podcast network), a subscription podcast network

== See also ==
- Festival of Lights (disambiguation)
- Kobe Luminarie, a Japanese light festival
- Luminaire, a light fixture
- Luminaria, a type of Mexican lantern
- Luminárias, a Brazilian municipality located in the state of Minas Gerais
- My Luminaries, a British alternative rock band, active 2004–2010
