= Christmas in New Mexico =

Overview of the role and celebration of Christmas in the U.S. state of New Mexico

Christmas traditions in New Mexico are influenced by Spanish, Native American, and Anglo-American traditions.

== Decorations ==
Common decorations include farolitos, small paper bags filled with sand that hold a candle inside. They are commonly placed along paths, on top of roofs, and on porches. These are believed to have been brought to New Mexico by Spanish traders in the Philippines who saw Chinese paper lanterns and brought them back to New Spain. These sand bags containing small candles are also often also called luminarias. The words farolito and luminaria are synonymous today, but traditionally luminarias are wood fires while farolitos are lit bags commonly seen in New Mexico at Christmas time. Faralitos have come to represent the winter season, kept promises, and Christmas spirit. Christmas trees and wreaths, made from local pine trees, were brought to New Mexico by German immigrants and German-Americans from the Midwest. Chiles red and green in color often hang from rooftops over porches. Luminarias are large bonfires made of pinyon logs.

== Celebrations ==
Native Americans of New Mexico often partake in matachines dances around Christmas time. These dances combine elements of the Spanish El Moros y los Cristianos dances, traditional Native American rituals, and Mexican indigenous ritual dances. The Procession of our Lady of Guadalupe is celebrated by Hispanos and Mexican-Americans. Las Posadas is a celebration in which revelers, dressed as Mary and Joseph and Hebrew people, go from house to house asking for shelter to reenact the Nativity.
