= Winter Festival of Lights =

Lights festival in Niagara Falls, Canada

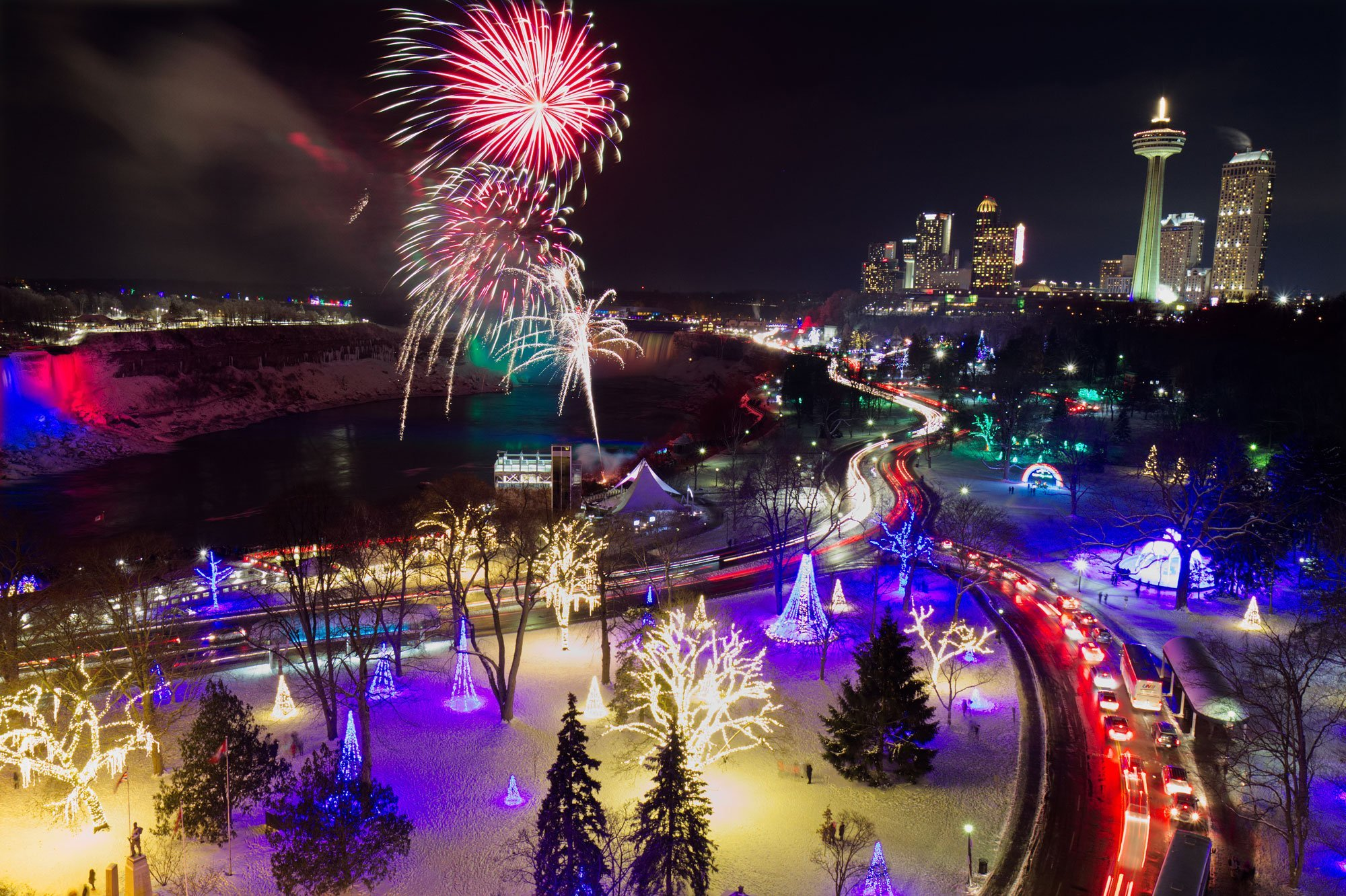
The festival in 2020 on Niagara Parkway

The Winter Festival of Lights in Niagara Falls, Ontario, is Canada's largest lights festival. It runs from mid-November to mid-January and attracts over one million visitors annually. The event has free admission while accepting voluntary donations. As of 2023, it features a decorated eight-kilometre route along the Niagara Parkway that extends into the tourist districts and the Dufferin Islands. The lights are installed and run by Ontario Power Generation.

== History ==
The Winter Festival of Lights was founded in 1982 with the mandate of developing tourism in Niagara Falls during the winter months. Its creation was inspired by a lights festival that started in Niagara Falls, New York, in 1981, that was also intended attract tourists to Niagara Falls during the off-season. This separate event in New York was held annually until 2001. The early editions of the festivals competed with the New York event and did not perform as well as their counterpart. Recurring themes in the annual displays are a variety of designs. Religious displays have included a Hanukkah menorah, Noah's Ark, and Hajj. Recurring sections of the route include areas dubbed the "Royal Promenade", "Frosted Falls", "Enchanted Forest" and "Great Canadian North".

In 1992, The Walt Disney Company began partnering with the event, allowing for the illuminated display of Disney characters. During this partnership, a section of the route in Queen Victoria Park contained these animated displays as "Enchantment of Disney". This partnership continued until 2013, when Disney made the decision to limit depictions of these characters to their own theme parks. Korean lanterns replaced the Disney displays for 2014, to celebrate fifty years of diplomatic relations between Canada and South Korea. Other themed light displays have since replaced where the Disney displays were previously held. The 2024 event had 75 light displays which were composed of three million individual lights.

== See also ==
- Festival of Lights
- Light-emitting diode
