= Dufferin Islands =

Artificial islands in Niagara Falls, Ontario, Canada

Coordinates: 43.068613°N 79.070685°W

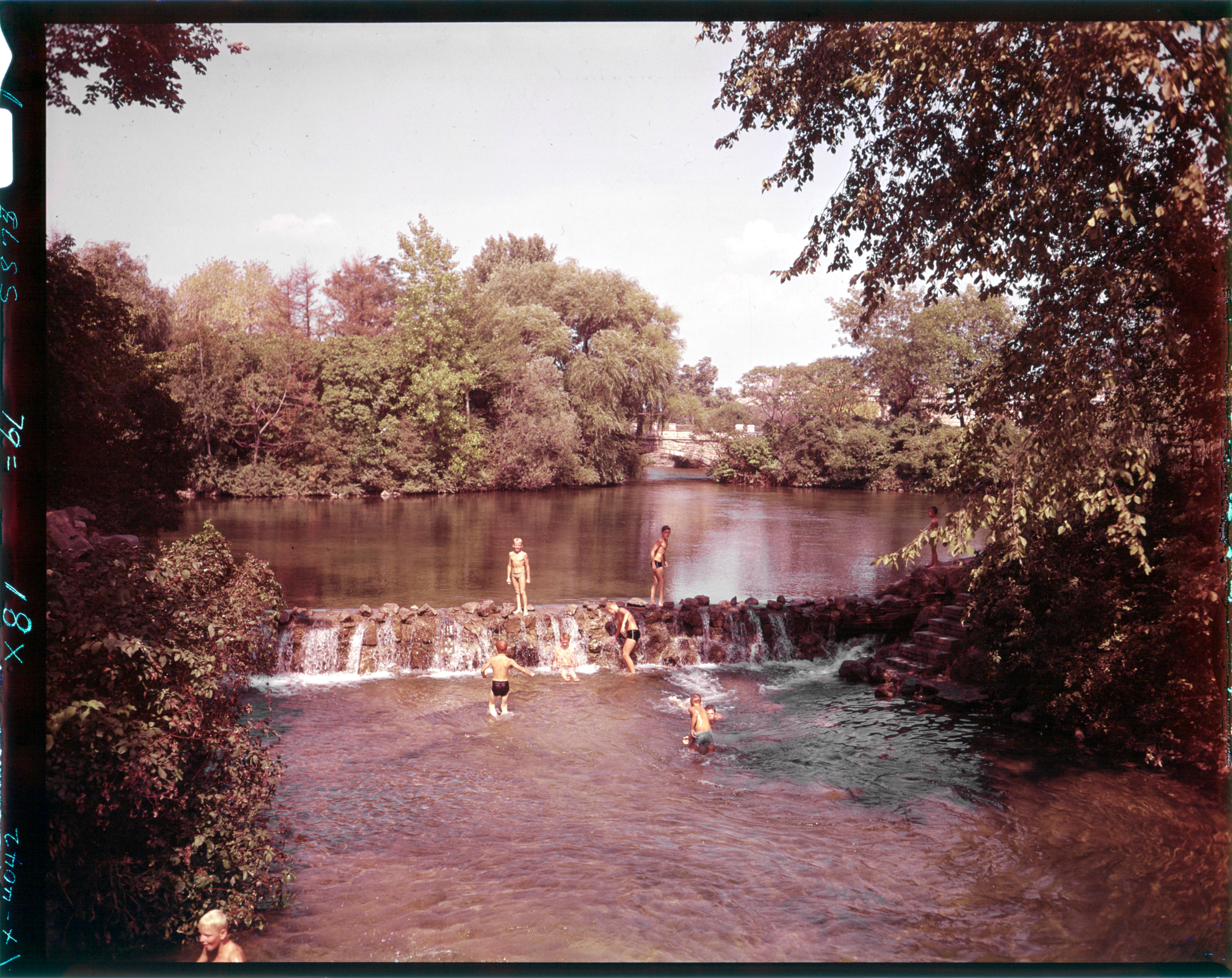
Historical photo of Dufferin Islands that is part of the Archives of Ontario collection.

Dufferin Islands are a group of artificial islands located 0.8 km from the Horseshoe Falls in Niagara Falls, Ontario. Before being renamed by the Niagara Parks Commission, they were known as Clarke Hill Islands and Cynthia Islands. The islands are decorated annually for the Winter Festival of Lights.

== Early history ==
While Niagara Falls, New York, became more well known for industry development along the lower river's edge in the 1870s, this took place much earlier on the Canadian side. In 1794, permission was granted to erect a saw and grist mill at the eastern upriver end of the islands. This was followed by an iron ore mill constructed in 1796. Ownership of the properties was transferred to area Samuel Street and Thomas Clark by 1801, with the islands being named Clark Hill Islands in 1805. These mills were burned by American forces on July 26, 1814, following the Battle of Lundy's Lane during the War of 1812. In 1854, Thomas Clark Street took ownership of the property and renamed it as the Cynthia Islands. The islands were not accessible to the public until 1877, when ownership was transferred to Sutherland Macklem, Street's heir. Macklem arranged for a pair of suspension bridges to be built in order to facilitate pedestrian and carriage traffic throughout the area. The Burning Spring, which could then be found on the islands' shoreline, became one of the earliest tourist attractions in the city. Natural gas was present in the area, causing the burning effect.

== Under the Niagara Parks Commission ==
When the Parks Commission took over, they renamed the islands in honor of Canadian Governor-General Lord Dufferin, who had been instrumental in establishing parkland along the river to replace "The Front", a notoriously rowdy tourist area. The islands remained untouched until 1902, when the Ontario Power Company began construction on their lower river power facility, which required river water to be drawn from a point just east of the islands. The water diversion reduced the flow through the islands to an extent that the power company, through an earlier agreement with the Parks Commission, created a series of man-made islands and cascades to compensate. Initial work was completed by 1905, but the Parks Commission rejected the resulting layout, saying the arrangement was too formal and "out of place with the surroundings." Beginning in 1918, surplus dirt and stone were placed strategically around the islands, giving them a more natural look.

Except for the years of World War II when the islands were barricaded, the public has enjoyed free access. For many years, bathing and swimming areas were located here, first established in 1907 and moving to a site further west by 1962. This area remained in use until the early 2000s, when it was removed due to safety concerns brought on by swimmers diving from surrounding bridges into the shallow water, as well as maintenance issues.
