= Cavalcade of Lights Festival =

Annual event in Toronto, Ontario, Canada

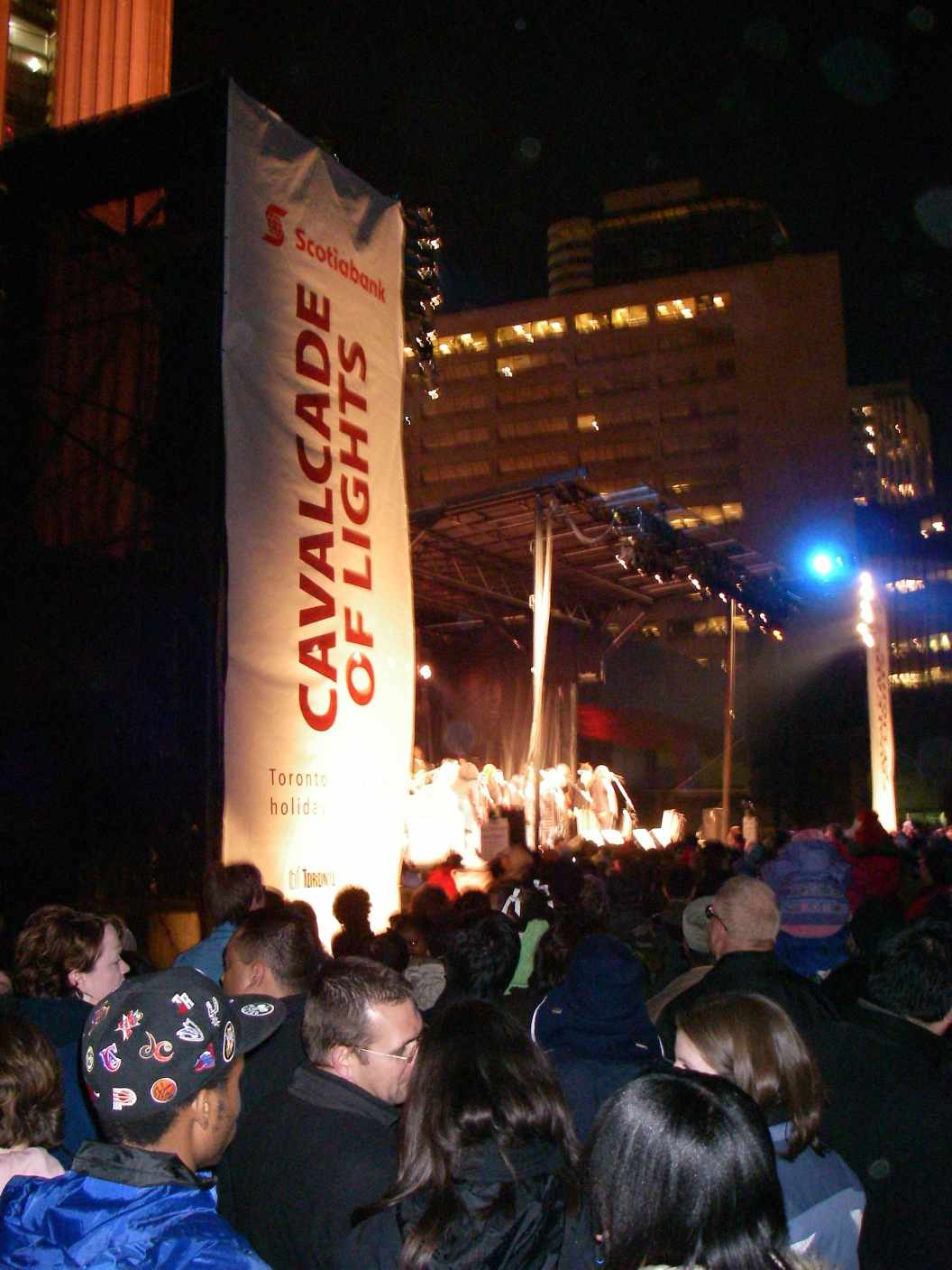
Cavalcade of lights banner on speaker stack, with stage in background

The Cavalcade of Lights Festival is an annual event highlighting the lighting of the City of Toronto government's official Christmas tree at Nathan Phillips Square in Toronto, Ontario, Canada. The event has been held annually since 1967.

The event falls on the final weekend of November to kick off the holiday season with the official illumination of the square and Christmas tree. The lighting display features the official Christmas tree and more than 300,000 energy-efficient LED lights that are illuminated from dusk to 11:00 p.m. every night throughout the holiday season.

Since 2002, Cavalcade of Lights has been transformed from a one-night event to a month-long one with the addition of Saturday night skating parties to live music at Nathan Phillips Square's outdoor rink. These parties include a public free skate, and figure skating performances.

In 2004, the event expanded citywide by adding displays of energy-efficient LED lighting in Toronto neighborhoods.

== Past performers ==
The Cavalcade of Lights has presented Canadian and international performers as part of each year's festivities. Past performers in recent years have included:

- 2005: Esthero, In Essence, Patrizia "Rock Soprano" Lisa Odjig, DJ Starting from Scratch, Circus Orange and the Arabesque Dance Company.
- 2006: Joel Plaskett, jacksoul, God Made Me Funky, Stabilo (band), Lindy, Divine Brown, Faith Chorale and Kayte Burgess.
- 2007: Kim Stockwood, Murray McLauchlan, Nikki Yanofsky, Sarah Slean, Louis Pitre, Jully Black, Suzi McNeil, DJ Alvaro, Tomi Swick, Hayley Sales. DJ Tricky Moreira, The Golden Dogs and In-Flight Safety.
- 2008: Serena Ryder, the Canadian Tenors, Alex Cuba, Dragonette, DJ Denise Benson, DJ Tony Sutherland, Andrew Craig, Toya Alexis, Zack Werner and the final three Canadian Idol contestants of the season.
- 2014: Maestro Fresh Wes, Kardinal Offishall, and Shad
- 2024: Zero Gravity Circus, Trash Panda Brass (Circus), Northern Legs Southern Fists, DJ Dre Ngozi, figure skater pair Lia Pereira and Trennt Michaud, and MoZayic.
- 2026: DJ Classic Roots, The Candy Cane Carolers, Afro-Brazilian percussion by Maracatu Mar Aberto, electric violinist Dr. Draw, Klezmer parade band The Horah Machine, and Tyler Shaw.

== See also ==
- Festival of Lights
