= Winter light festival =

A winter light festival is one of several annual events organized in different part of the world and among different cultures, to celebrate the end of the winter and the beginning of the light seasons with art workshops, light designs, live music and street food. Originally, this kind of celebration had a religious and spiritual meaning, to celebrate the end of the dark period of the year and the beginning of the days of light. Nowadays, these events have lost the spiritual meaning to leave much more space to the consumeristic

== Significance of light in religions ==
Festivals of light are strongly related to the religious significance of light, which is generally considered as a rebirth of the spirit and the mind, a moment in which the good overcome the bad. Although each religion has a different interpretation of light, all these festivals are connected to an ancient celebration typical of the Hindu culture. This event was later processed by different cultures and religions according to their own features and beliefs, creating slightly different rituals they participate to.

=== The light in Hinduism ===
In Hinduism light symbolizes not only everything with a divine quality, but also the illumination of mind. According to the scriptures, in the beginning there was nothing, neither the sky, nor the sun, the moon and the earth. Then the dawn of light manifested as the golden egg: it started the days of Brahman. The dawns, Usha, the sister of the sun, brings hope and she woke the mortal beings up. Light is the essential nature of the soul and it plays a crucial role in the Hindu culture: people pray to invoke the god of lights, Savitr, to illuminate the world and their minds, and to free them from ignorance and delusion. The most important celebration of light in Hinduism is the Diwali: it represent both the victory of light over darkness, and the beginning of the financial year. The Diwali festival is also present in Janism with the same meaning.

=== The light in Judaism ===
According to Judaism, the light does not belong to this world, rather it's an emanation of a different essence, from the other side of reality. Light serves as the symbol of the good and the beautiful, of all that is positive. Divine revelation is itself a revelation of light. The Hannuka is the principal festival of light in Judaism.

=== The light in Buddhism ===
In Buddhism, light can symbolises many things: not only light is seen as the wisdom that dispels the darkness of ignorance, it is also considered as the presence of God within all human. Also, offering a candle means putting others in front of oneself, removing the egoist mind. The Tazaungdaing Festival is a folk ritual in line with a celebration of light. Full of lanterns, music, dances and shows, this festival is mainly celebrated in honour of the guardian gods of the planets.

== The culture of festivals ==
A festival is a day or time of religious, cultural or other celebration that recurs at regular intervals, marked by feasting, ceremonies, or other observances. It is celebrated by a community that share the same values and motivations. Festivals are a place for people of all kinds to come together. This kind of celebration has an important cultural meaning: they are part of the culture of every community.

=== Origins ===
The typical origin of festivals is religion. Every religion has its rituals, celebrations and traditions maintained during time. The most important religious festivals such as Christmas, Hanukkah, Diwali serve to mark out the year. Among many religion a feast or festival is a set of celebration in honour of God or gods and they recur annually. Other festivals have an agricultural origin: a harvest festival is an annual celebration and occurs around the time of the main harvest of a given region, celebrating seasonal changes. An example is Thanksgiving Day, a national holiday celebrated in Canada and the United States. Festivals are celebrated since ancient time: people met each other and shared the same motivations, in particular they shared the same spiritual significance of festivals. People gave a great importance to this kind of celebration, especially to religious ones. Many festivals have a very ancient history: for example festival in India is an essential topic because it leaves a special significance about culture and true Indian faith. The celebrations are also now a moment of remembrance, marking the rites of birth, death and renewal.

=== Main features ===
Festivals always have a theme, all in pursuit of fostering a specific kind of experience. This specific theme serves to fulfil communal purposes. This is what can create a sense of community: people share interests, motivation and of course time. There is a sense of belonging for religious, social, or geographical groups, contributing to group cohesiveness. A festival also deals with past and present traditions of these communities and contribute to create their culture. Every kind of festival enriches the personal experience of any individuals giving a certain spiritual significance that can be perceived different from one another. For example, during the festival of light every person can attribute a particular meaning to what he/she sees: the light is the theme and the experience that everyone can gain from it is something completely personal and spiritual. Connected to festivals there is the entertainment: a festival is seen as entertainment not only by participants but also by who does not join in the celebration. A festival is always something spectacular from all points of view. Many activities are organized during festivals in order to involve people and give them the best experience.

=== Festivals in the modern age ===
Festivals are cultural celebrations and have always occupied a special place in societies. Their celebratory roles, and the many cultural and social implications of ritual and festivity, have long attracted the interest of sociologists and anthropologists. Celebration embodies an intellectual, behavioural and emotional experience, with the emotional responses of all participants. While primitive celebrations might started in concert with agriculture and climate, modern festivals are mostly created and organized with multiple goals, stakeholders and meanings attached to them. Now there is an economic impact of festivals, more than ever. A recent phenomena is “festivalization” which suggests an over-commodification of festivals exploited by tourism and place marketers. So festivals play an important role in tourism: their role includes attracting tourists, giving a contribution to place marketing, animating attractions and places, and acting as catalysts for other forms of development. Every country has its celebrations, however a festival in one country might be perceived quite differently from festivals in other countries: what is important is the experience and the meanings attached to it. Festivals are connected to cultures and to places, giving each identity and helping bind people to their communities. Similarly, festivals and other planned events can encourage and reinforce group identity. There are myths and symbols connected to traditional festivals, but in modern societies sometimes it is necessary or desirable to invent myths or symbolism with political, religious or other meanings. Motivations to attend festivals have been developed: researchers have demonstrated that people participate to events for entertainment and diversion, socializing, learning and doing something new or novelty seeking. The part of consume is also important nowadays: souvenirs and gifts, or merchandise sold at festivals can also be considered part of the experience.

== Winter Light Festivals among different cultures ==
Winter Light Festivals are organized all over the world, and their features are the reflexions of the culture of the place in which they are taking place. With lights always present as main characters, these festivals includes artistic events, workshops, activities of all sort, and live music. There are dozens of Winter Light Festivals, but the major ones are five and the following.

=== Reykjavik Festival (Iceland) ===
Reykjavik Festival is an annual event, usually taking place in the capital of Iceland, during the first days of February (4-7 February in the recent edition of 2016). The aim of this festival is to stimulate the city life in the midwinter and to celebrate both the winter world and the growing light after a long period of darkness. The program of this event is a mixture of art and industry, environment and history, sports and culture and provides entertainment for Reykjavík's locals and guests alike. The festival usually starts with an artwork session: the façade of the Harpa Concert Hall is transformed into a giant canvas that participants are able to illustrate with virtual paint, giving a colorful spectacle. The program continue reflecting the many faces of Reykjavík capital area, involving all the major museums, thermal pools, and a ski resort staying open during the nights to host different cultural and artistic activities. Another crucial moment is the storytelling activities, held to discover the ancient origins of the island.

=== Portland Winter Light Festival (Oregon), United States ===
Inspired by light festivals around the globe, the Portland Winter Light Festival is an annual event, taking place during the first days of February by the Oregon Museum of Science and Industry. It is designed to celebrate the spirit of winter and warmth of community; using light, color, artistry, performance, and imagination, this festival wants to bring people together during a time of year typically reserved for the indoors, and is centered on innovation as the result of the collaboration between art and science.

=== Winter Light Festival of Gaithersburg (Maryland) – U.S.A. ===
Organized since 1995, a festival takes place in the Seneca Creek State Park of Gaithersburg. During this one-month event (from November 27 to December 31), people can drive with their families or in group, through a 3,5 miles path of light displays, experiencing a peculiar night journey in the park. The show consists in a total of 365 light displays, of all kinds, 65 of which are animated. Among these, the most peculiar are a 4 feet tall castle, unicorns, Christmas trees and typical Christmas sweets, and ducks floating on the lake of the park. As this festival celebrate the winter, all the installations are linked to this topic and they are sort of divided into four main categories: the North Pole, the Teddy Bear land, the Toyland, the Penguin Cave.

=== Magical Winter Light Festival of Houston (Texas) – U.S.A. ===
Open from 13 December to 10 January (in the edition of 2015), this holiday festival wants to be a celebration of holiday, and all different cultures through lights. This annual event is strongly based on the Chinese traditional lantern celebration: all installations are huge lanterns with different shapes and colours that create a sort of travel around the world participants can enjoy with their families and friends. During this celebration, there are also carnival rides, games, cultural and traditional performances (the Chinese acrobatic team), fusion cuisine, and live music.

=== Nabana no Sato Festival (Japan) – Asia ===
One of the very best winter illuminations that can be seen across Japan during the winter season is that at Nabana no Sato in Mie Prefecture. Nabana No Sato is a park, entirely dedicated to flowers. This park, located on the island of Nagashima in Kuwana City, is famous for its seasonal flower shows, taking place during the whole year. The Winter Light Festival of Nabana no Sato is generally held from the end of October to the end of March (October 25 – March 31 in the edition of 2015). For this occasion, the park is illuminated with around 8 million LED lights, which turn it into a winter wonderland straight out of a fairy tale. The theme of the displays changes from year to year, with spectacular LED illuminated models of objects existing in nature (like the representation of Mount Fuji or the 20 meters tall Niagara Falls model). A very characteristic feature of this festival, is the 200 meters long light tunnel, made up of around 1.2 million light bulbs. Each of these bulbs is the representation of a tiny flower, and all together, they draw a wonderful path across the entire park. In recent times, a new light tunnel has been added: the Kawazu Sakura light tunnel, 100 meters long with around 700,000 pink LED lights. Designed to resemble the Kawazu cherry tree, this tunnel is very popular with couples. With its pink colour, this installation is a hint of the warmth of spring which is a few months away. The park where this whole festival is held, is quite large and it involves a lot of walking; for this reason, there is also an ashiyu foot bath. The foot spa is free to use and is a welcome relief to soak the tired feet of participants, as well as to warm up from the cold. The spa is made from natural spring water contained underground. Finally, at the end of the walk, one can purchase some souvenirs at the shops, or have a meal at one of the many restaurants around the park.

== See also ==
- Diwali
- Hannuka
- Festival
- Festival of Lights
