= Luminaria =

Christmas-related decoration consisting of a candle contained in a paper bag

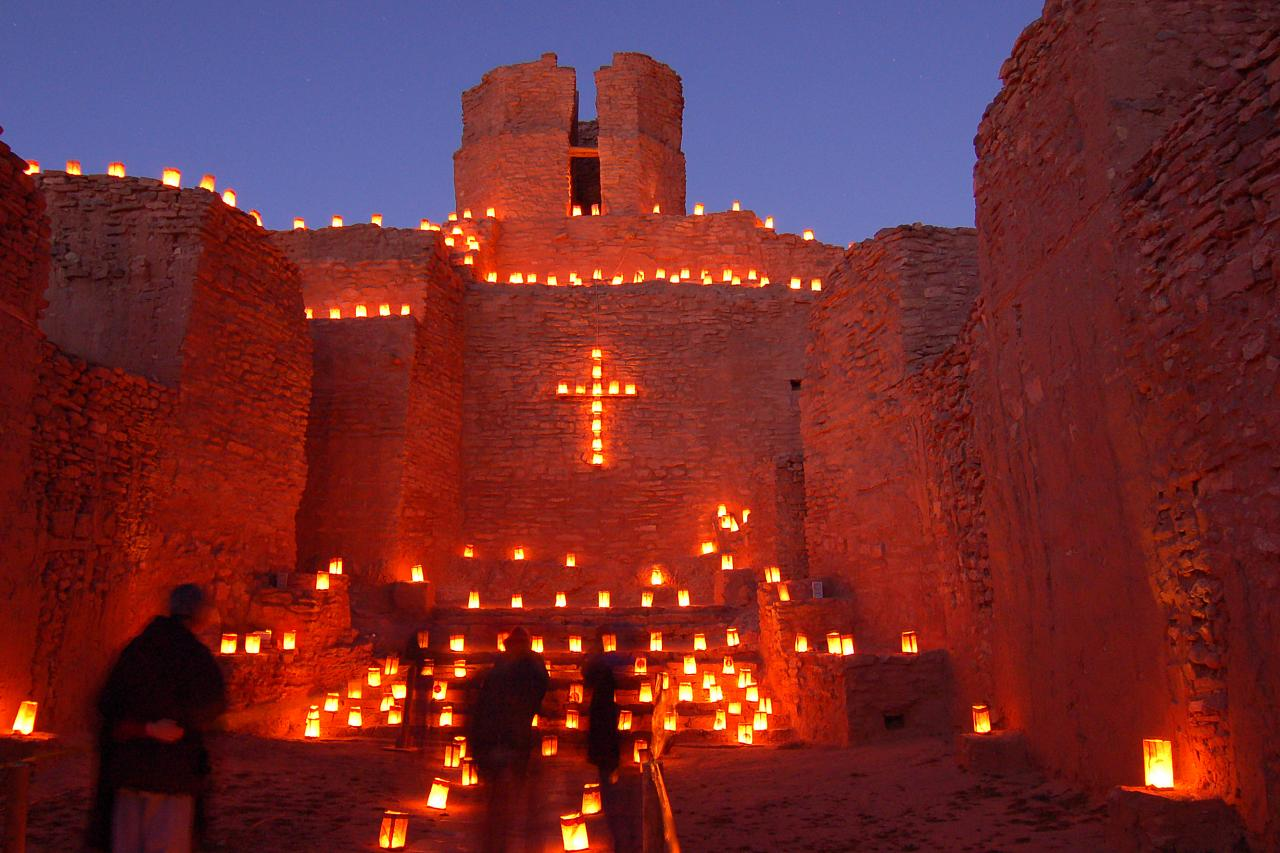
Farolitos, old mission church, Jemez State Monument

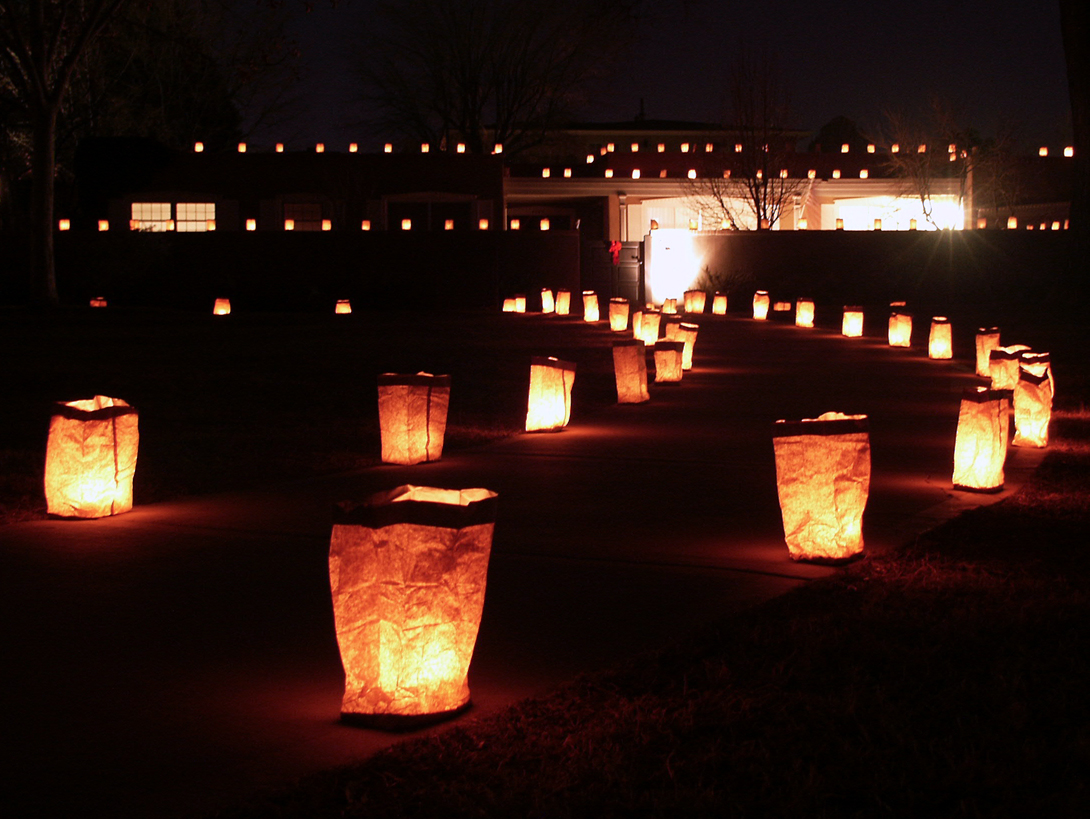
A typical luminaria display in Albuquerque, New Mexico

Luminaria is a term used in different parts of the world to describe various types of holiday lights, usually displayed during Christmas. In English, the term most commonly refers to a specific type of simple paper lantern made by placing a votive candle in some sand inside a paper bag. Also known as a farolito (Note: "But farolitos and luminarias have come to mean the same thing in late 20th-century New Mexico parlance..."), it is a traditional Christmas decoration in the Southwestern United States, particularly New Mexico, where it is a cultural hallmark of the Pueblos and Hispanos of New Mexico and a part of the state's distinct heritage. Luminarias are usually placed in rows along walls, roofs, and walkways to form a holiday display, especially on Christmas Eve.

Electrically lit luminarias are also used, consisting of a string of standard incandescent "Christmas lights" with the bulbs covered with a tan plastic sleeve, made to about the size and shape of a small paper bag.

In Northern New Mexico, luminaria can also refer to a small stacked-wood bonfire, an older tradition which has been replaced to some extent by the paper luminarias. Residents of this region typically call the paper lanterns farolitos in order to distinguish the two types of illumination. Use of the word luminaria for paper lanterns is considered incorrect by some New Mexicans and is a frequent topic of debate.

Yet another form of luminaria, a small torch or large candle, is carried by the leader of the procession of Las Posadas, a nine-day holiday running December 16–24.

In non-English-speaking countries such as Italy, Spain, and Japan, luminaria is used in a much more general sense to describe any type of festive light display, including bonfires, candles, and electric lights.

== Etymology and naming disagreement ==
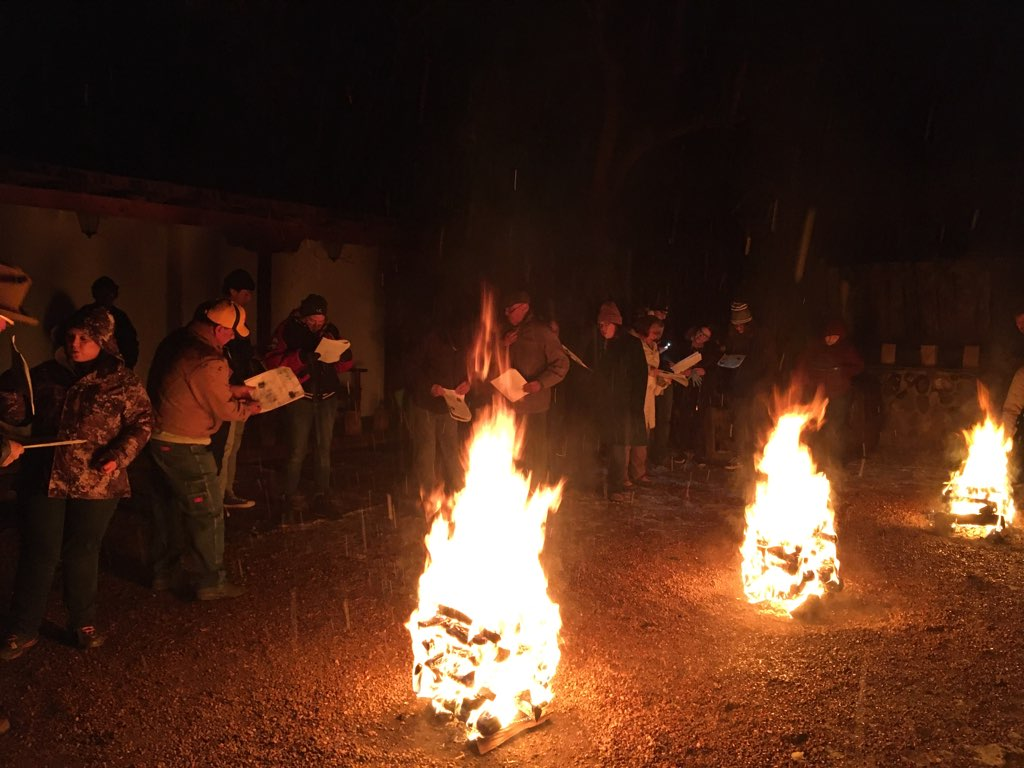
Luminaria bonfires in Santa Fe, New Mexico

The name of the decoration is a long-running item of contention among some New Mexicans, with written accounts indicating it was already a familiar topic of debate as far back as the 1940s. In Northern New Mexico, the term luminaria is reserved for a small festival or vigil bonfire, a usage which dates back to the Spanish colonial period, and the paper lantern decorations are called farolitos. Many traditionalists insist that the use of luminaria to mean a paper lantern is not correct. However, this distinction is not commonly made outside of northern New Mexico. In other areas where the decorations are used, they are generally referred to as luminarias.

Luminaria in Spanish means "illumination", "festival light", or in ecclesiastical usage, a "lamp kept burning before the sacrament". The Spanish word was derived from Latin luminare meaning a light source generally, or in a religious context, "a light, lamp, burned in the Jewish temple and in Christian churches". In colonial New Mexico, both terms were used to refer to a small bonfire. Luminaria as a loanword in English was first attested in the 1930s.

Farolito, a common term in northern New Mexico, is a diminutive of the Spanish word farol, meaning "lantern". According to the Santa Fe New Mexican, farolito "apparently is a purely New Mexico word".

The spellings "luminary" and "luminaries" are often incorrectly used instead of luminaria and luminarias.

== Origin ==
The use of paper lanterns during the Christmas Novena procession originates from the similar parol (Spanish farol) tradition of the Philippines which use lanterns made with bamboo and Japanese paper. These were introduced to New Spain via the Manila galleons.

== Christmas tradition ==
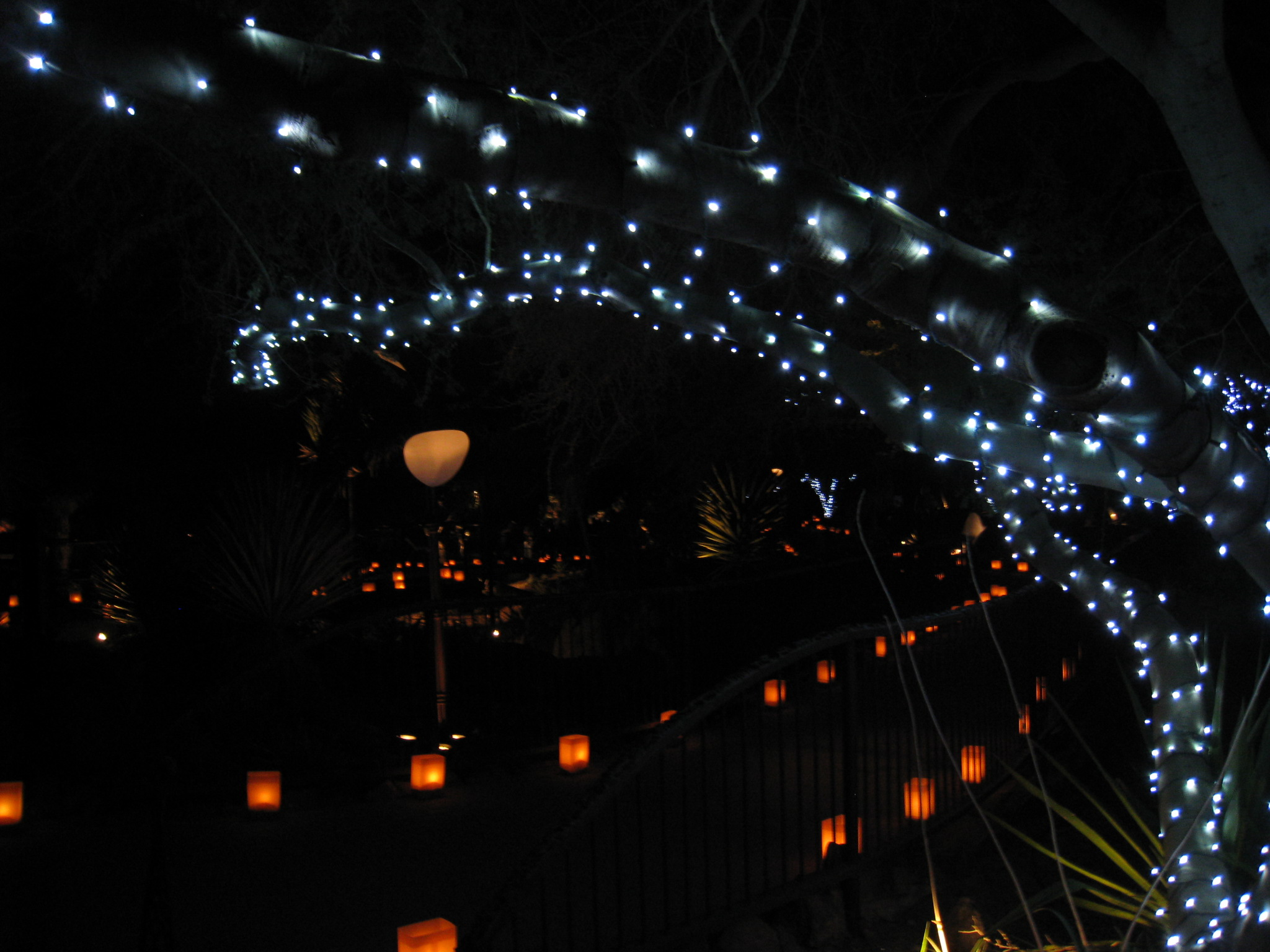
Las Noches de las Luminarias, at the Desert Botanical Garden, Phoenix

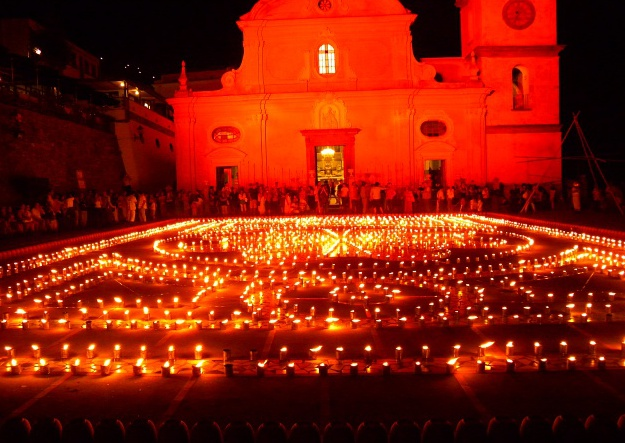
Praiano, Italy, Luminaria di San Domenico, August 1. Luminarias are used in seasons other than Christmas.

The early versions were actually small bonfires of crisscrossed piñon branches which were built in three-foot high squares. Today, luminarias are made from brown paper bags weighted down with sand and illuminated from within by a lit candle. These are typically arranged in rows to create large and elaborate displays. The hope among Roman Catholics is that the lights will guide the spirit of the Christ child to one's home.

Strings of artificial luminarias, with plastic bags illuminated by small light bulbs and connected by an electrical cord, are also available, and are common in the American Southwest, where they are typically displayed throughout the year-end holiday season. They have gained popularity in other parts of the United States.

== New Mexico ==
Santa Fe and Old Town Albuquerque, New Mexico, are well known for their impressive Christmas Eve farolito displays. Farolito displays are common throughout New Mexico, and most communities in New Mexico have farolitos in prominent areas such as major streets or parks. Residents often line their yards, fences, sidewalks, and roofs with farolitos. Similar traditions can now also be found in many other parts of the nation.

The University of New Mexico in Albuquerque, New Mexico hosts the annual Hanging of the Greens tradition with over 14,000 luminarias, hot posole, and Christmas carols.

New Mexico State University in Las Cruces, New Mexico holds an annual event called Noche de Luminarias in early December, which features over 10,000 luminarias across campus.

San Juan College in Farmington, New Mexico, organizes a large annual farolito display, most recently consisting of around 30,000 farolitos displayed on campus.

== Elsewhere ==
At historic Temple Square in Salt Lake City, Utah, metal luminarias decorate the grounds near the Church Office Building of the Church of Jesus Christ of Latter-day Saints.Tiny holes have been punched in the metal to create designs featuring scenes from the life of Jesus Christ and Christmas messages in a variety of languages. Some of the luminaries are the traditional bag shape, while others are large cans. They have been on display since before 2002, when even more were added.

In West Valley City, Utah, luminarias are used to light the path during the Walk with Santa held the first Monday of December every year. The display features over 300 luminarias.

The American Cancer Society's Relay For Life fundraising events which are held all over the U.S. feature luminaria ceremonies. Luminarias are placed around the track and some relay events spell out "HOPE" in stadium stands with luminarias.

The American Foundation for Suicide Prevention's Out of the Darkness Overnight uses luminarias at the end of the overnight walk to memorialize those lost to suicide for survivors.

Luminarias have also become popular in California in some cities. The Boy Scout Troops and Albuquerque Youth Symphony sell them around Christmas time as another form of fundraising.

On Evensham Street in the Glenshire Devonshire area of Truckee, California, local residents line the streets with luminaries. See Glenshire Devonshire's web page for aerial photos.

The Mantey Heights neighborhood of Grand Junction, Colorado, has celebrated the luminaria tradition for several decades. Over 3,500 luminaries are placed along the roads and walkways every Christmas Eve. Many are positioned atop the parapets of the old adobe homes.

In Champaign, Illinois, luminarias line South Willis Ave. between Springfield Ave. and John St. for one night each holiday season.

The Mount Lookout neighborhood of Cincinnati, Ohio, has an annual luminaria Light Up Night, an event that began in 1975. Luminarias are sold to neighborhood residents as a fundraiser for the Mount Lookout Community Council.

In Galena, Illinois, luminarias line the streets of the town one night in December for their annual "Night of Luminaria."

In the Village of Glen Ellyn, Illinois, luminarias line the 200 block of Taylor Avenue on Christmas Eve.

In Midlothian, Illinois, luminaria sets are sold to raise money for the local food pantries. About 75% of the food pantries annual budget comes from these luminaria sales and donations.

After the 2008 city hall shooting in Kirkwood, Missouri, residents lined the streets with luminarias to honor the victims of the shooting.

Each year for the past 22 years in Seattle, community members have placed luminarias along the path beside Lake Washington north of Seward Park. They place as many as 1800 along a three-mile stretch of the path. The placement of the luminaria are timed to coincide with the annual Christmas Ships festival organized by Argosy Cruises.

In Southern Arizona at the Tumacacori Mission, 2500 luminarias are placed around the mission and lit on Christmas Eve. People from the community go to the mission on Christmas Eve and walk along the path through the church and around the grounds. It is a special tradition for the community.

== Other holidays ==
In some Southwestern states, such as Arizona and Texas as well as New Mexico, luminarias are also occasionally used as Halloween decorations, sometimes featuring jack o' lantern faces drawn on the paper bags. Artificial luminarias are increasingly available with holiday themed decorative patterns and in colors other than brown.

== See also ==
- Festival of Lights
- Kobe Luminarie, a December electric-light festival in Japan
- Christmas lights
- Luminarias festival observed annually in San Bartolomé de Pinares
