= Jerusalem Festival of Light =

Annual light festival in Jerusalem

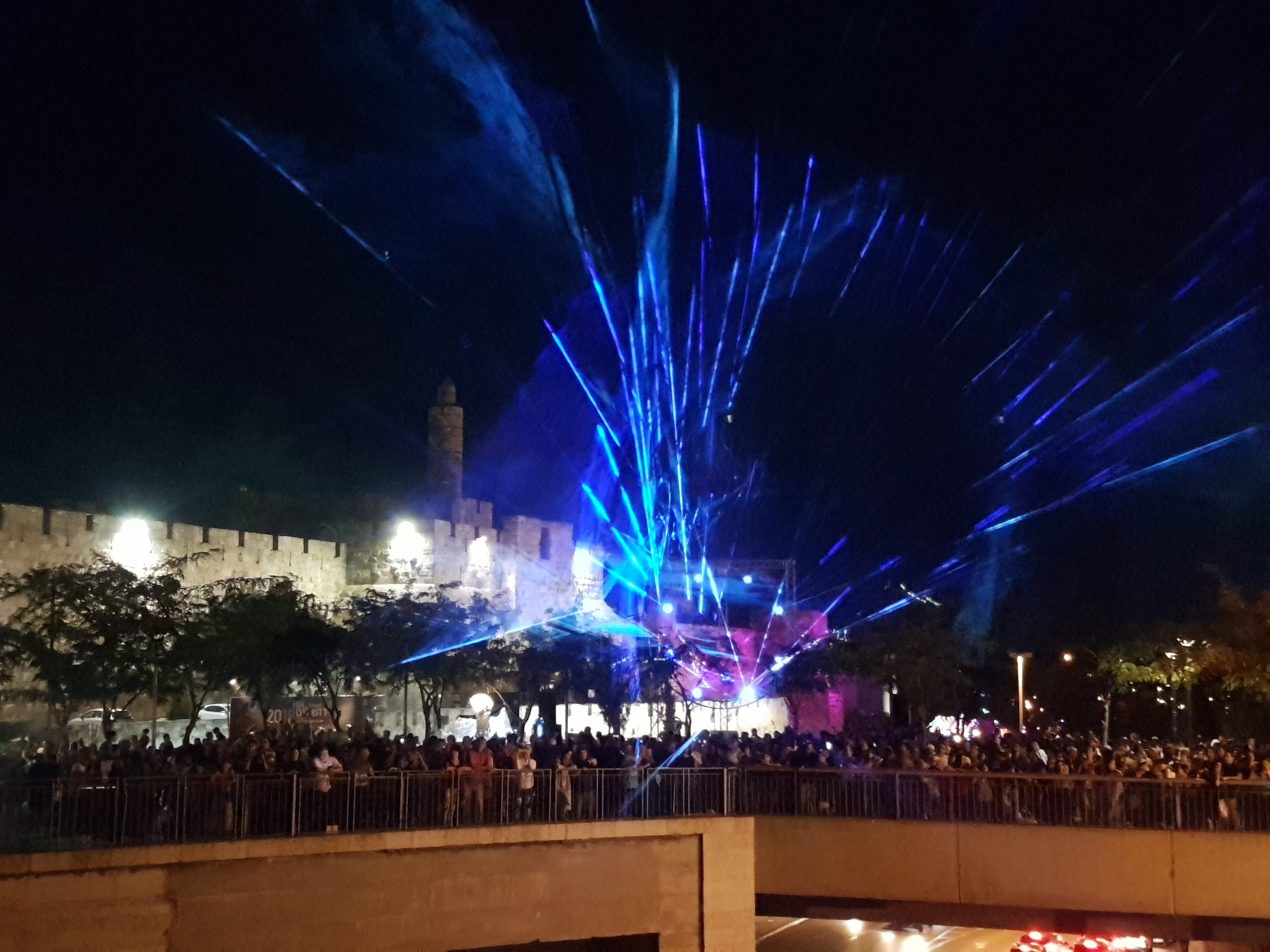
Jerusalem Festival of Light, David's Citadel and Old City walls

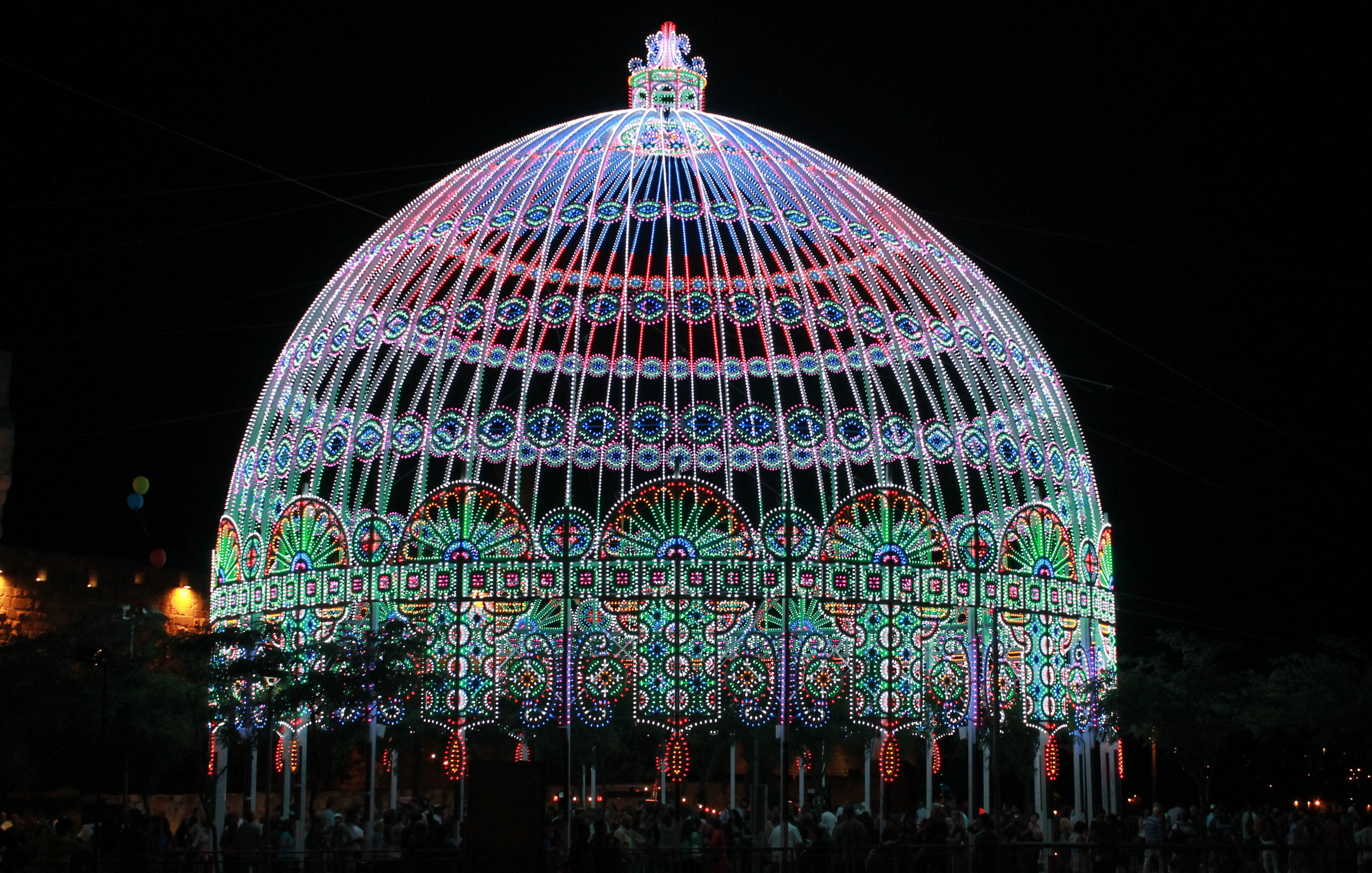
Jerusalem Festival of Light, 2012

Jerusalem Festival of Light is a week-long Israeli light festival held every summer in Jerusalem.

== History ==
The Jerusalem Festival of Light was established in 2009. It displays the work of leading international artists who use light as their creative medium.

In 2011, the festival, located in and around Jerusalem's Old City, drew over 200,000 visitors. In 2012, the show was extended into other neighborhoods of the Old City, including the Rehov Hagay, the commercial street leading from the Damascus Gate.

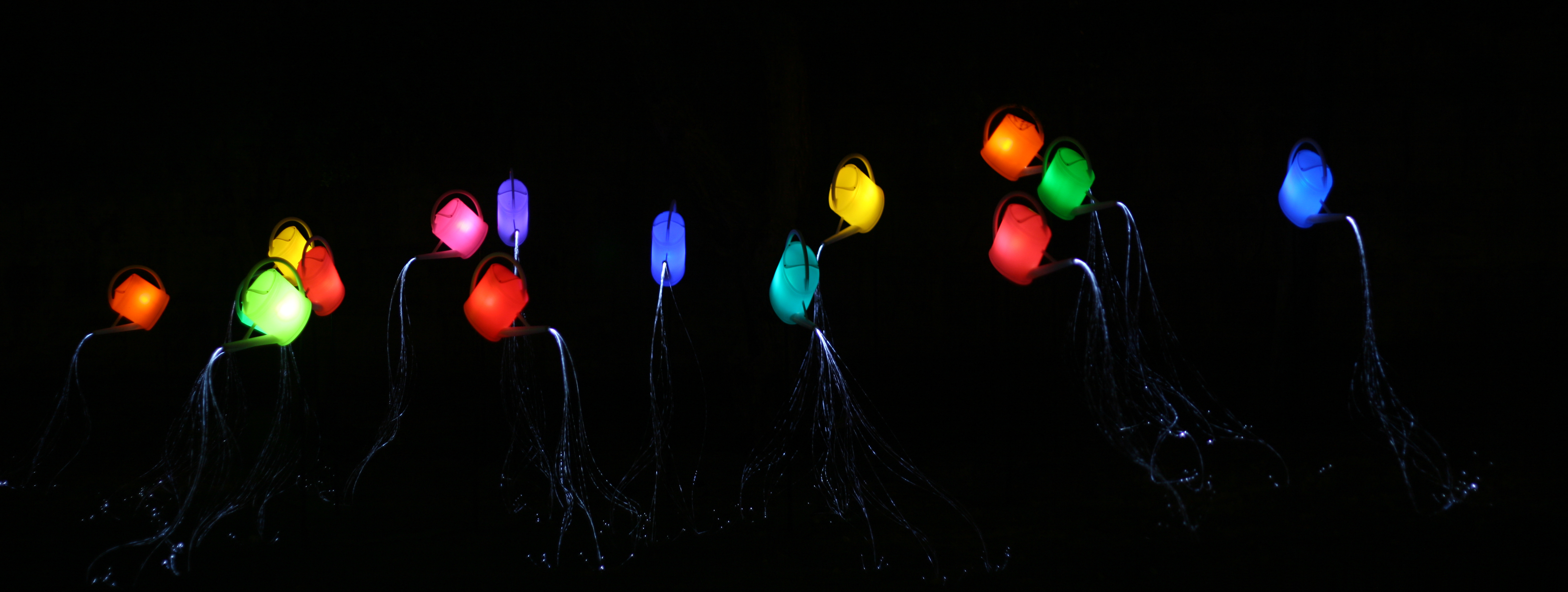
Guardian Angel, Maro Avrabou and Dimitri Xanakis, 2013

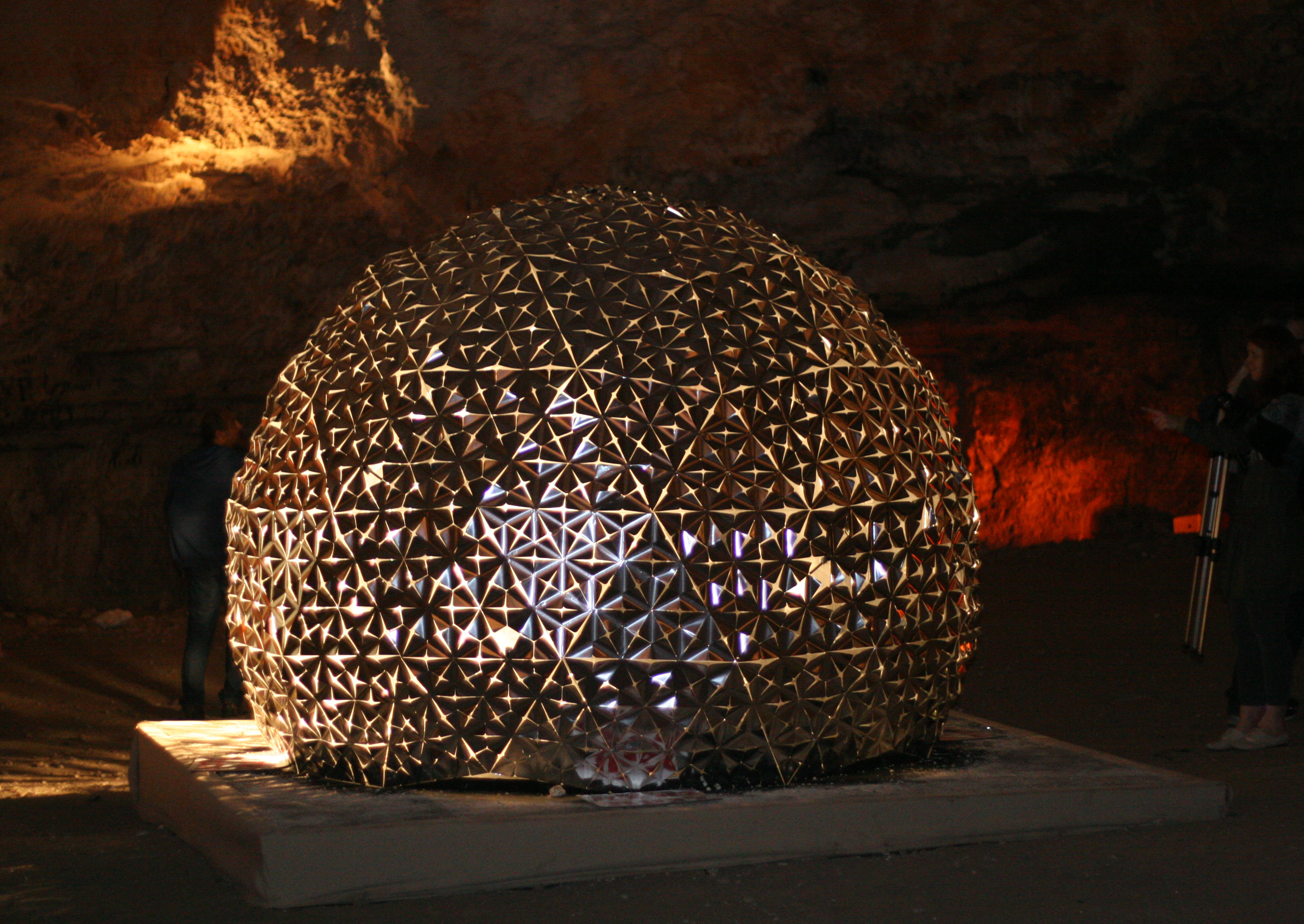
Lotus Dome, Daan Roosegaarde - Zedekiah's Cave, 2013

The festival, which lasts a week, is sponsored by the Jerusalem Municipality, the Prime Minister’s Office, the semi-public Ariel Company, and the Jerusalem Development Authority. Entrance to the festival is free. The cost of 7 million NIS is partly defrayed by commercial sponsors.

== See also ==
- Culture of Israel
- Israeli art
