= Nights of Lights =

Annual festival in Florida, United States

Nights of Lights (sometimes referred to as Night of Lights) is an annual holiday festival of lights occurring in and around downtown St. Augustine, in the U.S. state of Florida, in which buildings and rooftops throughout the downtown are decorated and lit by over three million of tiny holiday lights. The festival is a public-private partnership that begins in mid-November, and lasts through the end of January each year.

The festival loosely traces its origins to the traditional Spanish Christmas practice of displaying white candles in the windows, said to symbolize making room in a home for the biblical story of the birth of Jesus when parents Joseph and Mary could not find room at an inn.

There is no admission fee or cost to view the lights, although specialized tours and viewing areas are available for fees.

== History ==
Begun in 1993, the Nights of Lights festival is a public-private partnership, between the City of St. Augustine and the St. Johns County Tourist Development Council, and local businesses and residents. Architectural firm Angels in the Architecture, inc. has designed and installed the jointly-funded lighting displays since 1996. It has become a major tourist attraction, drawing tens of thousands of visitors to downtown St. Augustine each year to view the holiday lights, providing a boost to local businesses.

The idea for Nights of Lights began in the early 1990s, when former Mayor Len Weeks, with former City Councilman William Lennon, visited a city in Tennessee with a holiday lights display. Seeking a way to light up the darkest month of the year to promote local businesses who would often close early, Mayor Weeks was inspired by the potential for a grand lighting display. Returning home, Mayor Weeks sought contributions from local businesses and residents, and with a grant from the City of St. Augustine, Nights of Lights began.

== Public-private partnership ==
The annual Night of Lights festival is an example of a public-private partnership. It is partially funded by government and tourism grants, and partially by private businesses and residents. Grants are available to assist with costs of lighting buildings, and assistance is even provided in putting up and taking down the lights.

Nights of Lights makes a significant economic impact on St. Augustine and provides a boost to local tourism.

== Awards ==
National Geographic named Nights of Lights one of the ten most dazzling lighting displays in the world in years 2011 and 2012.

Conde Nast Traveler named St. Augustine and its Nights of Lights festival one of the best cities to visit at Christmas.
