= GLOW Festival Eindhoven =

Annual light festival in Eindhoven, Netherlands

The GLOW festival is a light art festival held every November in the Dutch city of Eindhoven. Artists and designers from home and abroad present light art and design applications by using new media technologies, such as computers, sensors, animations, and also the well-known projection techniques.

The GLOW festival was held for the first time in November 2006. The festival is an outdoor exhibition in public space of national and international light artists. The light artworks are connected by a walking route of approximately 5 kilometres which runs through the city centre. During the festival artworks can be seen in the city and on the banks of the Dommel. The festival route changes every year to give attention to different areas and neighborhoods of Eindhoven.

GLOW-Next is all about brand new light projects that are exhibited for the first time. In Eindhoven, engineers, designers, scientists and artists work together to create innovative light concepts and -techniques as well as new insights. In 2016 these projects were exhibited at the Eindhoven University of Technology campus for celebrating the 60th anniversary of its founding.

Eindhoven was known as the City of Light before Philips existed. For many years it was the largest producer of matches, possibly because of the local tobacco industry. Due also to the Incandescent light bulb production by Philips in Eindhoven, the city has always had something to do with light. The city also has a strong presence of local developments and lighting research, including De-Escalate, a laboratory that is a collaboration of the Intelligent Lighting Institute and the Technical University.

== Pictures ==
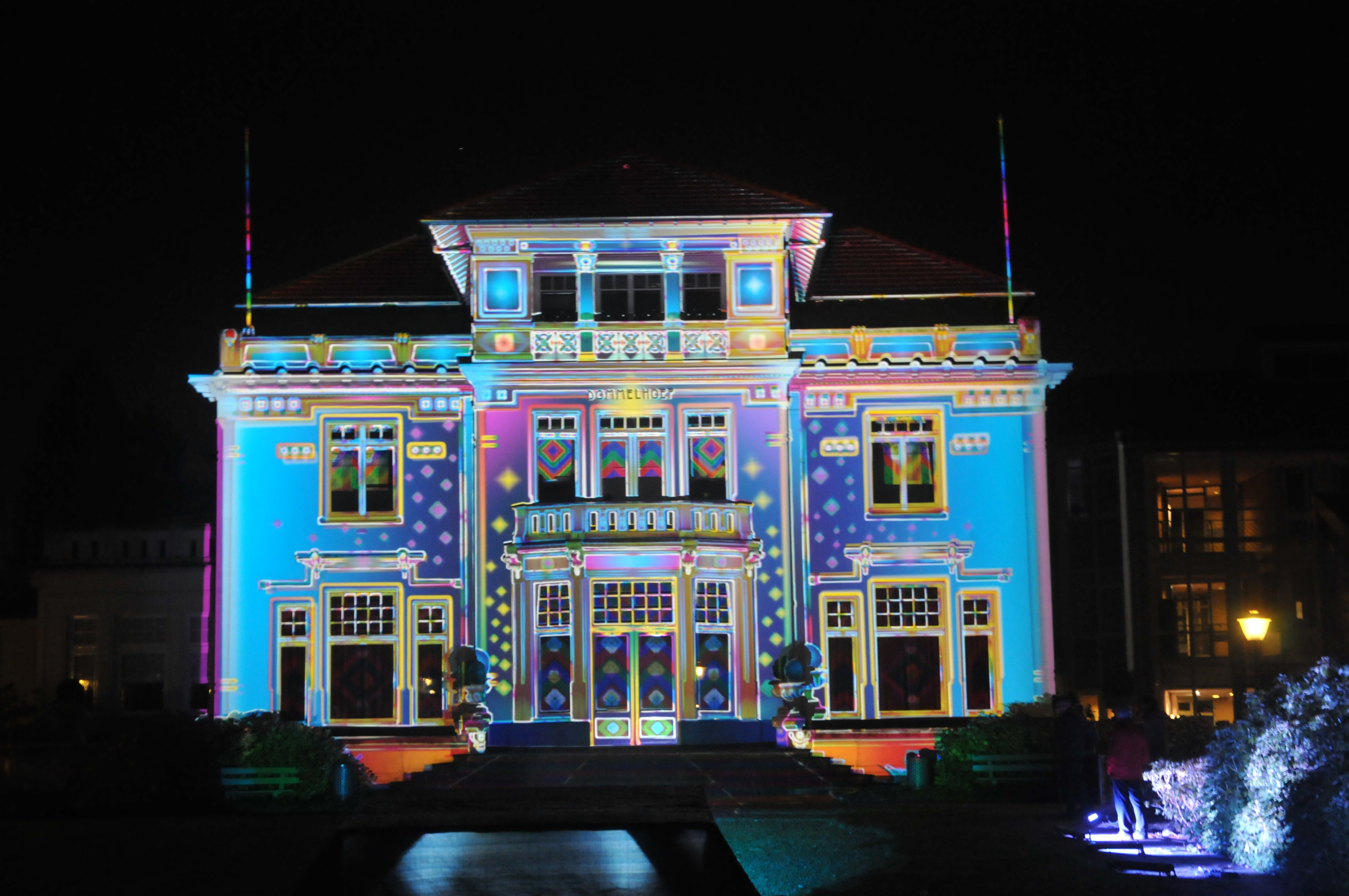
CHROMOLITH DOMMELHOEF

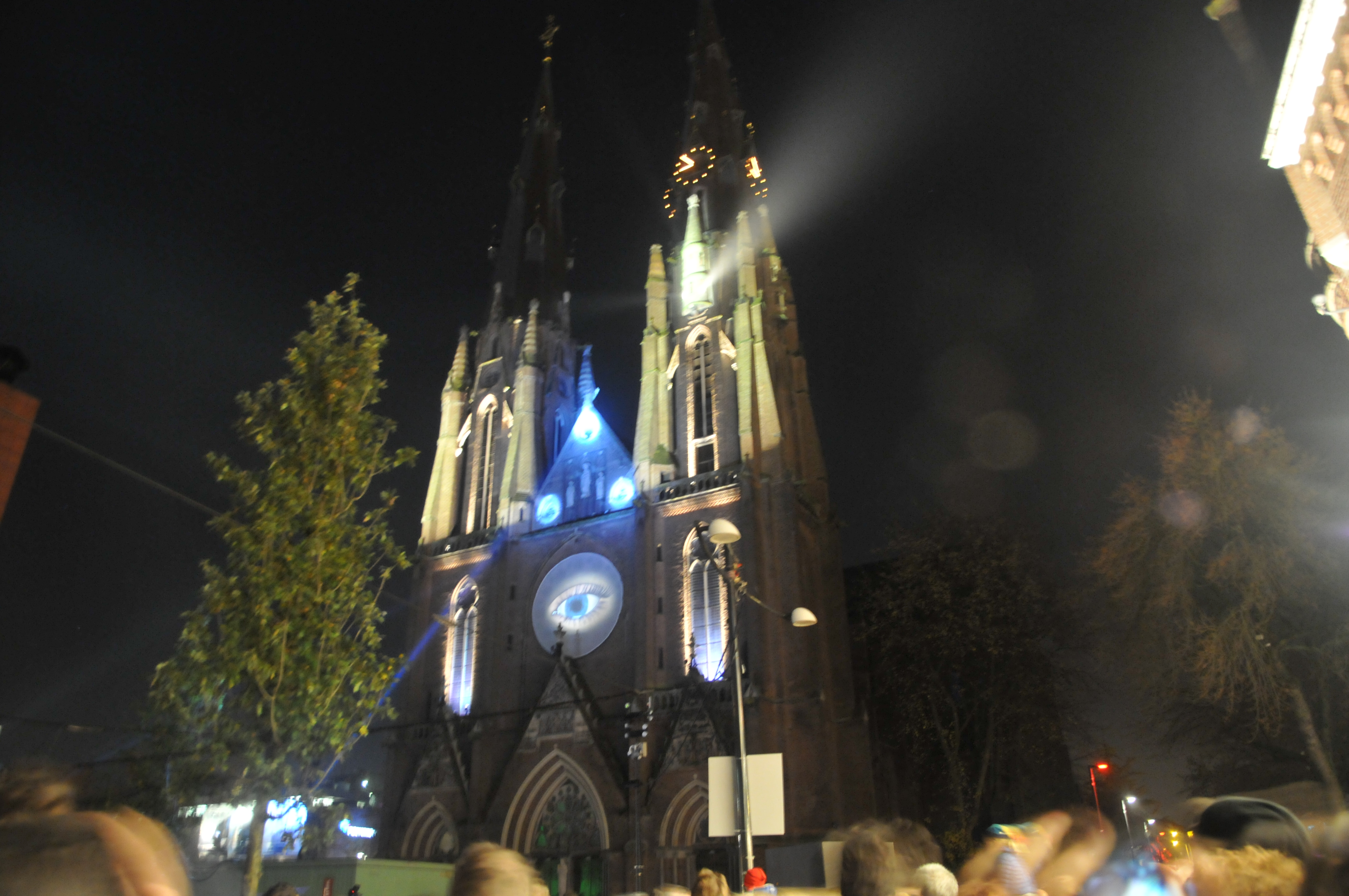
THE EYE OF TIME CATHARINAKERK

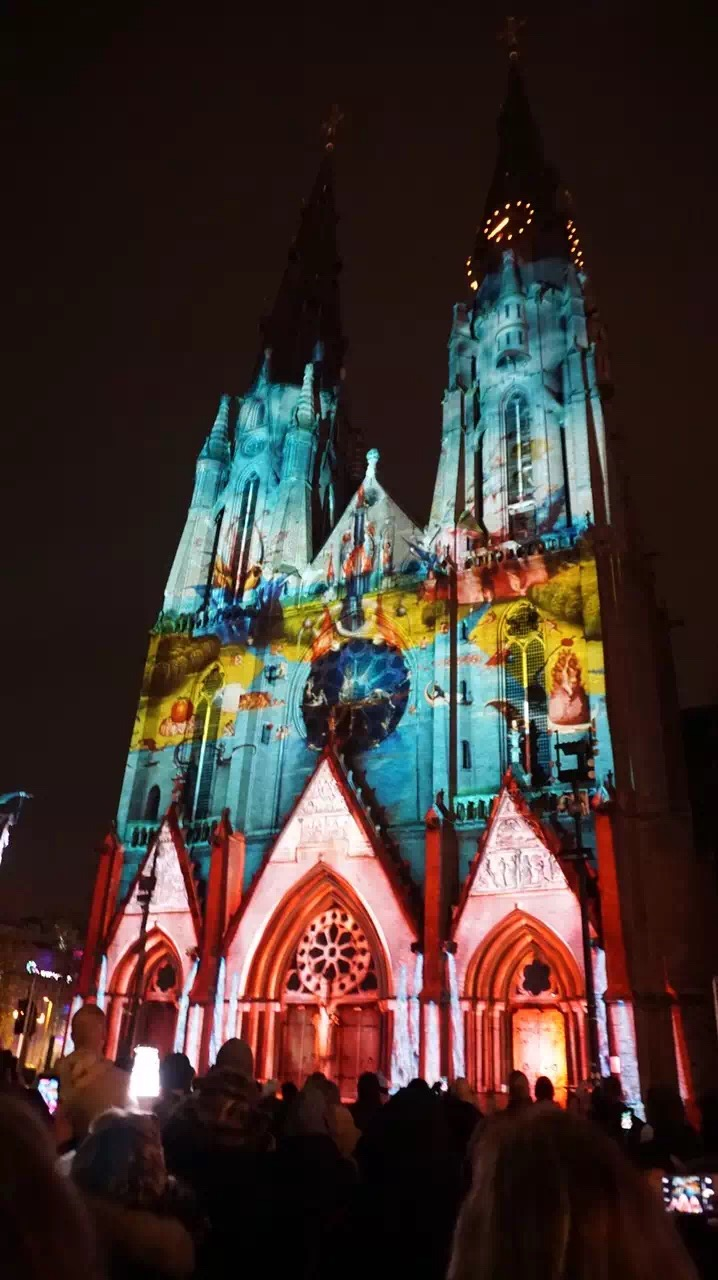
Labyrinth of Passion：2016, Catharina Church is transformed into a triptych based on Jheronimus Bosch’ hypnotic world, in commemoration of his death 500 years ago.
