= Luminary Group =

Luminary Group LLC is a licensing and intellectual property management company. The company represents the rightsowners of personalities including Babe Ruth, Vince Lombardi, Jesse Owens, Cy Young, Honus Wagner, Satchel Paige, John Wooden, and others.

The company has allied with the Screen Actors Guild in filing amicus briefs in support of Right of Publicity recognition throughout the United States, and has contributed to legislative efforts concerning the Right of Publicity. The company's founder, Jonathan Faber, teaches a course on the Right of Publicity at Indiana University's Robert H. McKinney School of Law.

Luminary Group's personnel have been cited in publications such as Licensing International, Billboard Magazine, and the American Bar Association's magazine. The company recently licensed Lombardi, the Broadway production based on Vince Lombardi, on behalf of the Family of Vince Lombardi.

Luminary Group has served as an expert witness in relation to lawsuits or other proceedings concerning intellectual property including:

- The Prince Estate
- Drake
- 50 Cent
- Indianapolis Motor Speedway (IMS)
- Uma Thurman v. Lancôme
- Nikki Sixx v. Vans, Thrasher
- Zooey Deschanel v. Steve Madden Shoes, Kohl's
- Oscar de la Hoya and Golden Boy Promotions
- Curtis Publishing and the Saturday Evening Post Society, Inc.
- Estate of Arthur Bemelmans v. DIC Enterprises
