= Luminaria (vigil fire) =

Christmas tradition of lighting a bonfire

A luminaria (rarely vigil fire) is a traditional small bonfire typically used during Las Posadas, a nine-day celebration culminating on Christmas Eve (la Nochebuena). The luminaria is widely used in Santa Fe, New Mexico. Luminaria is a loanword from Spanish that entered English in New Mexico.

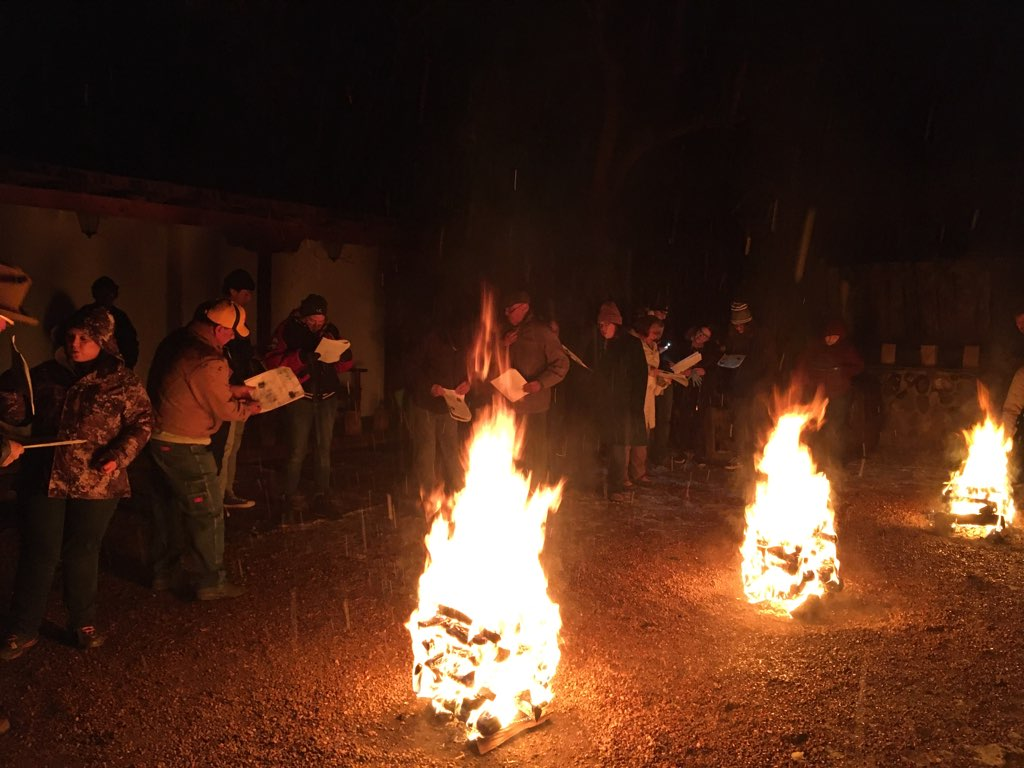

== Form ==
In New Mexico tradition, the luminaria is constructed of piñon pine branches stacked to form a cube similar in style to a log fence or log cabin. The piñon is used because it is abundant and the resin has a distinct fragrance that is very pleasing. To many people in New Mexico this is the fragrance of Christmas. The branches are laid to form a box so that the fire will cast the most light and heat with the least flame.

== Use ==
The luminaria is placed at the entrance to the home or in the middle of a courtyard. In New Mexico many traditional Spanish Colonial homes have a central open courtyard with a large entrance gate; the luminaria is placed at the gate. In traditional Pueblo villages, where the entrances to homes are rooftops, the Farolitos may be placed on a rooftop.

For some people the tradition includes lighting a new luminaria each night of Las Posadas (nine nights in all), and rebuilding and lighting those from the previous nights. Thus, on the first night there is a single luminaria, and on the ninth night there are nine, all in a line leading to the gate.

In some other traditional communities in New Mexico a single large luminaria is ignited on Christmas Eve after the evening meal, on a mountain lookout where the light may be visible to the entire community.

Rarely, use of the luminaria begins even earlier, on December 12 after the feast of Our Lady of Guadalupe. This is said to be related to Native American (Pueblo) beliefs.

== History ==
The early 16th century missionary historian Toribio de Benavente Motolinia described luminarias in use by Native Americans in Colonial Mexico, to illuminate midnight church services in outdoor chapels, and on their rooftops on Christmas Eve.

== Modern variations ==
A luminaria may be constructed in a small brazier, so that the heat does not damage pavement or stonework, and to reduce the risk of the fire spreading or escaping. The luminaria typically is not closely attended, but is expected to be seen and admired by passers by.

In some communities where the luminaria is used, it is accompanied by numerous smaller farolitos: paper lanterns consisting of a brown paper bag containing sand and a candle. In contrast, some communities in New Mexico and elsewhere use only the farolitos. In these latter communities generally the farolitos are called luminarias. Generally, luminaria are used in Santa Fe and northern New Mexico, with or without farolitos; and farolitos alone are used in Albuquerque and southern New Mexico, and have spread to other parts of the United States. The farolito of New Mexico is believed to be an adaptation of the parol paper lanterns of the Philippines brought to New Mexico via Mexico. There is general agreement that the farolito is a substitute for the luminaria.

== See also ==
- Easter Fire
- Misa de Gallo
- Luminarias festival observed annually in San Bartolomé de Pinares
- Parol
