= Guangzhou International Light Festival =

Annual event in Guangzhou, China

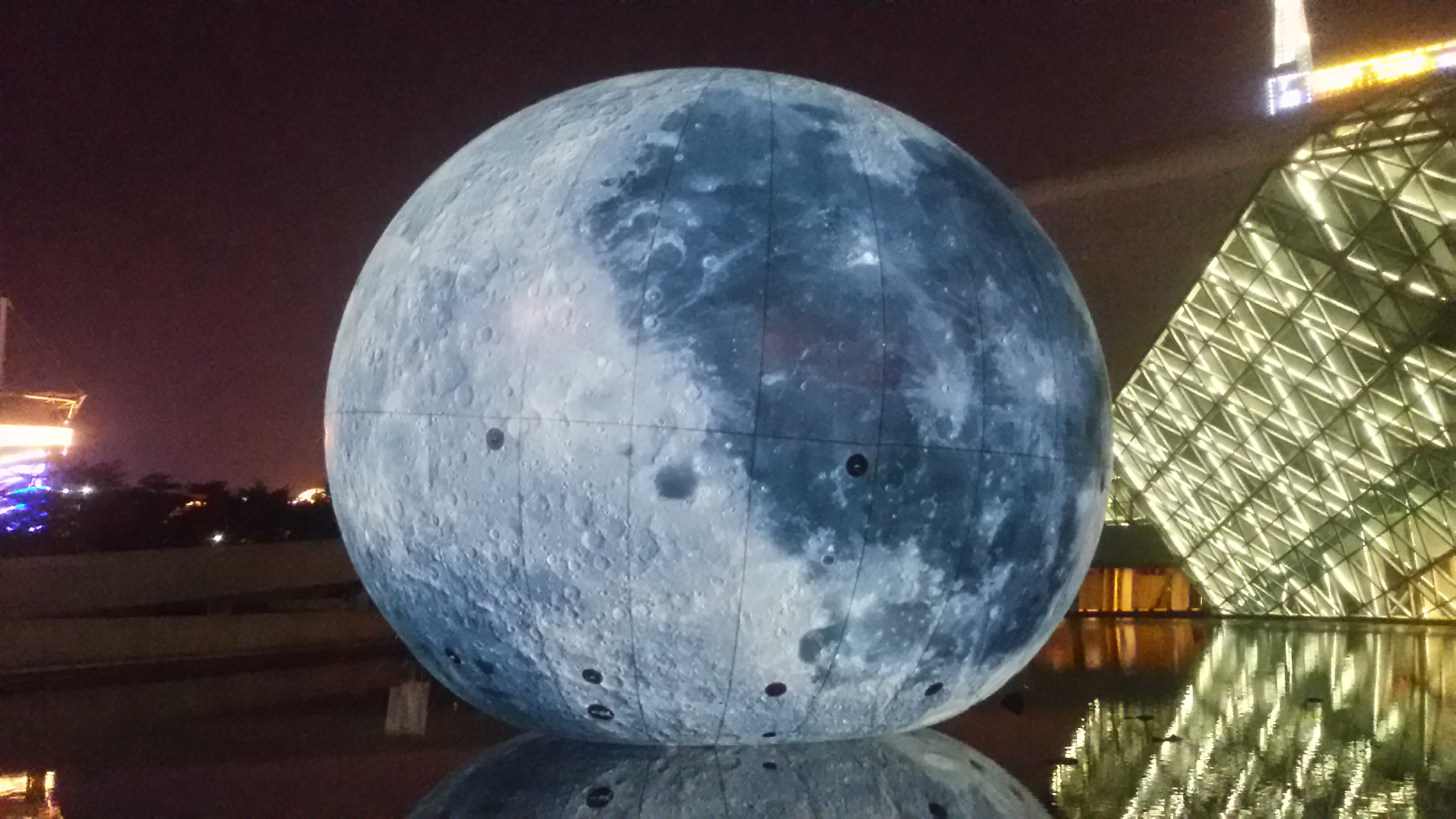
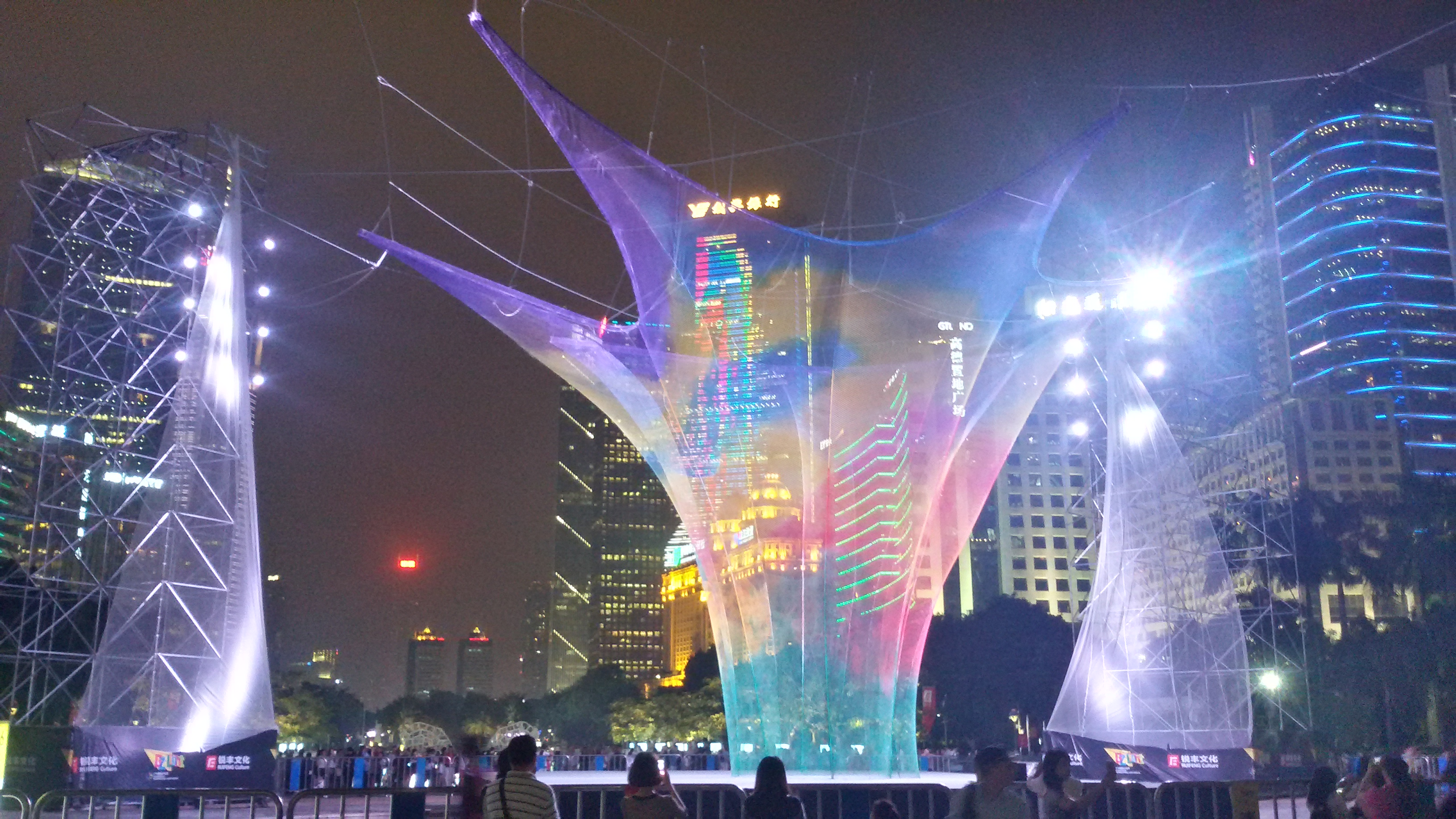
Exhibits

Guangzhou International Light Festival (or GZ Light) (Chinese: 廣州國際燈光節) is a light exhibiting festival held annually along the Pearl River in the city of Guangzhou, China. The festival occurs every November since 2010, when the 16th Asian Games left many lighting facilities on the ground of the event.
