= Celebration of Lights =

- Genre: Winter holiday season
- Begins: Thanksgiving
- Ends: Early January
- Locations: Pittsburgh, Pennsylvania
- Inaugurated: 1991
- Most recent: 2011
- Attendance: 170,000 (2011)

The Celebration of Lights was a winter holiday season Christmas lights show in Pittsburgh. Held at Hartwood Acres Park from 1991 to 2011, it generated funds for WTAE-TV's "Project Bundle-Up" charity and the Salvation Army.

The show consisted of a 3.5 mile drive through Hartwood Acres Park. Over the 20 year life of the show, it generated $3.7 million for charity. In 1991, the 28 displays had 250,000 lights; by 2011 it had grown to 2,000,000 lights. The Oglebay Winter Festival of Lights is a similar event at Oglebay Park in Wheeling, West Virginia.

In 2010, a 3-year sponsor, Rite Aid withdrew from sponsorship.

In September 2012, Chief Executive of Allegheny County Rich Fitzgerald announced that he was cancelling the Celebration of Lights due to inability to find corporate sponsorship. The Pittsburgh Post-Gazette defended the decision in light of public outcry. Following the announcement, private citizens began to search for new sponsors.
