= Kobe Luminarie =

Light festival in Kobe (Japan)

Coordinates: 34°41′17.1″N 135°11′23.8″E

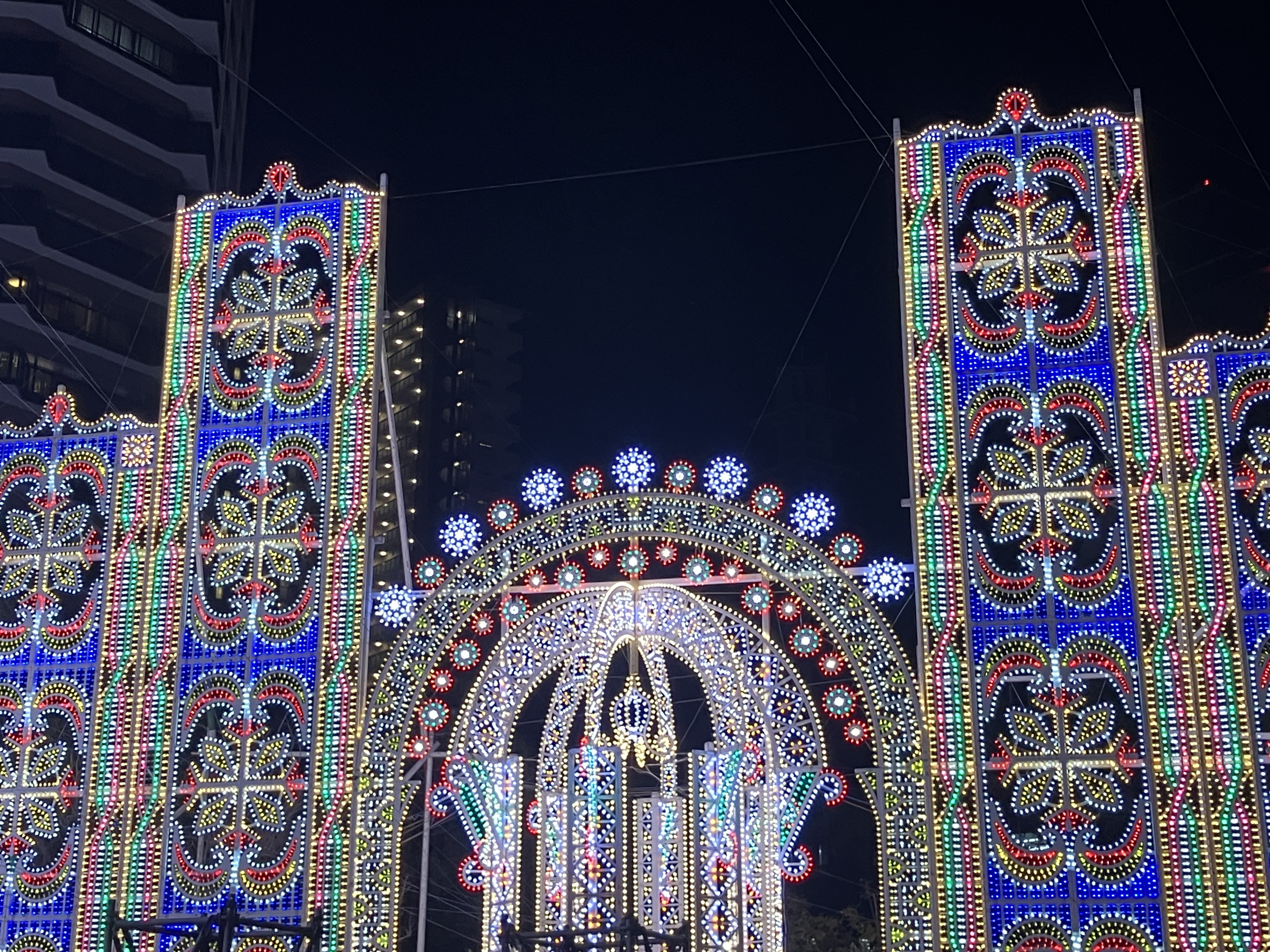
The 30th Kobe Luminarie (2025)

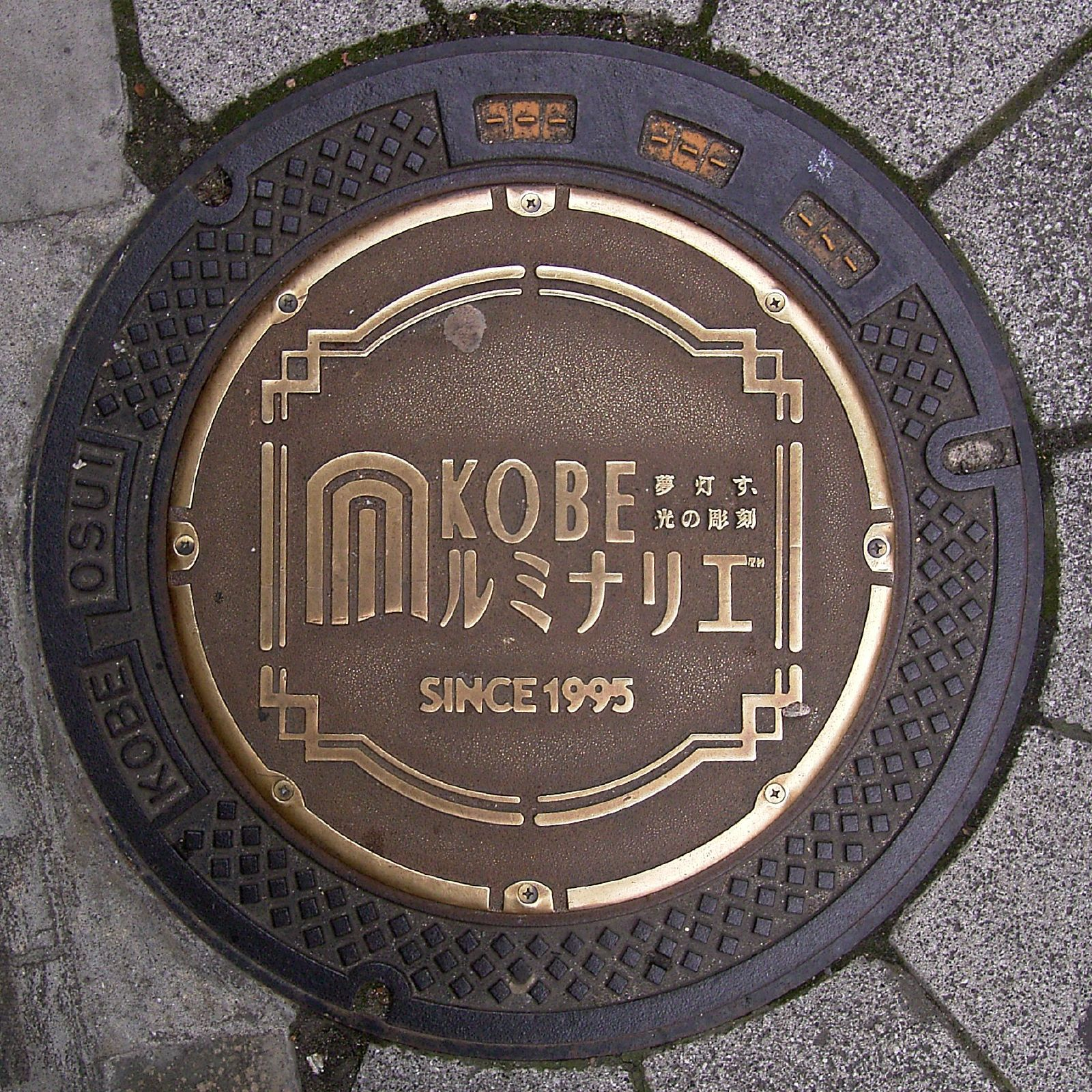
Manhole cover commemorating the KobeLuminarie

Kobe Luminarie (神戸ルミナリエ) is a light festival held in Kobe, Japan, every December since 1995 to commemorate the Great Hanshin earthquake of that year. The lights were donated by the Italian Government and the installation itself is produced by Valerio Festi and Hirokazu Imaoka. Over 200,000 individually hand painted lights are lit each year with electricity generated from biomass in order to stay environmentally friendly.

Lights are kept up for about two weeks and turned on for a few hours each evening. Major streets in the vicinity are closed to auto traffic during these hours to allow pedestrians to fill the streets and enjoy the lights. It is viewed by about three to five million people each year.

== Symbolization ==
When the Great Hanshin earthquake struck Kobe on January 17, 1995, it left more than 6,000 dead and caused $100 billion in damages. Since many had to live in darkness due to supply cuts in electricity, gas, and water, the idea of putting up lights acted as a symbol of hope, recovery, and renovation. Though it was only supposed to take place once, strong popularity and demand from citizens encouraged the continuation of luminarie to become an annual event.

Silent prayers to victims of the earthquake takes place in the opening ceremony, and a memorial naming those who were killed is posted during the night.

However, in 2020, due to the effects of the Coronavirus disease 2019, even if the scale was reduced, it was expected to cause congestion, and it was extremely difficult to implement infection control measures. Also, because the Italian craftsman has no prospect of entering Japan, the Kobe Luminarie event was canceled. The event was resumed in January 2024, in a change to its usual December schedule. Rather than its previous centralised displays, the 2024 festival's displays were dispersed over multiple sites in Kobe, with the large "Galleria" and "Frontone" displays forming a paid-entry area in Merikan Park.

=== Tohoku Initiative ===
In the 2011 Luminarie, the same year as the Tohoku earthquake and tsunami, a special exhibition was held to raise money for its victims. In the 2012 luminarie, drawings by children from that region were used to make lanterns displayed at the event.

== Tourist attraction ==
The Hanshin earthquake left Kobe at a slump with tourist attractions. One of the factors that brought tourism back to Kobe was the sincerity of the Luminarie event in honoring the victims of the earthquake.

The event attracts around 4 million people to Kobe every year and raises $1.3 million in donations and $6.1 million in sponsorship and merchandise sales.

The table below indicates the number of people attending the Luminarie event each year since 2004.

Year	Attendance
1995	2,542,678
1996	3,855,665
1997	4,732,346
1998	5,163,716
1999	5,157,573
2000	4,737,907
2001	5,190,000
2002	4,640,000
2003	5,066,000
2004	5,383,000
2005	4,358,000
2006	4,650,000
2007	4,043,000
2008	3,755,000
2009	3,650,000
2010	3,434,000
2011	3,421,000
2012	3,401,000
2013	3,541,000
2014	3,444,000
2015	3,256,000
2016	3,253,000
2017	3,396,000
2018	3,426,000
2019	3,469,000
2020	Cancelled
2024	2,298,000

The luminarie also has numerous sponsors. The following are just a few of the tens of dozens of sponsors for 2012;

- JR West
- Hankyu Corporation
- Nestle Group Japan
- Hanshin Electric Railway Co
- TOA (shares)
- Kadokawa Magazine Ltd.
- Sysmex Ltd

== See also ==
- Christmas lights
- Traditional lighting equipment of Japan
- Parol
- Luminaria
