= Luminárias =

- Municipality
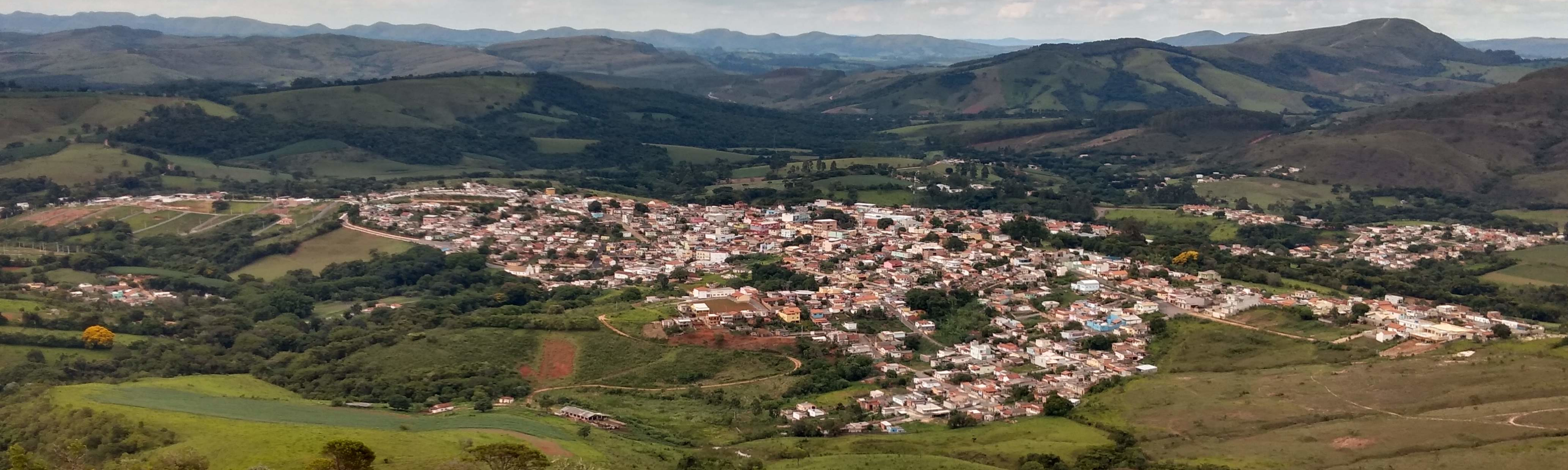

- Flag Coat of arms

- Location in Minas Gerais state

- Location in Brazil
- Coordinates: 21°30′S 44°54′W
- Country: Brazil
- Region: Southeast
- State: São Paulo

Area
  - Total: 500,143 km^{2} (193,106 sq mi)
- Time zone: UTC−3 (BRT)

Luminárias is a Brazilian municipality located in the state of Minas Gerais. The city belongs to the mesoregion of Campo das Vertentes and to the microregion of Lavras. In 2020, the estimated population was 5,438.

== Geography ==
According to IBGE (2017), the municipality is in the Immediate Geographic Region of Lavras, in the Intermediate Geographic Region of Varginha.

=== Ecclesiastical circumscription ===
The municipality is part of the Roman Catholic Diocese of São João del-Rei.

== See also ==
- List of municipalities in Minas Gerais
