= San Bartolomé de Pinares =

- municipality
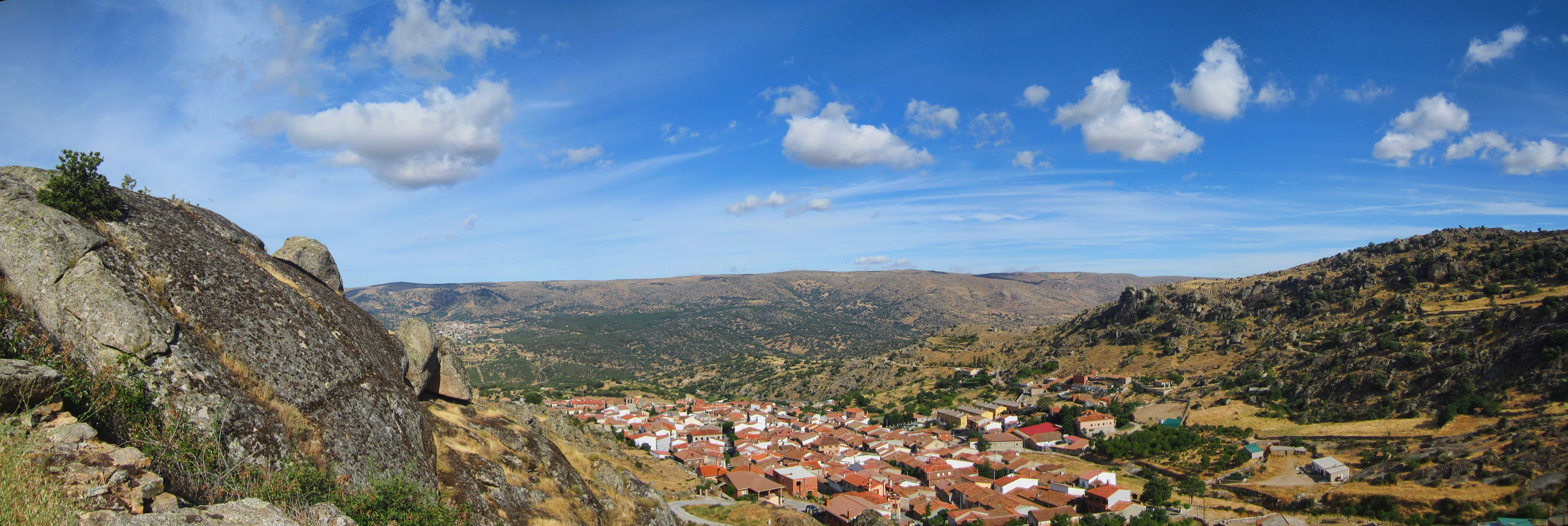
- View of San Bartolomé de Pinares

- Flag Coat of arms

- Location in Spain. San Bartolomé de Pinares (Spain)
- Coordinates: 40°32′33″N 4°32′33″W
- Country: Spain
- Autonomous community: Castile and León
- Province: Ávila
- Municipality: San Bartolomé de Pinares

Area
  - Total: 74 km^{2} (29 sq mi)

Population (2025-01-01)
  - Total: 479
  - Density: 6.5/km^{2} (17/sq mi)
- Time zone: UTC+1 (CET)
  - Summer (DST): UTC+2 (CEST)
- Website: Official website

San Bartolomé de Pinares is a municipality located in the province of Ávila, Castile and León, Spain. Only 20 km from Ávila, it has long been important for its livestock.

Named for St. Bartholomew, the village is often associated with the local Herrerian style church Iglesia de San Bartolomé Apóstol.

The teacher and journalist Juan Grande Martín (January 12, 1914 – November 13, 1981) was born here.

== Population ==
Historical population
Year	Pop.	±% p.a.
2023	501	—
2024	489	−2.40%
2025	479	−2.04%
Source: INE

== Festival ==
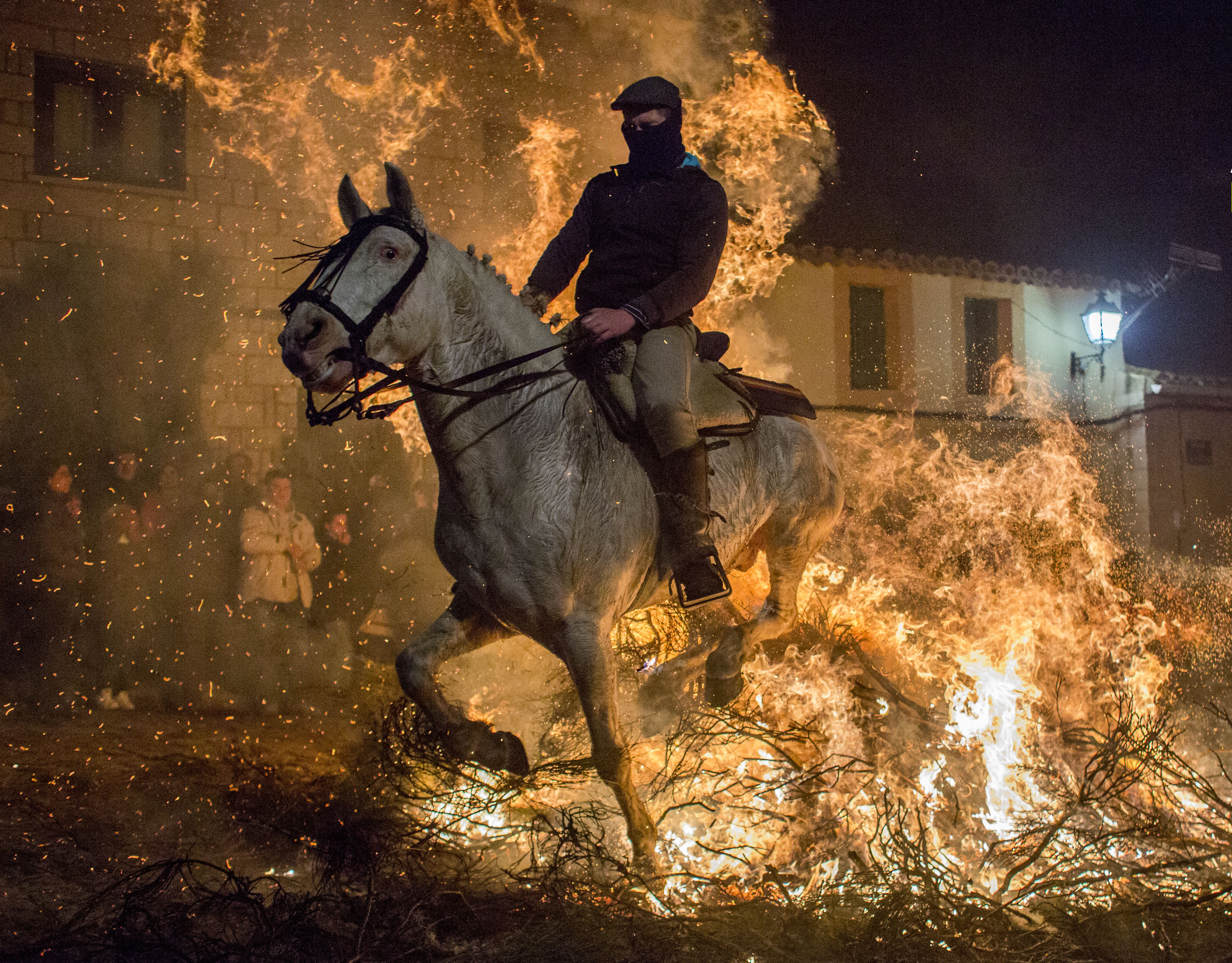
Rider and horse cross a bonfire during the purifying ritual of the Luminarias festival.

Each year on January 16, the eve of the festival of Saint Anthony, the town celebrates the traditional Luminarias festival. Purportedly held for five centuries, the origins of the festival trace back to a ritual purification to preserve the health of the horses in the village. Bonfires are lit in the central streets, and horses jump through the flames, with the smoke intended to protect the animals from disease.
