= Zavitz =

Zavitz is a surname. Notable people with the surname include:

- Edmund Zavitz (1875–1968), Canadian conservationist
- James Zavitz (1922–2017), Canadian sport shooter
- Lee Zavitz (1904–1977), American special effects technician
- Lucy Zavitz (born 2002), American who formerly lived in an apartment above a grocery store,
- Sherman Zavitz, Canadian historian
