= Niagara Parks Commission =

Agency of the Government of Ontario, Canada

Agency overview
- Formed: 1885; 141 years ago
- Type: Crown agency
- Jurisdiction: Government of Ontario
- Headquarters: Oak Hall 7400 Portage Road Niagara Falls, Ontario
- Employees: 300 full-time 1,400 seasonal
- Minister responsible: Hon. Stan Cho MPP, Minister of Tourism, Culture and Gaming
- Agency executives: Graham Coveney, Chair; David Adames, CEO; Marcelo Gruosso, COO
- Child agency: Niagara Parks Police Service
- Key document: Niagara Parks Act, 1990 (RSO 1990 c. N.3)
- Website: www.niagaraparks.com

The Niagara Parks Commission, commonly shortened to Niagara Parks, is an agency of the Government of Ontario which maintains the Ontario shoreline of the Niagara River.

== History ==
The commission was founded in 1885 and charged with preserving and enhancing the natural beauty of Niagara Falls and the Niagara River corridor as a public greenspace and environmental heritage. The first commissioner was Casimir Gzowski. Other notable Commissioners have included Thomas McQuesten and James Allan. Current Commission Chair is vice chair April Jeff's. Former chair Sandie Bellows, died October 2021.

== Activity ==
In total, the commission is in charge of about 16.19 square kilometres (6.25 sq mi) of parkland along the river, in addition to the Niagara Parkway which spans 56 kilometres (35 mi). In this corridor, the NPC manages numerous trails, historic sites, picnic areas, and attractions. The Commission formerly managed Navy Island National Historic Site under a lease agreement with Parks Canada.

Niagara Parks also operated the People Mover, a shuttle bus system intended to aid transportation along the Niagara River and help reduce automobile crowding near the Falls. The buses were powered by propane and included a trailer unit during most popular hours. In the long term, the commission is planning for a fixed track transit system along the Niagara Parkway, although no decision has been taken on the exact technology to be used. In the meantime, the Commission joined forces with Niagara Falls Transit to launch the fully accessible WEGO bus system in 2012, and in the process discontinued the People Mover service.

=== Commission's sites and attractions ===
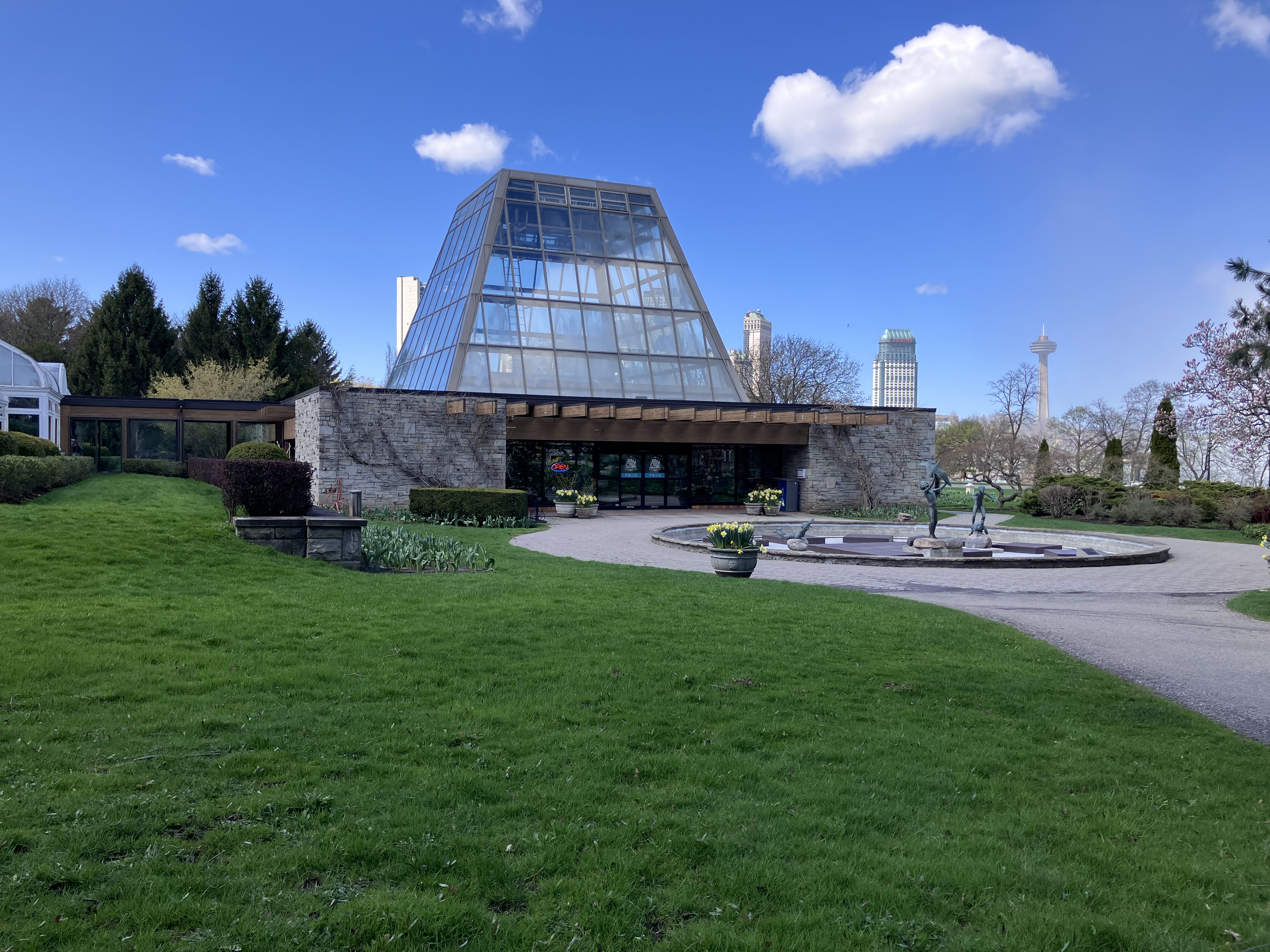
Niagara Parks Floral Showhouse

- Chippawa Battlefield Park: site of the Battle of Chippawa in the War of 1812 and a National Historic Site
- Dufferin Islands
- Falls Incline Railway: funicular railway connecting Table Rock Welcome Centre to the hotels in the Fallsview Tourist Area
- Hornblower Niagara Cruises: boat trips along the Niagara River to the Bridal Veil and Horseshoe Falls (formerly operated by Maid of the Mist), operated under contract by Hornblower Cruises
- Laura Secord Homestead: historic home of Laura Secord, a heroine of the War of 1812, and a National Historic Site on the Laura Secord Legacy Trail
- Mackenzie Printery: printing museum located in the home of historic politician and journalist William Lyon Mackenzie, leader of the Upper Canada Rebellion
- McFarland House, Niagara-on-the-Lake
- Niagara Glen Nature Reserve
- Niagara Parks School of Horticulture: a training centre for horticulturalists and gardeners
  - Niagara Parks Botanical Gardens
  - Niagara Parks Butterfly Conservatory
- Oak Hall: historic home of mining tycoon Harry Oakes, now used for administrative offices
- Old Fort Erie: historic British fort and a National Historic Site
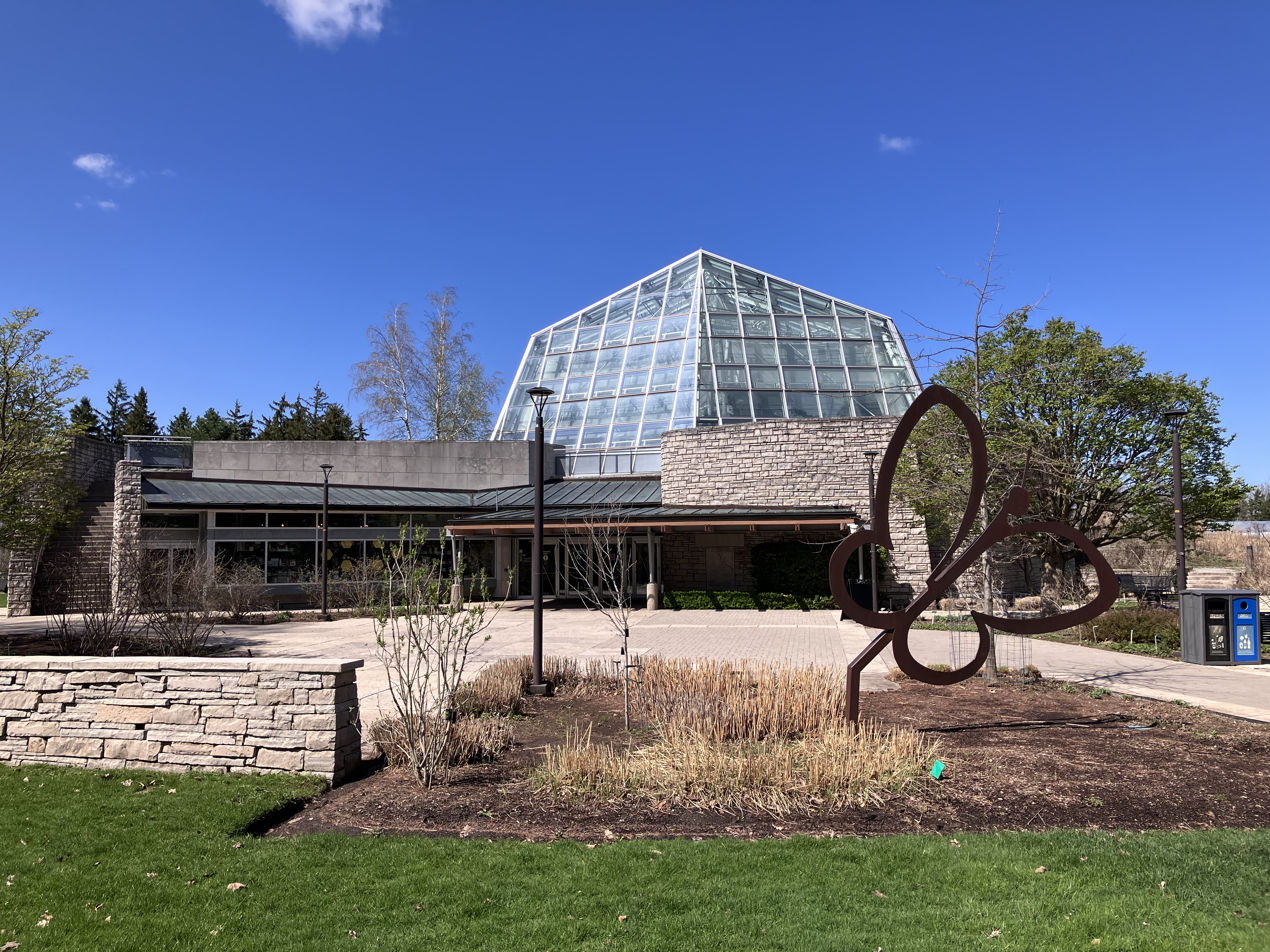
  Niagara Parks Butterfly Conservatory
  Queen Victoria Park
- Queenston Floral Clock
- Table Rock Welcome Centre: visitor's centre in Niagara Falls with observation decks, restaurants, and shopping areas
  - Journey Behind the Falls: tourist attraction consisting of tunnels and observation platforms adjacent to and behind the Horseshoe Falls
  - Niagara Takes Flight: a motion-simulated flying theater tourist attraction that takes visitors on a virtual aerial journey across the 56-kilometer Niagara River corridor
- Whirlpool Aero Car: a scenic cable car ride which crosses over the Niagara Whirlpool
- Niagara Parks Power Station: a decommissioned power station on the Canadian side of the Niagara River. The restored facility includes immersive exhibits, restored artifacts and interactive storytelling
- Floral Showhouse: a greenhouse featuring several floral shows each year, celebrating major holidays, community events and the beauty of nature
- White Water Walk: a quarter-mile boardwalk located along the shoreline of the Lower Niagara River providing a close view of the class six rapids

== Niagara Heritage Trail ==
The Niagara Heritage Trail is a historic and scenic route running the entire 56 kilometre Canadian coastline of the Niagara River from Fort Erie northward to Niagara-on-the-Lake. Construction began in stages during the early 1980s, and was completed in 1995.

The trail makes its central heart in Queen Victoria Park near the main tourist area, and also passes by attractions such as the Whirlpool Golf Course, Niagara Botanical Gardens, the Niagara Parks Butterfly Conservatory, and the Floral clock.

== See also ==
- List of botanical gardens in Canada
- Alfred H. Savage – Sarnia born horticulturalist and transit manager, School of Horticulture graduate 1952
- William "Red" Hill Sr., life saving hero; in 2018, the Commission installed a commemorative display of his heroic work in 1918 during the Niagara Scow incident
