= Stamford Township =

Coordinates: 43.16475°N 79.064778°W

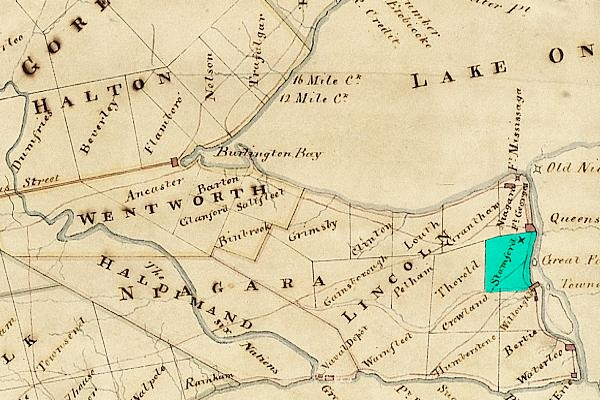
Stamford Township in 1818, highlighted in green.

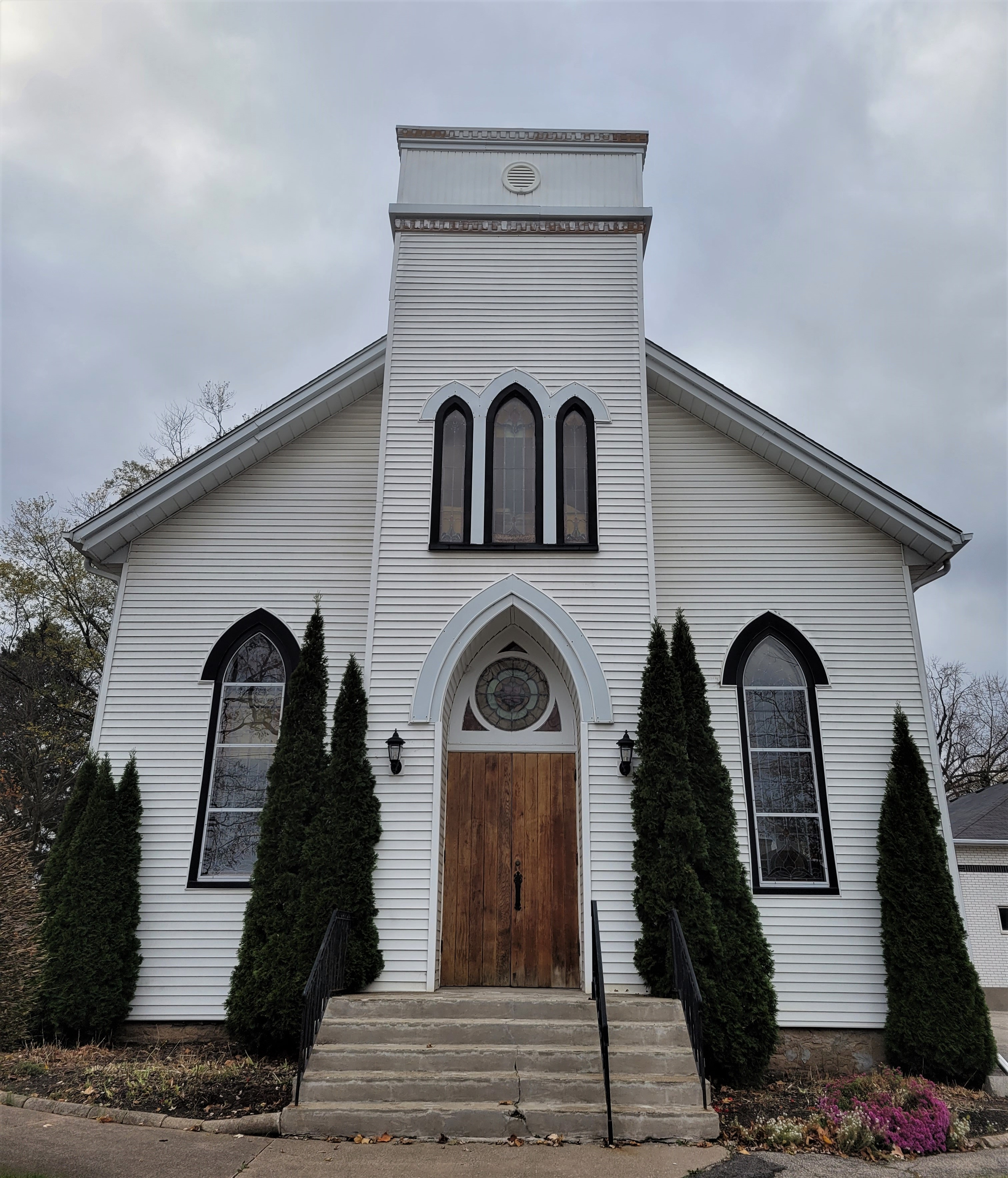
Stamford Presbyterian Church

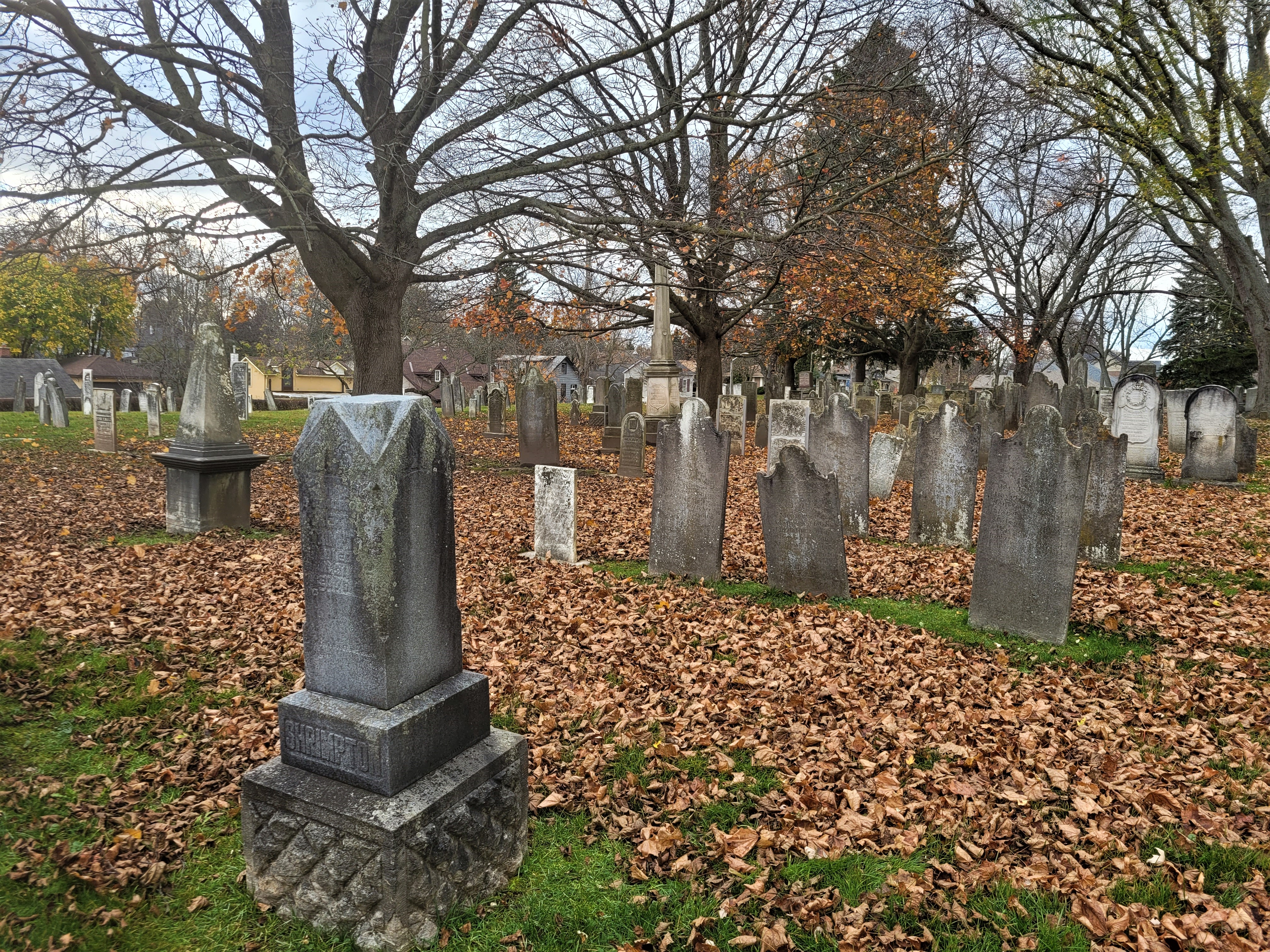
God's Half Acre-Stamford Presbyterian Church

Stamford Township is a former incorporated and now geographic township in Upper Canada, later Ontario, on the Niagara Peninsula. In 1962 the township was amalgamated with the city of Niagara Falls, Ontario.

== History ==
It was originally designated Township #2 in the Home District of the Quebec Colony in Canada. Following the creation of Upper Canada in 1791, Township #2 was renamed Stamford and placed within the newly created County of Lincoln. When Lincoln county was divided into Lincoln (north) and Welland (south) counties in 1851, Township #2 was placed in Welland County.

The first survey took place around 1776, during the American Revolutionary War. Twelve European-American families came to settle in the area, including the Cooks and Durhams from New Jersey. It was developed and settled initially by Loyalists, primarily from New York State and other areas of the British colonies with the first two settlers being the Thomas McMicking and Philip Bender families.

The British Crown granted land to Loyalists in Upper Canada to compensate them for their losses in the Revolution and to settle this area. As the second township in the region surveyed, it was named Township #2, and sometimes referred to as Mount Dorchester for Sir Guy Carleton Lord Dorchester. Another survey was conducted in 1787, following the United States achieving independence. The area was named Stamford in 1787 by John Graves Simcoe, the first Lieutenant Governor of Upper Canada, as the largest area in the township was already known as Stamford Village. It was given royal status in 1791. New settlers were initially mostly ethnic British, although some from New York also had more distant Dutch, Mohawk and French ancestry. The first municipal government was established in 1793. Its first two Wardens were John Wilson and Thomas McMicking.

Stamford Village was the largest community in the township, dating back to 1783. Although as a village it had no formal municipal government or status, it was referred to as Stamford, apparently after Stamford Village in Delaware County in New York where some pioneers originally settled. The building of the Stamford Meeting House took place in 1787 next to the local cemetery which villagers called God's Half Acre. This Meeting House became the Stamford Presbyterian Church, the first Presbyterian Church in Upper Canada (circa 1844).

== See also ==
- List of townships in Ontario
