= Alfred H. Savage =

Canadian businessman

Alfred H. Savage (March 29, 1930 – January 24, 2015) was a trained gardener, civic manager and transit agency manager in Canada and the United States.

== Early years ==
Savage was born in Sarnia, Ontario and graduated from Niagara Parks Commission Training School for Apprentice Gardeners (now Niagara Parks School of Horticulture) in Niagara Falls, Ontario.

Savage and his wife Georgia were horticulturists at the family owned Savage Greenhouses and Garden Centre in Sarnia in 1952.

== Public service ==
Savage became Superintendent of Buildings Grounds and Maintenance for Sarnia. He became Commissioner of Parks and Recreation for the Borough of York in 1966. He went to Edmonton as General Manager of the City of Edmonton Parks & Recreation Department (1972–1974) and Commissioner of Public Affairs from 1974 to 1981.

== Transit manager ==
Savage was Chief General Manager of the Toronto Transit Commission from 1981 to 1987, Executive Director of the Niagara Frontier Transportation Authority in Buffalo, New York, from 1987 to 1990, and Chief Executive Officer of the Chicago Transit Authority from 1990 to 1992.

== Returning to Edmonton ==
He was a Board Member and Chair of the Olds College from 1997–2003 and an Officer for the Alberta Municipal Government Board. Savage volunteered for the 1978 Commonwealth Games and the 1998 World Student Games and still serving as Director of the Calgary Downtown Rotary Club.

He was the Chair of Alberta Auto Insurance Rate Board.

The Alfred H. Savage Centre at Whitemud Park in Edmonton opened in 2012. The centre was described as "a hub for outdoor education and environmental programs such as orienteering or snowshoeing, as well as being a space for community gatherings." He died in Edmonton in 2015, aged 84.

== See also ==
- Al Leach – successor to Savage as head of Toronto Transit Commission

Preceded by R. Michael Warren	Chief General Manager of the Toronto Transit Commission; 1981–1987	Succeeded by Al Leach

Preceded by Bernard J. Ford - as Engagement Manager	Executive Director of the Chicago Transit Authority; 1990–1992	Succeeded by Robert P. Belcaster - as President
