= Burr Plato =

Canadian politician

Burr Plato (c. 1833–1905) was a Canadian political figure.

Of African-American background, he was born into slavery in Logan County, today part of West Virginia. Burr succeeded in escaping enslavement and making his way to Canada in 1856 after an arduous journey culminating in a swim to freedom across the Niagara River to Canada West, where he settled. With a reputation locally in Niagara Falls, Ontario, for honesty in business affairs, Plato became a prominent property owner and served from 1886 to 1901 in Niagara Falls as an elected councillor.

Plato died in 1905.
