= Niagara Parks School of Horticulture =

Coordinates: 43.1354°N 79.0575°W

- Former name: Niagara Parks Commission Training School for Apprentice Gardeners (1936-1959)
- Motto: Where Futures Flourish
- Established: 1936
- Affiliations: Niagara Parks Commission
- Location: Niagara Falls, Ontario, Canada
- Campus: 99 acres (40 ha)
- Colours: Blue & Gold
- Website: niagaraparks.com/niagara-parks-school-of-horticulture/

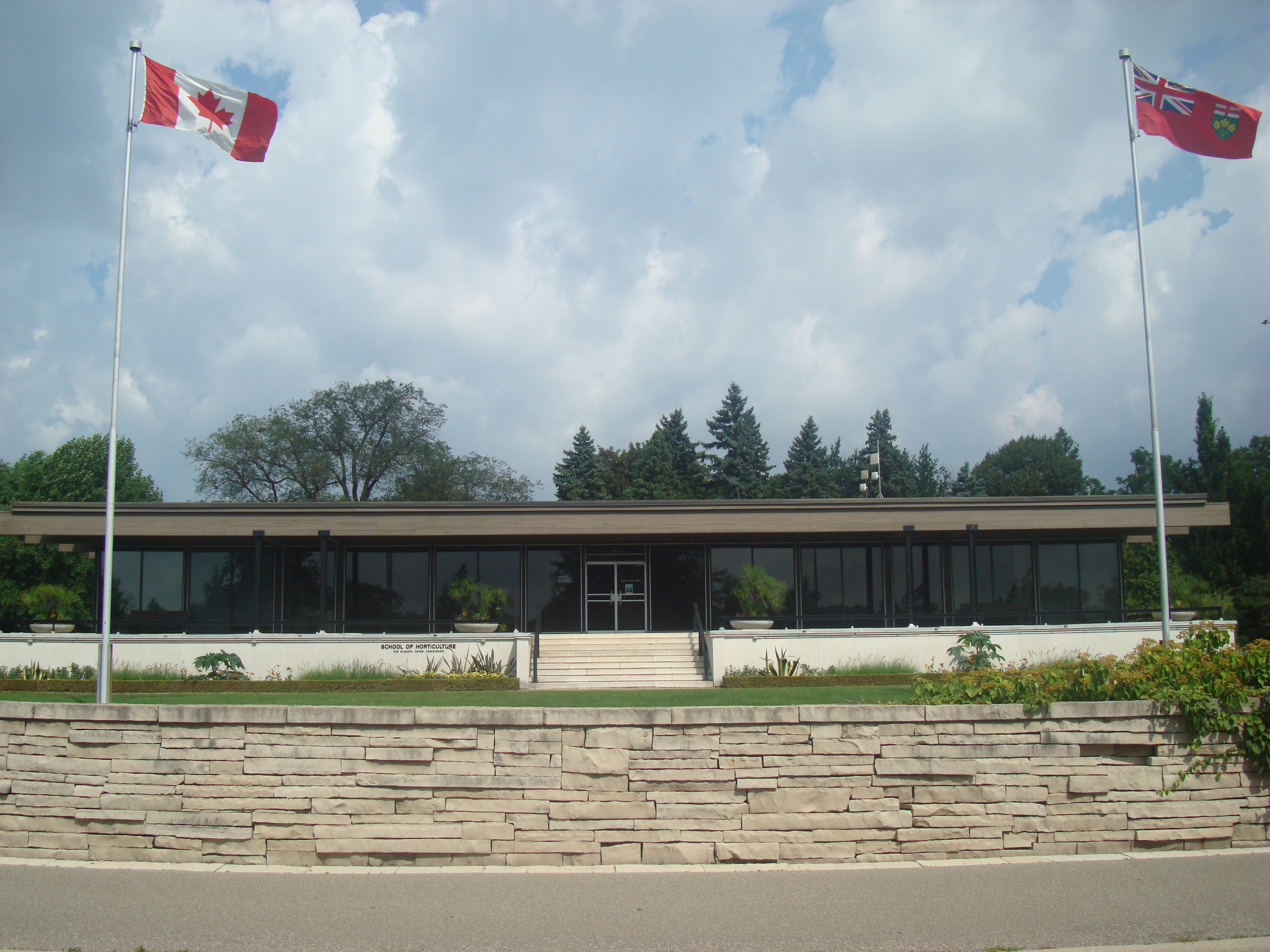
The Lecture Hall as seen in 2010.

The Niagara Parks School of Horticulture is an educational institution located on the grounds of the Niagara Parks Botanical Gardens. The school bills itself as an alternative to post-secondary schooling for horticulture by providing students with a 3 year program (36 consecutive months) combining practical and academic studies. The School of Horticulture is part of the Niagara Parks Commission which is located along the Niagara Parkway in Niagara Falls, Ontario.

== History ==
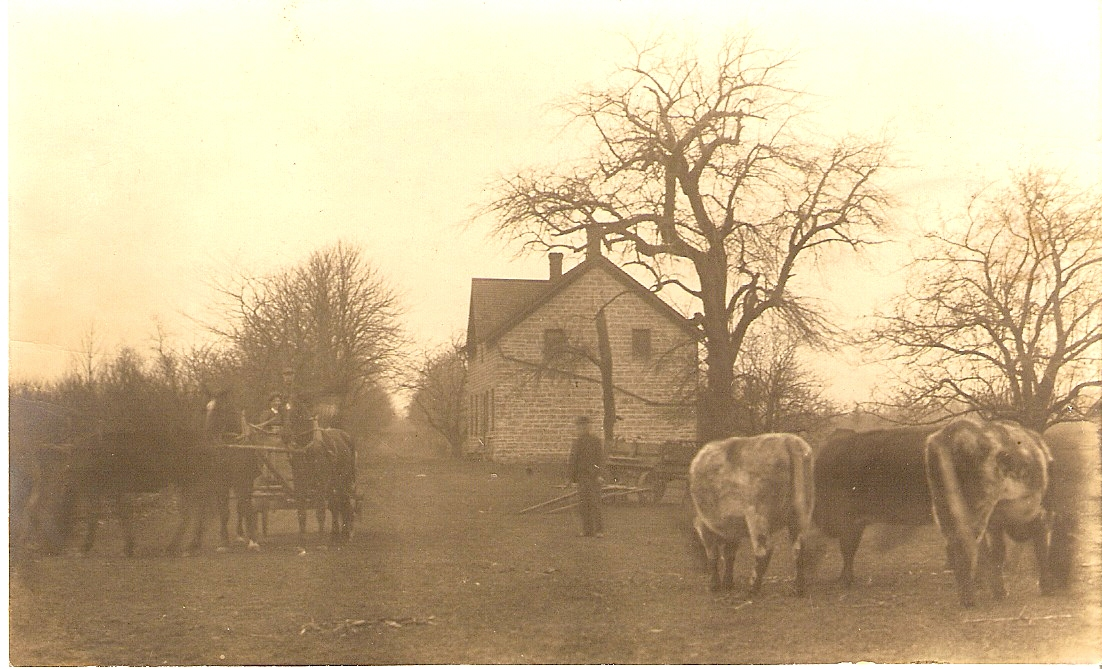
This photo is of the Murray Farmhouse in Niagara Falls, Ontario before it became the residence for the School of Horticulture.

Before the school was founded, the land was part of a large Oak Savannah, which means it was made up predominantly of grassland and Oak trees. In the late 1700's it became farmland. The East wing of the now residence building "The Bothy" is the original farmhouse still used today as dorm rooms and the residence kitchen. While it has undergone strenuous renovations, it is still called the Murray Farmhouse after the last family that lived in the building. The Murray family owned the property from the 1870’s before the final Murray brother passed in 1916. The land was then bought by the Hydroelectric Power Commission to build a hydro canal to draw water from Niagara Falls to the Queenston-Chippawa Hydro plant, currently known as the Sir Adam Beck Generating Station. The canal began construction in 1917 and remains located behind the property, bringing water to the power station. The HEPC then sold the 320 acres of land to the Niagara Parks in 1919 for $100,000. The school was founded in 1936 as the Niagara Parks Commission Training School for Apprentice Gardeners and was renamed with the current name in 1959. In the beginning, all students were required to be male and single. It wasn't until 1976 that the first female, Deborah Pollock, graduated from the program.

== Admissions and Programs ==
Admissions to the school require applicants with prior horticulture experience plus an Ontario Secondary School Diploma (or equivalent). The school is looking for students of all ages. As of 2024, the school accepts an average of fifteen students per year. Two academic semesters run on a ten-week rotation, starting Labour Day. Followed by a practical-based summer semester. This program is year-round. When students aren't in academic classes, they can be found outside, maintaining the grounds of the 99-acre Botanical Gardens.

The final semester of the third year is a 10-week (minimum) internship. Students find placements all over the world.

Graduates receive a diploma in Professional Horticulture upon completion of required courses and practical application over 3 years.

The Niagara Parks School of Horticulture offers an apprenticeship program that meets the requirements to become a Red Seal Horticulture Technician. The program offers a standard of 6120 hours of work and school experience throughout the 3 years. After receiving their diploma, graduates have the opportunity to complete the certification exam to qualify for a Red Seal certification in Landscape Horticulture.

== Campus ==
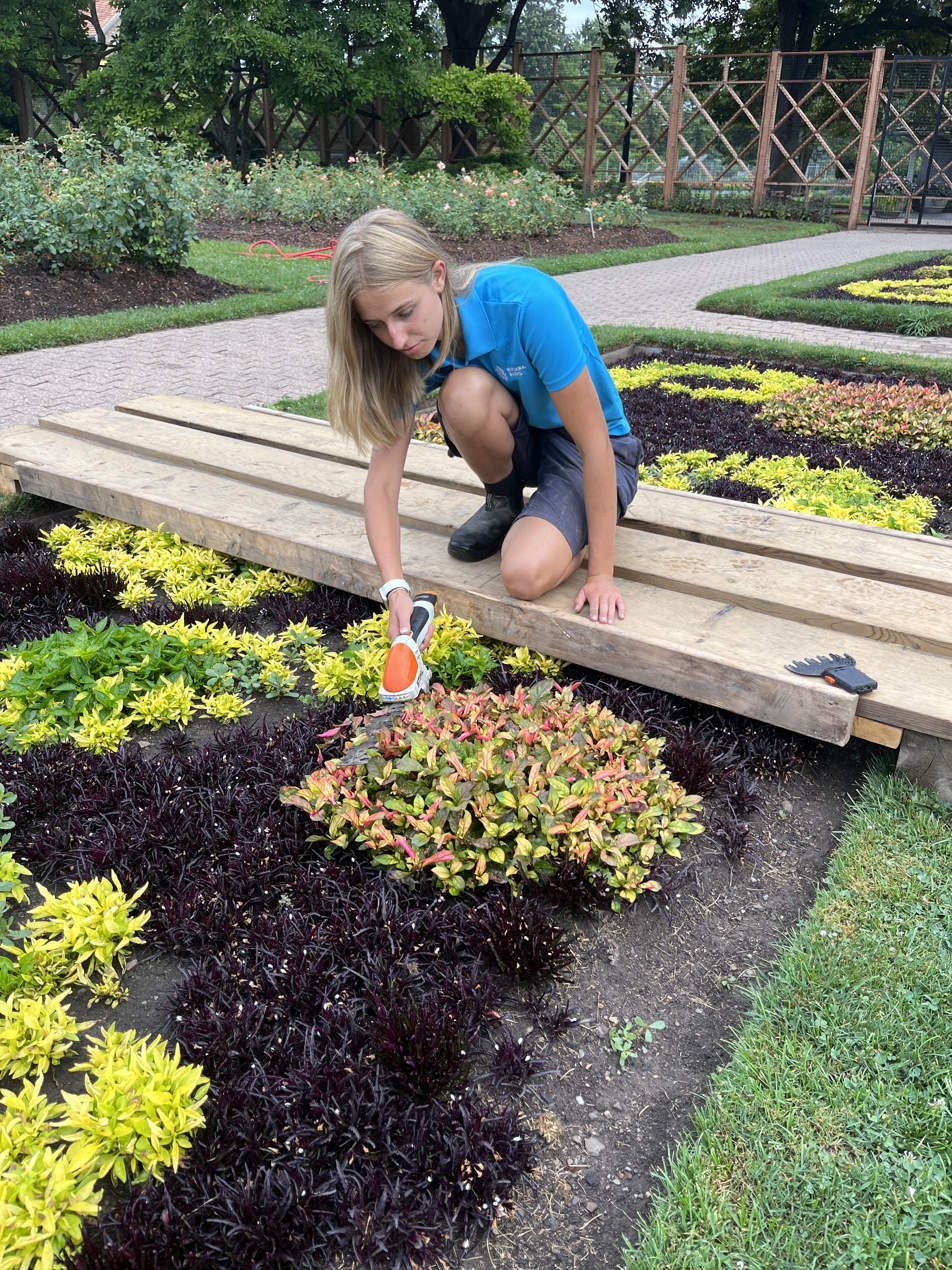
School of Horticulture student trimming the carpet bedding in the Rose Garden.

Training for students is conducted at the Niagara Parks Botanical Gardens, Butterfly Conservatory and The Niagara Parks Greenhouses. All students have the opportunity to live in the residence, located on the botanical gardens grounds.

The School of Horticulture students are responsible for maintaining the Niagara Botanical Gardens on a year-round basis. Regular garden maintenance continues into the fall semester of the academic season, and winter tree pruning, greenhouse work, and more are completed through the winter semester of the academic season.

== Notable Graduates ==
- Alfred H. Savage - horticulturist in the 1950s and 1960s, he later became a transit manager with the Toronto Transit Commission and the Chicago Transit Authority
