= Niagara Parks Butterfly Conservatory =

Butterfly house in Niagara Falls, Ontario, Canada

Coordinates: 43°8′14.39″N 79°3′19.85″W

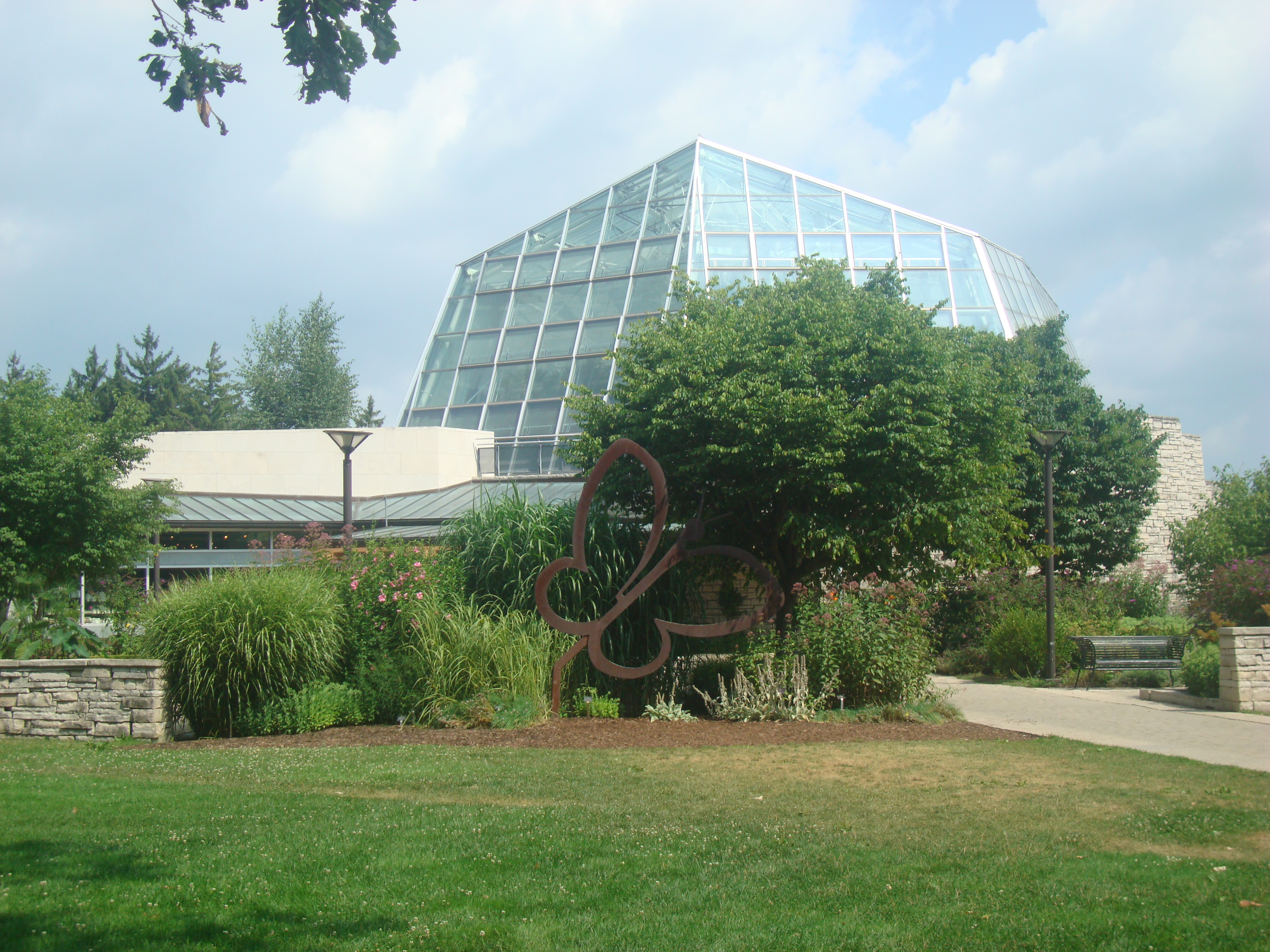
- Interactive map of Niagara Parks Butterfly Conservatory
- Date opened: 1996
- Location: Niagara Falls, Ontario, Canada
- Floor space: 1,022 square metres (11,000 sq ft)
- No. of species: 60
- Owner: Niagara Parks Commission
- Website: Official website

The Niagara Parks Butterfly Conservatory is a butterfly house operated by the Niagara Parks Commission in Niagara Falls, Ontario, Canada. It is located approximately 9 kilometres (5.6 mi) north of Niagara Falls on the grounds of the Niagara Parks School of Horticulture, which is 40 hectares (99 acres) in size.

The conservatory was opened in December 1996 with a gift shop, 200-seat theater/auditorium room, and a climate-controlled greenhouse. The conservatory has over 2,000 tropical butterflies from over 45 different species. The conservatory glass dome is 1,022 square metres (11,000 sq ft) in size with 180 metres (590 ft) of paths inside the greenhouse portion, which has a wide variety of foliage. The conservatory can accommodate up to 300 visitors per hour. Since captive butterflies usually have a life span of 2–4 weeks, the conservatory imports up to 3,000 butterflies per month from world butterfly farms in Costa Rica, El Salvador, the Philippines, and Australia. Special netting along the inside of the glass dome keeps the butterflies from getting stuck to it and from dying from hypothermia. Butterfly food plants at the conservatory such as Lantana, Cuphea, Zinnia, Ixora, Liatris, and Pentas are replaced every 2–3 weeks because caterpillars have large appetites.

Visitors who want the butterflies to land on them should wear bright clothes, move slowly, and wear perfume or cologne. The Emergence area allows visitors to view the butterfly life cycle and produces over 45,000 butterflies annually.

The species of butterfly at the conservatory include the banded orange, blue morpho, common Mormon, cydno longwing, Doris longwing, Gulf fritillary, Julia, Low's swallowtail, monarch, mosaic, owl, red lacewing, Sara longwing, and small postman.

== Gallery ==
Butterflies at Niagara Parks Butterfly Conservatory

Malachite butterfly

Butterflies eating oranges
