= Sherman Zavitz =

Canadian historian

Sherman Zavitz is a Canadian historian and retired teacher.

== City of Niagara Falls Official Historian ==
He was the Official Historian of the City of Niagara Falls, Ontario, until his retirement in 2019. He wrote widely about local Niagara history, conducted walking tours at places of historical significance and made extensive radio broadcasts.

Drawing on his historical knowledge, Zavitz has also served as a tour guide to visitors to Niagara Falls.

== Publications ==
Zavitz's publications include:

Niagara: then and now, (1996)

Niagara at the turn of the century and how it has changed (1996)

It happened at Niagara (1996)

It Seemed As If 100 Men Were Pounding My Head (Grey Borders Books, 2015)

== See also ==
- Niagara Falls § History
