= Foxhead =

Foxhead may refer to:

- "Foxhead", an episode of The Outsider (miniseries)
- Sheraton on the Falls, Niagara Falls, Canada, once known as the Sheraton-Foxhead
