= Casino Tower =

Structure in Niagara Falls, Ontario, Canada

Coordinates: 43.091768°N 79.072295°W

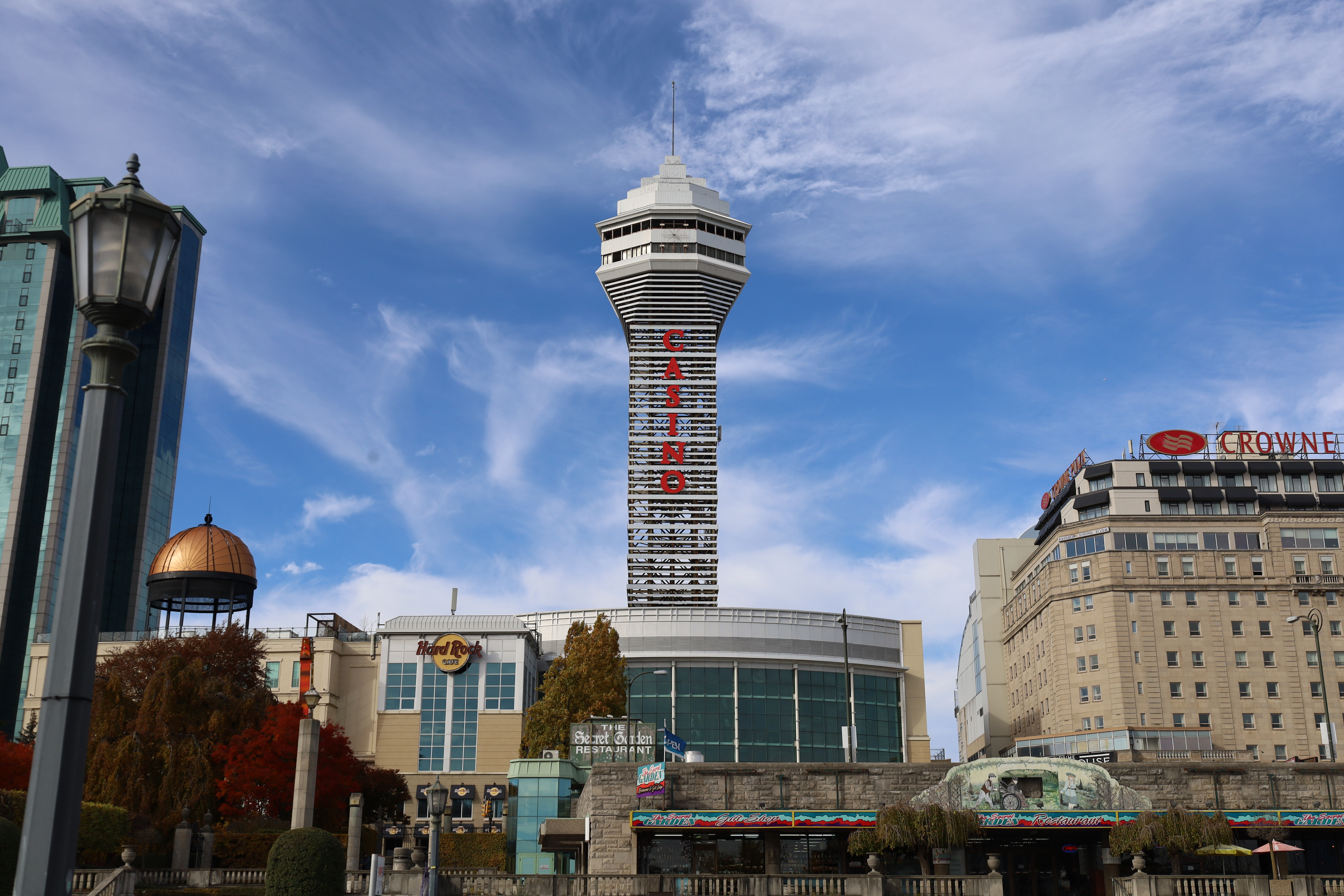
- The Casino Tower in 2023
- Interactive map of the Casino Tower area
- Former names: Oneida Tower, Kodak Tower

General information
- Status: Standing but no public access
- Location: 5705 Falls Avenue; Niagara Falls, Ontario; L2E 6T3
- Completed: June 1964

Height
- Height: 108 m (355 ft)

Technical details
- Structural system: Open Steel Truss

Design and construction
- Architect: Alan R. Moody

The Casino Tower, formerly known as the Oneida Tower and Kodak Tower, is a 355-feet-tall open steel tower in Niagara Falls, Ontario, Canada. Designed by the architect Alan R. Moody, it was built in a matter of six months by Frankel Steel Company of Toronto in the busy tourist season of 1964.

In 1974, the Oneida Tower became known as the Niagara Tower and Plaza Limited. In 1985, this tower became the centre piece of the Maple Leaf Village Shopping Complex under the name of "Kodak Tower".

The tower received a new look to reflect its more upscale surroundings, although there is no public access. It is now simply known as the "Casino Tower", and is being used as a large sign for the casino.

== Oneida ==
The Oneida Community was established in 1848 at Oneida, New York by John Humphrey Noyes. This was perhaps the first communal community established in North America. In 1877, a segment of this community began making and selling iron spoons in order to make a living. In 1880, this Oneida Community broke apart. A segment of the Oneida's continued to manufacture spoons. This segment of this community under the leadership of John Noyes and his ancestors established the Oneida Silversmith Factory in Niagara Falls in 1926. They owned a large tract of land along the north side of Clifton Hill where they built a manufacturing business including offices and a factory.

=== Tower Development ===
In 1963, the Oneida Community Developments Company (Canada) Limited decided to further develop its Niagara Falls property by building a tower and commercial stores in a complex facing Falls Avenue. Under the direction of then company president, Pierrepont T. Noyes, an observation tower measuring 104 metres (341 feet) tall was built. The top of the flag mast was 108 metres (355 feet) above Falls Avenue.

This tower and commercial complex was designed by architect Alan R. Moody and it was constructed in six months by the Frankel Steel Company of Toronto. This tower was built of an open steel frame construction and was the first of its construction type ever built in Canada.

A building crane with a two hundred and ninety foot long boom was used to build this steel and glass structure. The base of this tower was created utilizing 350 tons of steel embedded into four concrete - sixteen foot square cubes of concrete. Each block weighed 300 tons, each of which was anchored into the bedrock.

Construction progressed at a rate of six feet per day. The top of this tower was capped with a two-storey observation deck capable of holding 1,500 people at a time. The tower was completed in June 1964. Price of admission to the observation deck was $1 per adult and 25¢ per child. Two glass-enclosed elevators at the center of this tower were capable of carrying 1,800 people per hour. The fifty second long elevator ride would take passengers 278 feet to the lower observation level. From this lower deck, people could walk up to the top observation deck located ten feet above. The upper deck was a partially open, providing people with excellent views of the Falls through special openings in the wire mesh fencing and to provide for the taking of pictures.

In case of emergencies, both elevators which were built side by side had side entrances. In the case that one elevator became stuck, the other could be maneuvered beside the stranded elevator and the passengers transferred from the stricken elevator and safely returned to the ground level. A 500-step stairway for emergency use only was also available.

In addition to the tower, a five store - two storey commercial plaza was built at the base. The cost of this project was 10 million dollars of which the tower cost one million dollars. At night this tower was illuminated in a manner so that just the observation decks were lighted giving the appearance that it was hanging in mid-air.

A giant 50 ft by 30 ft neon company sign adorned the top of the tower. In 1974, the sign was removed because rust had rendered it unsafe.

== Kodak Tower ==
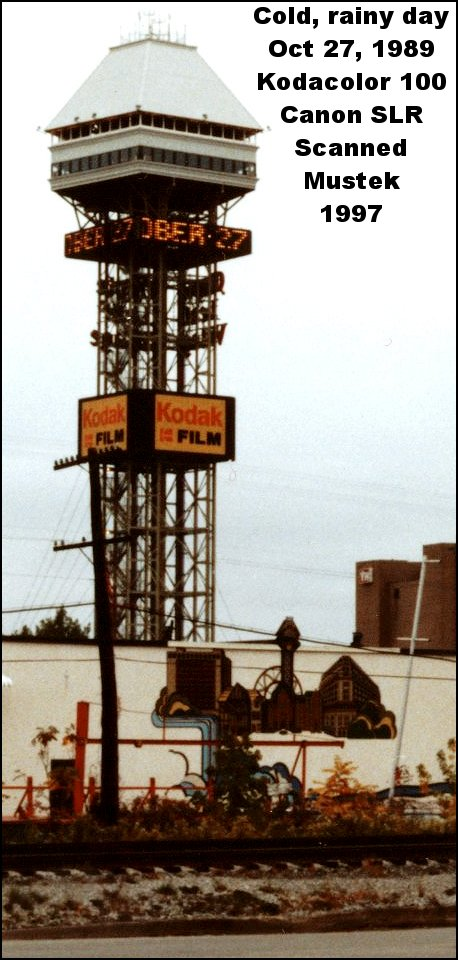
Kodak Tower, 1989

In 1974, Oneida relocated their offices and York Hannover Developments and Worst holdings invested $26 million in the creation of an amusement park concept after the site was cleared. Its initial annual payroll was $3 million. The park pre-dated by two years the opening of Canada's Wonderland, presumed at that point to cost $105 million when completed.

The three-story complex of Maple Leaf Village was constructed around the tower. It boasted a multi-screen movie theatre, numerous attractions (through the years: That's Incredible! museum and the Elvis Presley Museum were here), countless souvenir and apparel stores, Lillie Langtry's tavern and club and, in later years, the first locale for the Canadian comedy cabaret, Yuk-Yuk's. On the north side of the property was a carnival midway, complete with "North America's Largest" Ferris wheel which, along with the tower (now called the Kodak Tower) dominating the northern tourist skyline.

As part of the Clifton Hill tourist area, the facility was well received and attracted crowds for years. Eventually, however, the novelty began to wear thin as shops folded and main tenants relocated to other locations with more suitable infrastructure.

Admission costs to the Kodak Tower were eliminated for a few years, until unsafe conditions closed the tower altogether in the early 1990s. At the end of the 1992 season, the amusement park closed down. In early spring of 1993 the Ferris wheel was dismantled and shipped to Asia for use there.

By January 1994, only a dozen shops remained in operation throughout the sprawling three-story structure. Redevelopment of the property was necessary, as many more shops were preferring on-street access in the burgeoning tourist area. The Maple Leaf Village Mall closed for the last time on February 1, 1995.

== Casino Niagara ==
Casino Niagara, which is a privately-owned casino, opened in the building on December 9, 1996; it is still in operation today with a sports bar.

The site was intended to be a temporary site, but the new site was filled by the Niagara Fallsview Casino Resort. The site remained open as a permanent installation and the tower was given white panelling to reflect its more upscale surroundings and large red capital letters spelling out C-A-S-I-N-O were placed vertically on the side of the tower, which are lit up at night. However, there is no public access as it is deemed unsafe. The tower today is considered an eyesore by locals and is in poor condition. Deterioration is visible under the outer panelling to the steel trusses, as they have turned from white to brown from rust. There are no plans to reopen the tower to the public.

== See also ==
- Casino Niagara
- Maple Leaf Village
- Niagara Falls
- List of tallest buildings in Canada
- List of tallest buildings in Niagara Falls, Ontario
