= Conklin Shows =

North American traveling amusement corporation

Conklin & Garrett Ltd.
- Type: Privately held company
- Industry: Amusement - Midway
- Founded: 1916
- Headquarters: Brantford, Ontario
- Key people: Jim Conklin (son of founder); Frank Conklin (grandson of founder)
- Products: Amusement ride rental/operation and traveling carnival management
- Divisions: World's Finest Shows, Conklin Supershows, Carnival Group
- Website: Conklin Shows; Conklins Super Shows; World's Finest Shows

Conklin Shows was a traveling amusement corporation, and the largest in North America. The 75-year-old company operated traveling carnivals at various summer agricultural shows across North America and is based in Brantford, Ontario, and formerly also in West Palm Beach, Florida. The company has a long history in Canada, providing entertainment for generations of children and adults. The organization used to operate the midway services for some of Canada's largest summer fairs including the Canadian National Exhibition in Toronto, the Calgary Stampede, and Edmonton's K-Days. In 2004, Conklin Shows International route and equipment were sold to North American Midway Entertainment.

Two of the remaining companies, World's Finest Shows and Conklin Super Shows, still are part of the Conklin Group of Carnival Companies. World's Finest Shows' route includes more than 60 fairs, all in Ontario, Canada. They are both based in Ontario, Canada.

Conklin Shows, as it was known in Canada and the US, now operates under North American Midway Entertainment (NAME). The carnival provides the midway at fairs and exhibitions, including, Miami, Florida's Miami-Dade County Fair, Edmonton, Alberta's K-Days Calgary, Alberta's Calgary Stampede and Toronto, Ontario's CNE, The Canadian National Exhibition.

== History ==
Conklin Shows was founded by James Wesley "Patty" Conklin, who was born Joseph Renker in 1892 in Brooklyn, New York, and died in 1970. He was brought up by foster parents. By 1906 he had begun selling peanuts without a permit at Madison Square Gardens whenever a circus was in town, and newspapers on the streets of New York, before becoming a sideshow host at Coney Island. When he was 21, his father dropped dead and Patty inherited CA$3,300 (equivalent to $90,867 in 2025). By 1915, he was running his own gambling games at various midways across the southern United States. After meeting James Wesley Conklin (1861–1920) around 1916, he adopted his surname, Conklin, as his own.

In 1916, Patty and J. W. Conklin established Clark & Conklin Shows. Lasting four seasons playing at various shows around the mid west, the company folded after the death of the father. In 1921, Patty moved full-time to Canada. He moved the show north to play at the Winnipeg Exhibition. Due to a problem with the fair, their participation was canceled. While returning to the United States with a train car full of prize merchandise, Patty stumbled upon a show just outside Winnipeg. They joined up with the operator of the fair, International Amusement Company and worked all of the remaining Canadian shows that year.

=== War years ===
After working the road hosting small fairs coast to coast for 20 years, Conklin Shows bid on and won the midway contract for the 1937 Toronto Canadian National Exhibition. The fair, one of the largest in the world, was a prized show. By 1941, the company played at 98% of all the major fairs across Canada. To accommodate travel to the various shows, they ran a 45-car specialized train cars. Specialized boxcars painted bright orange 80 ft (24 m)long were fitted with custom doors to accommodate speedy loading and unloading of gear. The train carried 15 feature attractions and 21 rides and 700 people including performers and crews. Patty Conklin himself traveled in style with his CA$6,000 (equivalent to $115,906 in 2025) Mexican stylized 5-room 'mansion on wheels' private car.

Having the CNE contract helped turn it into a profitable company in the early 1950s Conklin Shows borrowed over half a million dollars and began to build permanent attractions on the CNE fairgrounds of Exhibition Place. In 1953 they constructed the Mighty Flyer, a wooden rollercoaster, that lasted until the early 1990s.

The early 1970s saw the company begin to diversify, including establishing Maple Leaf Village (now Casino Niagara) in Niagara Falls, Ontario, along with running a venue at the base of the CN Tower in Toronto.

In 1975, Conklin Shows' biggest rival, Royal American Shows, declined to return to fair dates in Canada due to later disproved charges of tax evasion, charges that several Canadian carnivals aided and encouraged. The next year, Conklin was awarded the contracts previously held by RAS – including the Calgary Stampede and Vancouver Pacific Exhibition, largely due to Conklin being a Canadian business. The 1980s and 1990s were a time of growth for Conklin as it operated across the prairies with stops in Winnipeg, Edmonton, Calgary, Regina and Saskatoon. It also opened up a number of smaller fairs as well as provided a schedule and route for many smaller independent shows such as Lauther Amusements and Billy Truax Amusements. These companies, although bound by contracts to the larger Conklin Shows, operated as separate shows.

Conklin also became known for its very large and quite unique collection of rides, many of which were large, European built rides rarely seen in North America, and some never even traveled north of the border. One of the most of famous attractions in Conklin's line up was the "Doppel Looping", North America's first and only traveling double loop roller coaster which was imported in from Germany in the mid 80s. This mammoth coaster, which took 28 trailers to move, only made the trip as far north as Toronto, and even this was not financially feasible after the late 90s. The coaster was eventually sold off in 2008. Some of the other Conklin rides that were one of a kind in an American traveling carnival included the "Drop of Fear" and the "G-Force".

As time progressed, Conklin began to show signs of financial strain that was synonymous with the entire traveling carnival industry. Favorites such as the Zipper and the Octopus, as well as The Kamikaze and The Rainbow were phased out and sold as cost-cutting measures. Independents that had long traveled as a part of Conklin Shows were also phased out. Finally other rides such as the Drop of Fear, G-Force, Enterprise, Gravitron, Starship 2000, Flying Bobs, Aladin, Break Dance, Crazy Flip, Hi-Roller, Rotor, Devastator, Swiss Bob, Hully Gully, Tip Top, Flic Flac, Tango, Evolution, Spin Out, 1001 Nacht, Chaos, Inverter, Flipper, Touchdown, Cobra, Scorpion, Double Sky Wheels, Paratrooper, Hurricane and the Mark 1 & Wildcat roller coaster were sold to competing companies or shelved in West Palm Beach, Florida.

In 2004, Conklin Shows was purchased for US$100 million. It was merged with the former Farrow Shows from Jackson, Mississippi, Thebault-Blomsness (Astro Amusements and All Star Amusements), and former president and CEO of Ticketmaster Group, Frederic Rosen, to form the newly minted North American Midway Entertainment Co. or N.A.M.E. This became official in Columbia, South Carolina in 2004. In January 2006, N.A.M.E. also acquired Mid America Shows, and several contracts and rides from Cumberland Valley Shows.

N.A.M.E. provides rides at over 145 fairs and events yearly. Now included are Cinco de Mayo in New Orleans as well as the Dade Co. Fair, Illinois State Fair, Kentucky State Fair, Indiana State Fair, and Big E Eastern States Exposition. New and more expensive rides have been added to its line-up but at the cost of many of the old favorites. Frank Conklin, while owning part of N.A.M.E., has left the management of the combined company to others.

In 1984, Jim Conklin donated many antique midway rides from his collection to Calgary's Heritage Park historical village. These restored rides now make up the majority of the rides at Heritage Park's Conklin Lakeview Amusement Park.

== Current operations ==
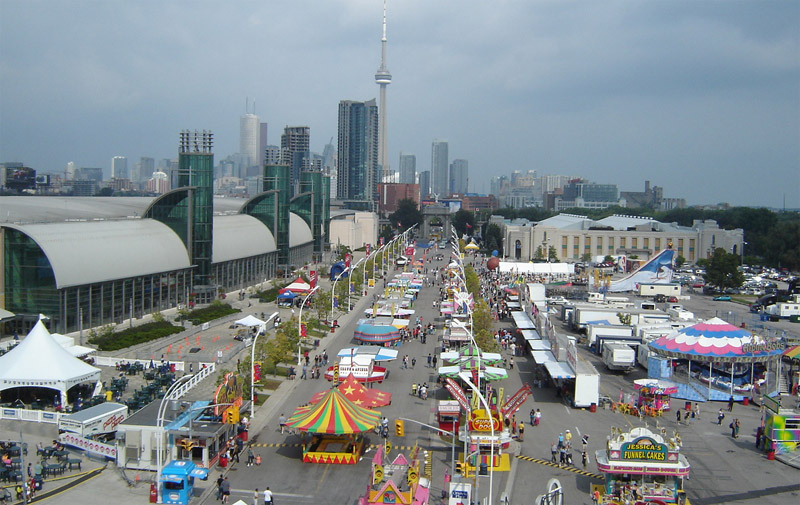
The Conklin Midway at Toronto's Canadian National Exhibition

Conklin Group is made up of two operating units: World's Finest Shows and Conklin Supershows.

This is a list of some of the venues they provided midway services for in the past:

- Edmonton: K-Days
- Toronto: Canadian National Exhibition
- Ottawa: Ottawa SuperEX
- Regina: Buffalo Days, Queen City Ex
- Vancouver: Pacific National Exhibition
- West Palm Beach: South Florida Fair
- Miami: Miami-Dade County Fair
- Calgary: Calgary Stampede

=== Conklin Supershows ===
Conklin Supershows is one of Conklin Shows' smaller sub-companies. It currently owns 13 game trailers, and 17 rides.

==== Current games ====
- Duck Pond
- Basketball
- Cork Guns
- Skee-Ball
- Chicken Ring Toss
- Punk Rack
- Water Racer

==== Current rides ====
- Chilly Willys
- Carousel
- Safari Carousel
- 911-Fire Brigade
- Super Tilt-A-Whirl
- Heavy Haulers
- The Great Western Train
- Fire Trucks
- fun house
- Dragon castle glass house

==== Former rides ====
- Sea Dragon
- Dragon Castle Maze
- Super Scooter (Bumper cars)
- Emergency 911
- Victory Lap Slide
- Super Space Sled
- Super Silver Streak
- Super Bumper Cars
- Jolly Roger
- The Round Up
- The Hard Rock and Roll
- The Himalaya
- The Super Loop
- The Gravitron
- Gee Whiz
- The Rainbow
- The Zipper
- The Holiday Bounce
- Toboggan
- the Love Bug

=== Conko Inc ===
Conko Inc still continues various operations today, among them is a traveling show train, permanent show train and carousel in Chinguacousy Park, various games and rides, and ice cream waffle stands at Canadian National Exhibition.

=== World's Finest Shows ===
One of Conklin Shows' more successful sub-companies is the World's Finest Shows, which travels throughout Ontario, Canada. The company owns more than 40 rides and concessions.

== See also ==
- Maple Leaf Village – A now defunct small amusement park in Niagara Falls Ontario.
- Canadian National Exhibition – former client (now operated by North American Midway Entertainment
- Exhibition Place – Toronto, site of one of the world's largest fairs
- Lake Ontario Park- Kingston, Ontario – rides removed after 2005
