= Sheraton Fallsview Hotel =

Canadian resort hotel

Sheraton Fallsview
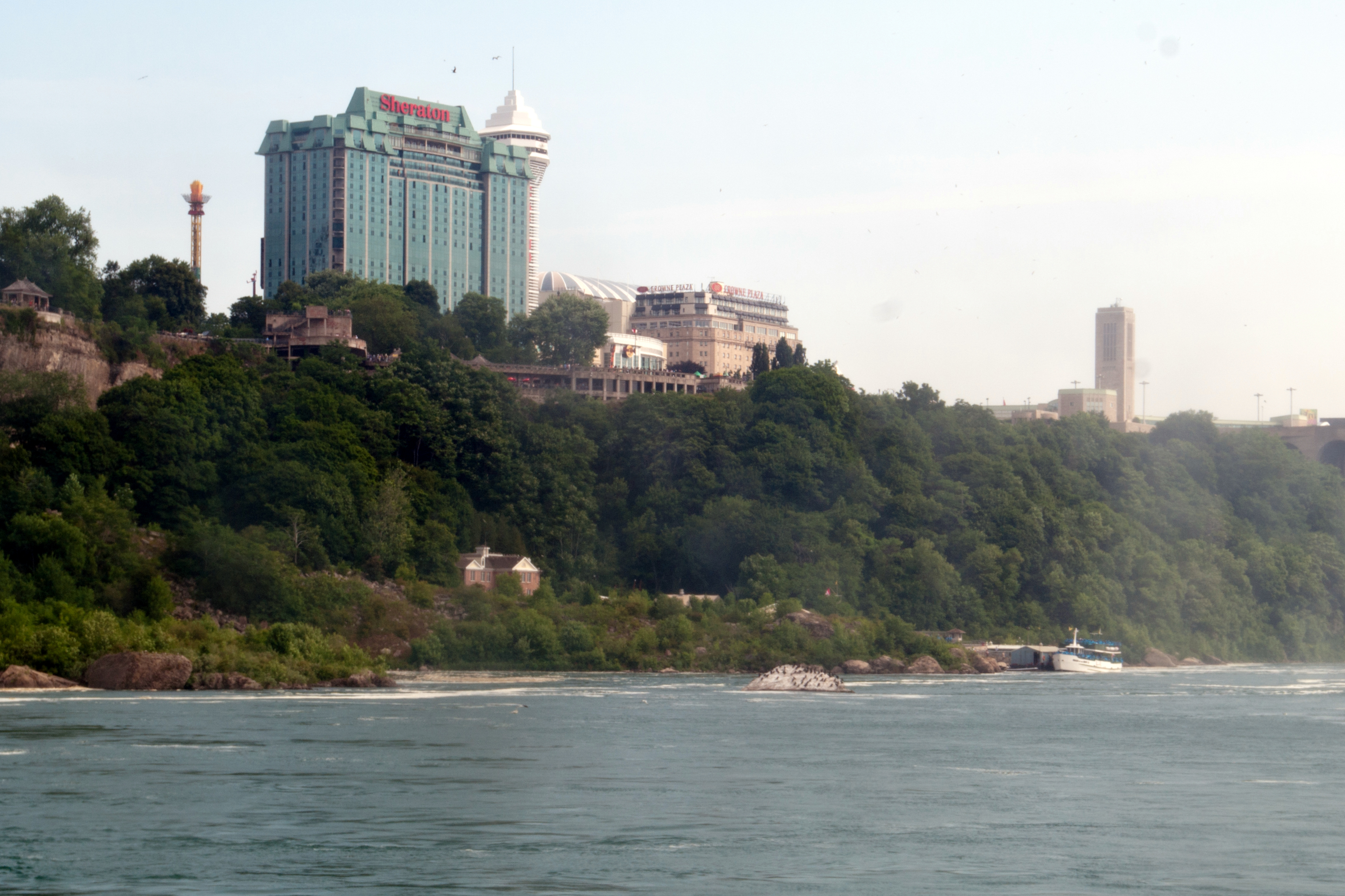
- Sheraton Fallsview, 2012

- Location within Ontario

General information
- Location: 5875 Falls Avenue; Niagara Falls, Ontario; L2G 3K7
- Coordinates: 43.0907°N 79.0725°W
- Opening: 1926 (original), 1966 (current building), 2000 (reconstruction)
- Management: Canadian Niagara Hotels

Technical details
- Floor count: 22

Other information
- Number of rooms: 669
- Number of restaurants: 4

Website
- Official Site

The Sheraton Fallsview is a 22-story hotel located within Falls Avenue Resort in Niagara Falls, Ontario, Canada.

== Location ==
The Sheraton Fallsview is situated directly across from Niagara Falls in the heart of the tourist district. The Sheraton is the cornerstone of Falls Avenue Resort which includes an indoor walkway from the hotel to attractions and dining options on complex that include the Fallsview Indoor Waterpark, Hershey Store, Rainforest Cafe, Hard Rock Cafe, Adventure City, Crowne Plaza Niagara Falls-Fallsview and Skyline Inn.

== History ==
=== The location ===
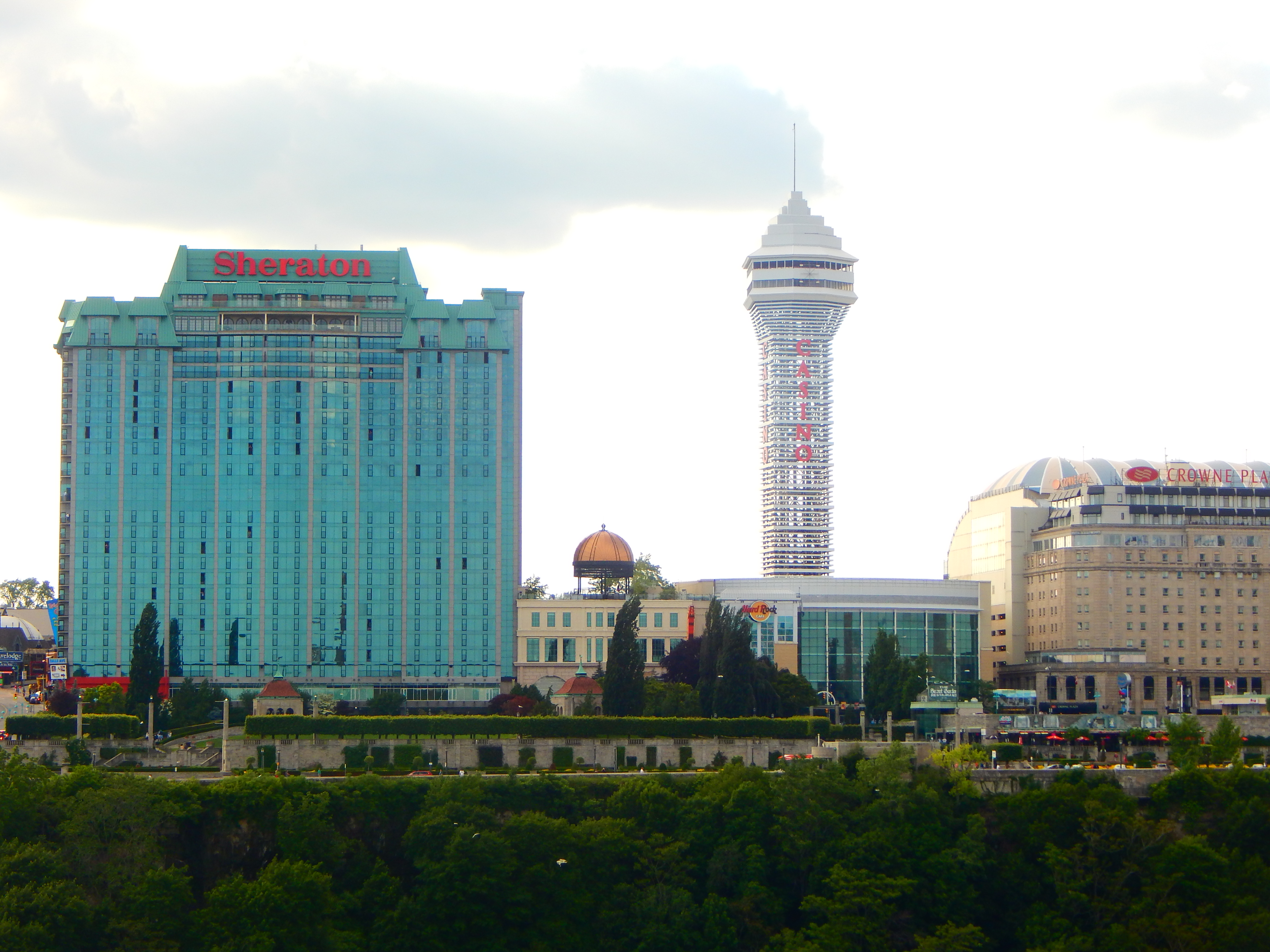
Sheraton Fallsview, 2015

The Sheraton site has housed guests visiting Niagara Falls for more than 100 years. The first hotel at this location on Clifton Hill, the Parkside Inn, was built in the early 1890s. It was a three-story building, with an observatory. Amenities included hot & cold running water, electricity, and gas. In later years, the Parkside Inn was enlarged, by incorporating two adjacent buildings into the original structure. From 1914 to 1921, the Parkside Inn was used as a wing of the adjacent Clifton Hotel (which later burned down, in 1932). In 1923, Howard Fox purchased the Parkside Inn and changed its name to the Clifton Inn, later shortened to The Inn. It became the Fox Head Hotel in 1926, after being remodeled into a fake old English inn. In 1951, Sheraton Hotels bought the property, by that point named the Foxhead Hotel. The original hotel closed in 1958 and reopened the following year, after the western end was converted into Tussaud's Waxworks, which still stands.

=== Current structure ===
The rest of the original building was demolished in 1964, and the brand new Sheraton-Foxhead Motor Inn was constructed on the site, opening in 1966. The Sheraton-Foxhead was among three hotels located within the Maple Leaf Village Amusement park along with sister hotels the Brock-Sheraton, and Sheraton Motor Inn (Skyline Inn). After the amusement park's demise, the 14-storey hotel building was entirely gutted and had eight stories added on top, reemerging in 2000 as the 22-storey Sheraton on the Falls Hotel. The hotel was renovated again in 2021 and renamed Sheraton Fallsview. Confusingly, this is the name by which the nearby, unrelated Marriott on the Falls Hotel was known from 1993-2011.

== Amenities ==
The Sheraton Fallsview has direct indoor connections to attractions, restaurants, and hotels on the 20-acre (81,000 m^{2}) complex including the Fallsview Indoor Waterpark, Casino Niagara, Hershey Store, Rainforest Cafe, and Hard Rock Cafe, Niagara Dining.

== Facts and figures ==
- 669 guestrooms and suites
- Panoramic Fallsview Dining
- Indoor Connections to Falls Avenue dining and attractions
- Indoor Walkway to Casino Niagara/Fallsview Indoor Waterpark/Crowne Plaza Niagara Falls – Fallsview
- 200,000 sq ft (19,000 m^{2}) conference centre

== Live webcams ==
- Niagara Falls Webcam offering Live Streaming view of the Horseshoe Falls from the roof of the Sheraton on the Falls
- Rainbow Bridgecam features a live streaming view of the Rainbow Bridge-a direct connection between Niagara Falls, Ontario and Niagara Falls, New York

== See also ==
- Fallsview Indoor Waterpark
- Casino Niagara
- Niagara Fallsview Casino Resort
- WWE Niagara Falls
- Crowne Plaza Niagara Falls – Fallsview Hotel
