= List of tallest buildings in Niagara Falls, Ontario =

Skyline of Niagara Falls
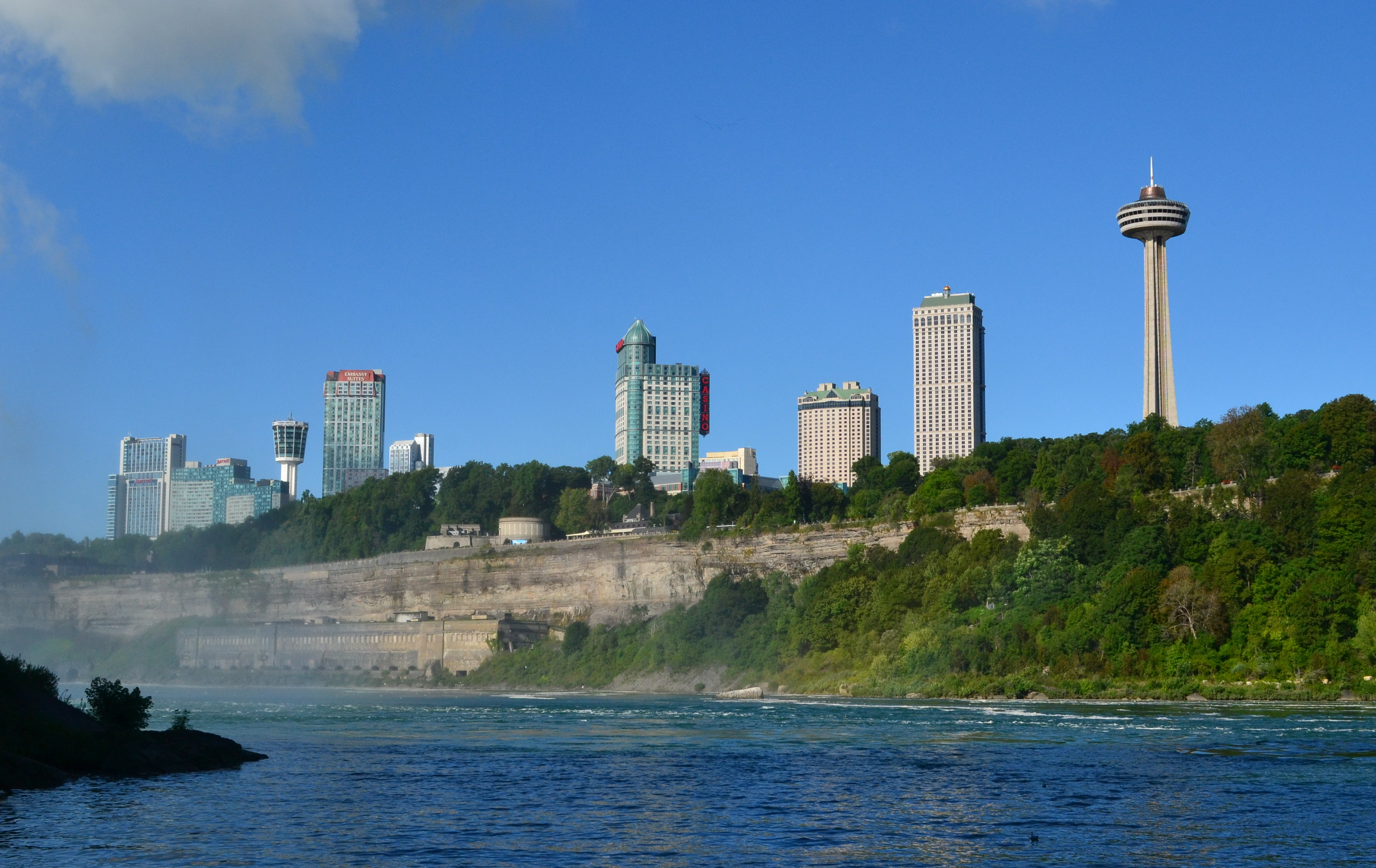
- Niagara Falls viewed from the Niagara River in 2015
- Tallest building: Hilton Niagara Falls Tower 2 (2009)
- Tallest building height: 177 m (531 ft)

Number of tall buildings
- Taller than 50 m (164 ft): 11
- Taller than 75 m (246 ft): 7
- Taller than 100 m (328 ft): 5
- Taller than 150 m (492 ft): 1

Niagara Falls, Ontario, is the principal tourist city in the Niagara Region of Ontario. Niagara Falls has 5 buildings that stand taller than 100 m (328 ft). The tallest building in the city is the 51-storey, 177 m (581 ft) Hilton Niagara Falls Tower 2, which was completed in 2009. Owing to its status as major tourist city for its unobstructed view of both the Horseshoe Falls and American Falls, most of Niagara Falls' tallest buildings are hotels.

As of June 2025, the city contains 7 skyscrapers over 75 m (246 ft) and 15 high-rise buildings that exceed 35 m (115 ft) in height. The Hilton Niagara Falls remains the latest high-rise development in the city.

== Tallest buildings ==
This list ranks completed buildings in Niagara Falls that stand at least 50 m (164 ft) tall as of 2026, based on standard height measurement. This includes spires and architectural details but does not include antenna masts. Freestanding observation and/or telecommunication towers, while not habitable buildings, are included for comparison purposes; however, they are not ranked. One such tower is the Skylon Tower.

Was the tallest building in Niagara Falls upon completion

Rank	Name	Image	Location	Height m (ft)	Floors	Year	Purpose	Notes
1	Hilton Niagara Falls North Tower		43°04′59″N 79°05′00″W	177.1 (581)	53	2009	Hotel	Tallest building in Niagara Falls. The Skyscraper Center lists the building as having 58 floors, while Hilton lists the building as only having 53 floors.
N/A	Skylon Tower		43°05′07″N 79°04′47″W	158.5 (520)	N/A	1965	Observation	
2	Embassy Suites Hotel Niagara Falls		43°04′46″N 79°04′56″W	118 (387)	36	2003	Hotel	Tallest building in Niagara Falls from 2003 to 2009.
3	Niagara Fallsview Casino Resort		43°04′56″N 79°04′50″W	111 (364)	32	2004	Hotel	
N/A	Casino Tower		43°05′30″N 79°04′20″W	108.2 (355)	N/A	1964	Monument	Former observation tower. There is currently no public access.
4	Marriott Fallsview Hotel		43°04′39″N 79°04′58″W	107.9 (354)	31	2000	Hotel	The building was originally constructed in 1990. A 12 storey addition was completed in 2000. Tallest building in Niagara Falls from 2000 to 2004.
5	Hilton Niagara Falls South		43°04′57″N 79°04′59″W	103 (338)	30	1999	Hotel	Tallest building in Niagara Falls briefly from 1999 to 2000.
6	Tower Hotel		43°04′45″N 79°04′56″W	99 (325)	30	1962	Hotel	Tallest building in Niagara Falls from 1962 to 1999. Formerly known as the Konica Minolta Tower.
N/A	Sky Screamer		43°03′43″N 79°04′33″W	91.4 (300)	N/A	2004	Ride	
7	Sheraton on the Falls		43°05′27″N 79°04′22″W	83.2 (273)	22	1999	Hotel	
8	Oakes Hotel Overlooking The Falls		43°04′48″N 79°04′55″W	63.4 (208)	21	2003	Hotel	
9	Double Tree Resort Lodge and Spa		43°05′14″N 79°05′03″W	63.4 (208)	18	2004	Hotel	
10	Marriott Niagara Falls Fallsview Hotel & Spa		43°04′43″N 79°04′55″W	60 (200)	20	1998	Hotel	
11	Four Points by Sheraton		43°04′54″N 79°05′00″W	51 (167)	17	1985	Hotel	Formerly known as Renaissance Fallsview, Fallsview Plaza Hotel and Ramada Renaissance Hotel-Fallsview.
N/A	Rainbow Tower		43°05′31″N 79°04′12″W	50.3 (165)	N/A	1947	Bell tower	Bell tower overlooking Rainbow Bridge.

== See also ==
- List of tallest buildings in Canada
- List of tallest buildings in Ontario
- Canadian architecture
