= North American Midway Entertainment =

American provider of midway services

- Type: Subsidiary
- Industry: Amusement - Midway
- Founded: 2004
- Headquarters: Farmland, Indiana, US
- Area served: United States, Canada
- Key people: Danny Huston (President)
- Products: Amusement ride rental/operation and traveling carnival management
- Parent: North American Fairs, LLC
- Website: https://www.namidway.com/

North American Midway Entertainment, LLC (NAME) is an American provider of midway services based in Farmland, Indiana, that describes itself as "the world's largest traveling outdoor amusement park". NAME provides rides, games and food to over 15 million fairgoers every year in 20 states and 4 Canadian provinces. In 2018, NAME was recognized as the leading midway provider to the top 50 fairs of North America.

Currently, NAME provides midway services to over 130 events across the continent and also offers opportunities for special event amusement ride rentals.

The company represents a merger in 2004 of several midway companies, including part of Conklin Shows, the former Farrow Shows from Jackson, Mississippi, and Thebault-Blomsness (Astro Amusements and All Star Amusements). Later acquisitions were Mid America Shows and part of Cumberland Valley Shows.

North American Midway Entertainment was acquired by Townsquare Media of Greenwich, Connecticut, in August 2015. On May 24, 2018, Townsquare Media sold North American Midway Entertainment to North American Fairs, LLC for $23.5 million.

NAME operates an award-winning employee recognition program called the "Magnificent Employee" program.

In 2019, NAME partnered with Netflix to launch the third season of Stranger Things at the Calgary Stampede. The company transformed the Giant Wheel with a massive banner and decals featuring characters and monsters, one of five attractions that were altered to be Stranger Things themed for the duration of the Stampede. Other attractions included Spider Ride, Mardi Gras, the Euroslide and the Balloon Pop Game. However, it wasn’t just the rides that were transformed - fairgoers were also able to purchase drinks and popcorn that featured “Hawkins Fun Fair” branding.

NAME purchased a 150 foot tall (46 meters) traveling Ferris Wheel and premiered it in the South Carolina State Fair in 2019. The wheel is a RL50 Observation / Super Wheel and was manufactured in Europe by Ronald Bussink of Professional Rides AG and travels on 20 tractor trailer loads. This particular Ferris Wheel features 36 climate controlled gondolas that seat 4 to 6 guests per gondola.

== Clients ==
- The Big E
- Boone County Fair
- Calgary Stampede
- Canadian National Exhibition
- City Museum
- Dane County Fair
- Frontier Days Festival
- Howard County Fair
- Illinois State Fair
- Indiana State Fair
- Jackson County Fair
- K-Days
- Kentucky State Fair
- Miami-Dade County Fair
- Mississippi State Fair
- Red River Exhibition
- Regina Queen City Ex
- Rotary GroveFest
- Saskatoon Saskatoon EX
- South Carolina State Fair
- St. Joseph County Fair
- Tulsa State Fair
