= Hilton Niagara Falls Tower 2 =

Skyscraper-style hotel in Niagara Falls, Ontario, Canada

Hilton Niagara Falls/Fallsview Hotel and Suites
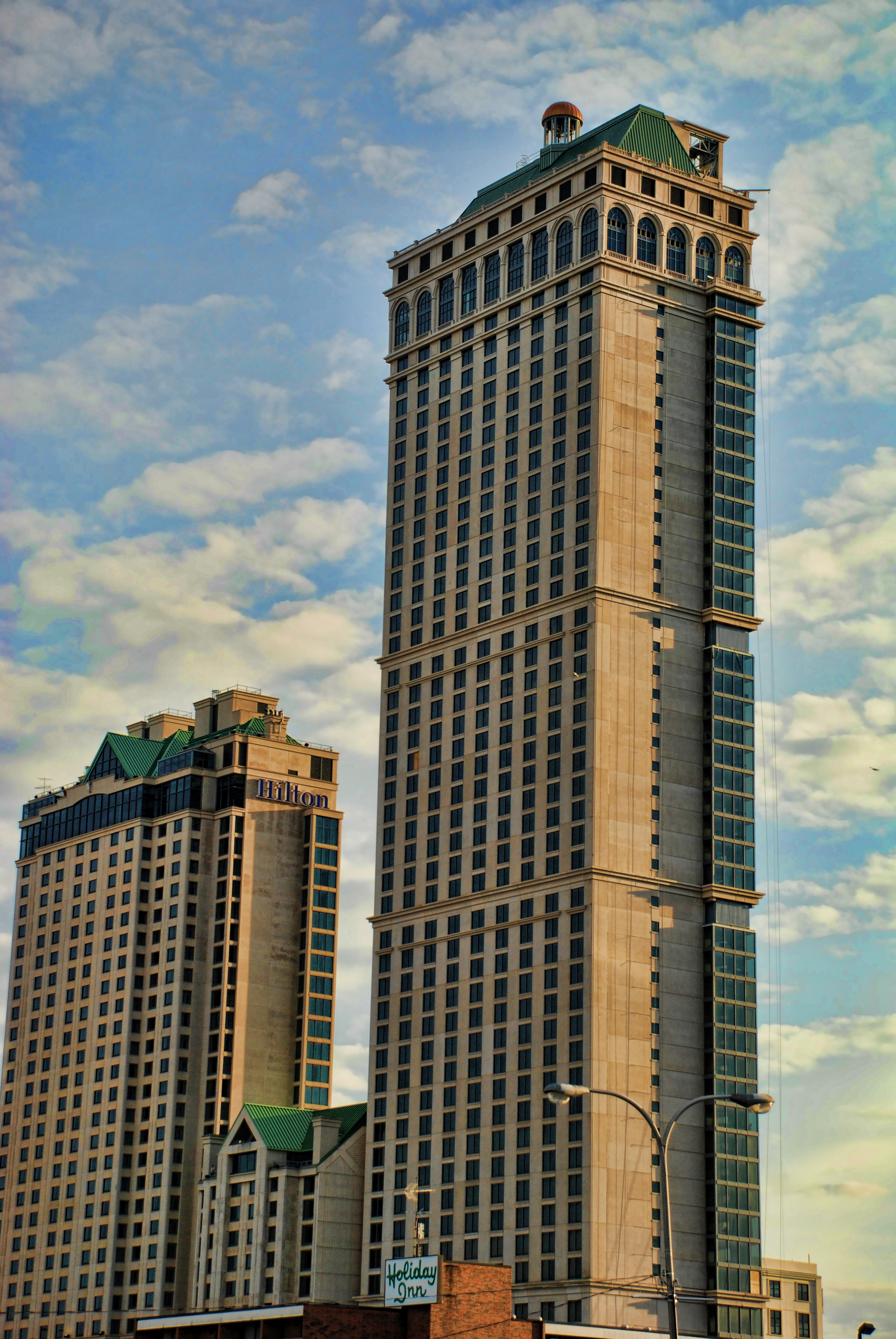
- Tower 1 (left) and Tower 2 (right) of the Hilton Niagara Falls

General information
- Location: 6361 Fallsview Boulevard; Niagara Falls, Ontario; L2G 3V9
- Coordinates: 43°04′57″N 79°04′58″W
- Opening: 2001
- Operator: Hilton Hotels & Resorts

Height
- Height: 163m to front street level, 177m to back

Technical details
- Floor count: 53

Design and construction
- Architect: Stanford Downey Architects Inc.
- Structural engineer: Quinn Dressel Associates

Other information
- Number of rooms: 1100
- Number of suites: 1100
- Number of restaurants: 6
- Parking: on-site

Website
- Official Site

Hilton Niagara Falls/Fallsview Hotel and Suites' North Tower is a skyscraper-style hotel in Niagara Falls, Ontario, Canada. It was originally slated to rise 58 floors to a height of 177 metres (581 ft), but the building was subsequently reduced to 53 floors as verified by the hotel operator themselves and the new height has never been publicly released. It has, however, clearly surpassed the Embassy Suites as tallest building in Niagara Falls and still has more than 500 rooms. It is also the tallest hotel in Canada.

The CTBUH lists the building as being 581 feet tall and still having 58 floors. Frommer's has stated the floor count at 59. Skyscraperpage lists the building as being 162 m (531 ft) tall with 53 floors. A visual floor count of the building yields only a total of 49 or 50 stories. The actual height is easily verified using Google Earth's measurement tools, and is 162 m (531 ft).

== Gallery ==
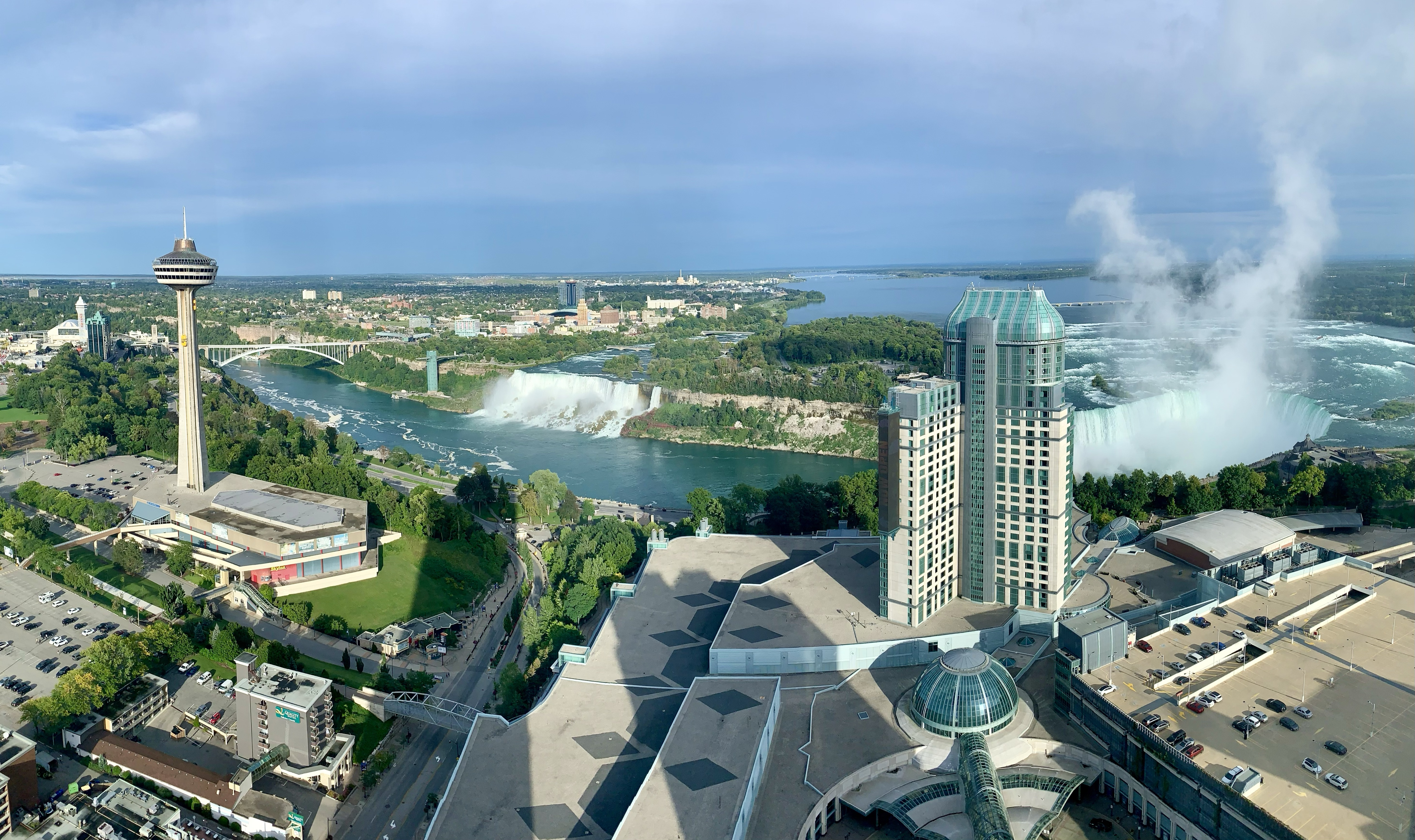
The American Falls (left) and Horseshoe Falls (right) as viewed from the Hilton Niagara Falls Tower 2's 44th floor. The Skylon Tower (left) and Niagara Fallsview Casino Resort (right) are in the foreground.

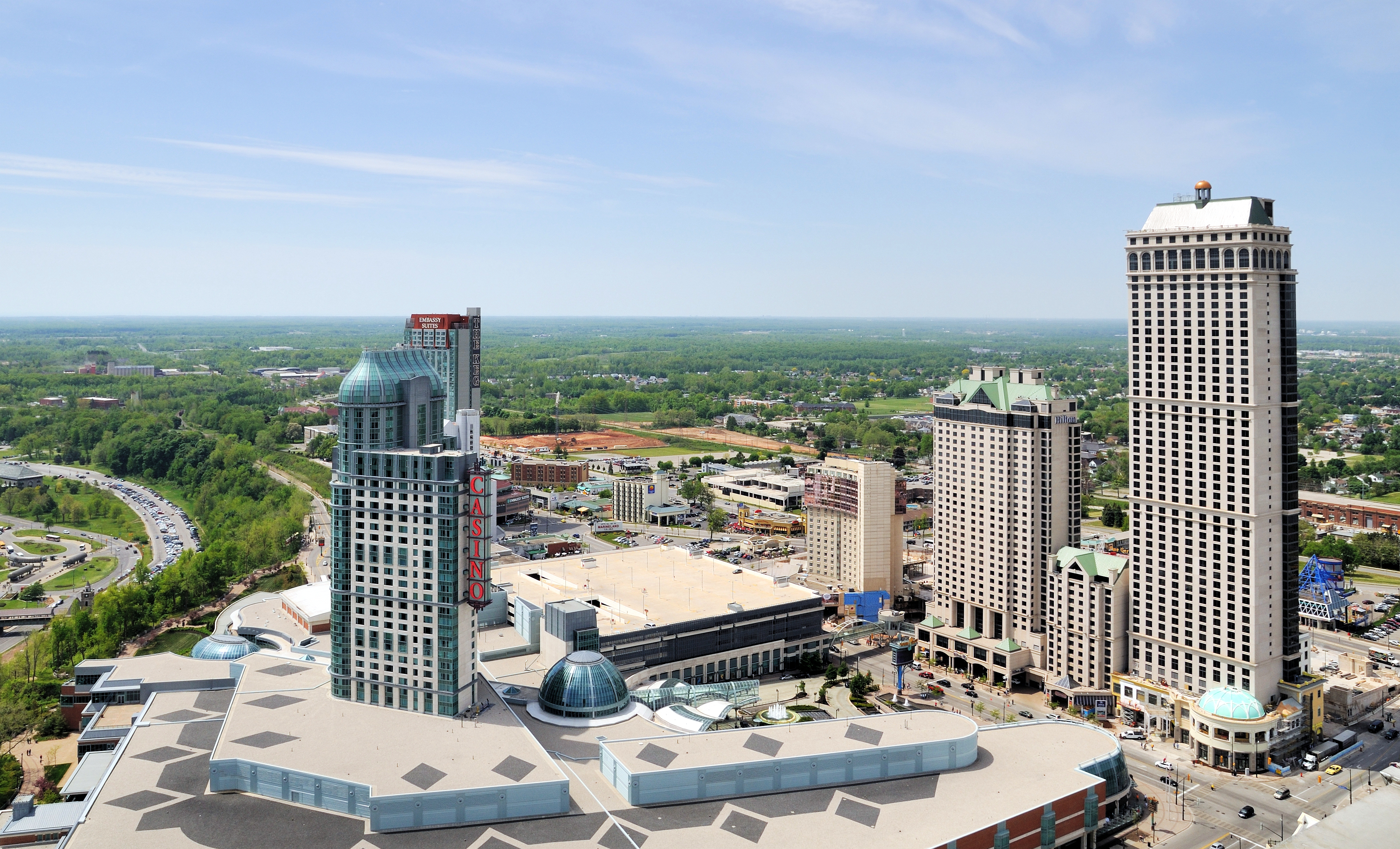
Hilton Niagara Falls (right) and Niagara Fallsview Casino Resort (left)

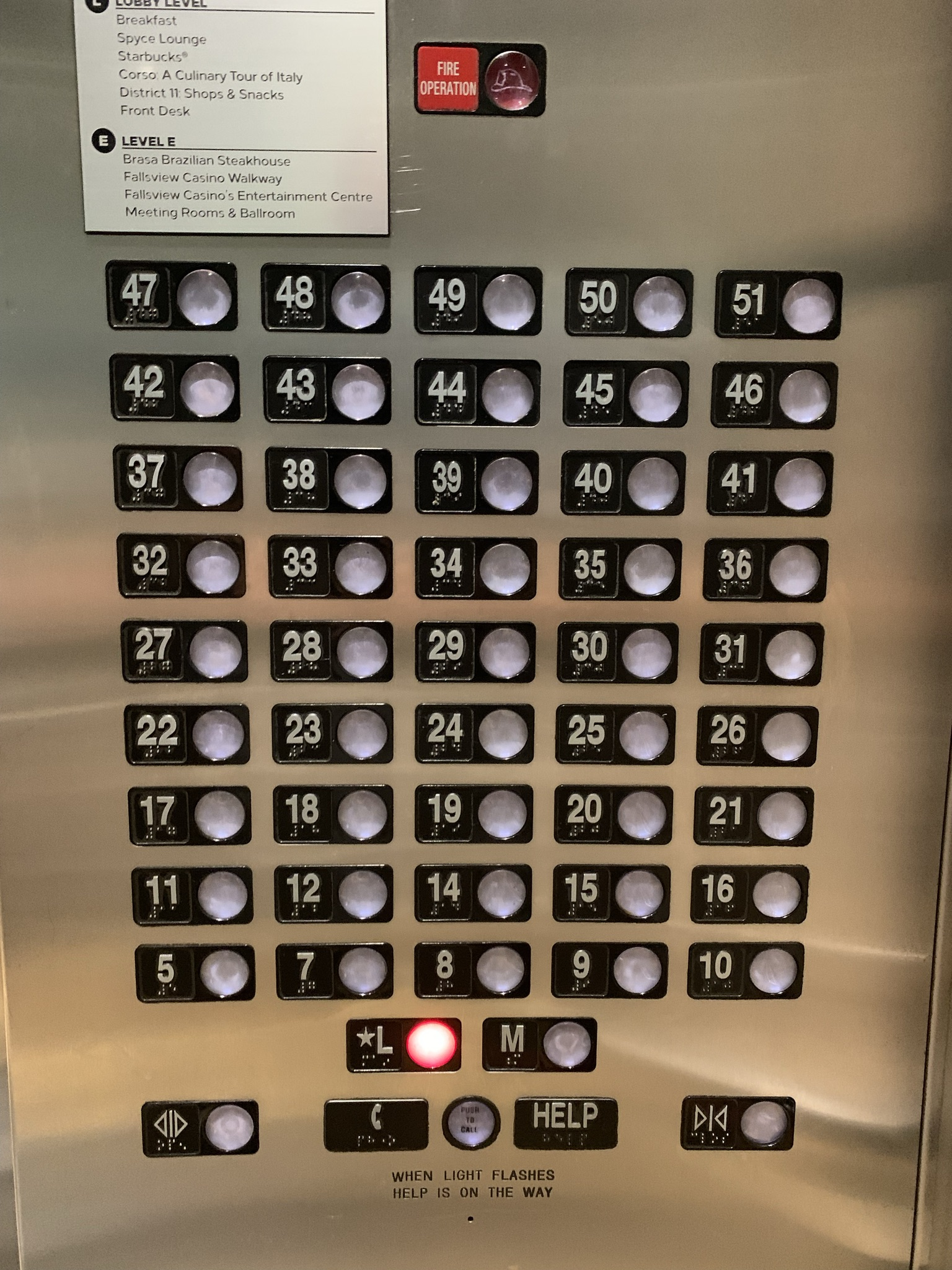
Elevator buttons in Tower 2

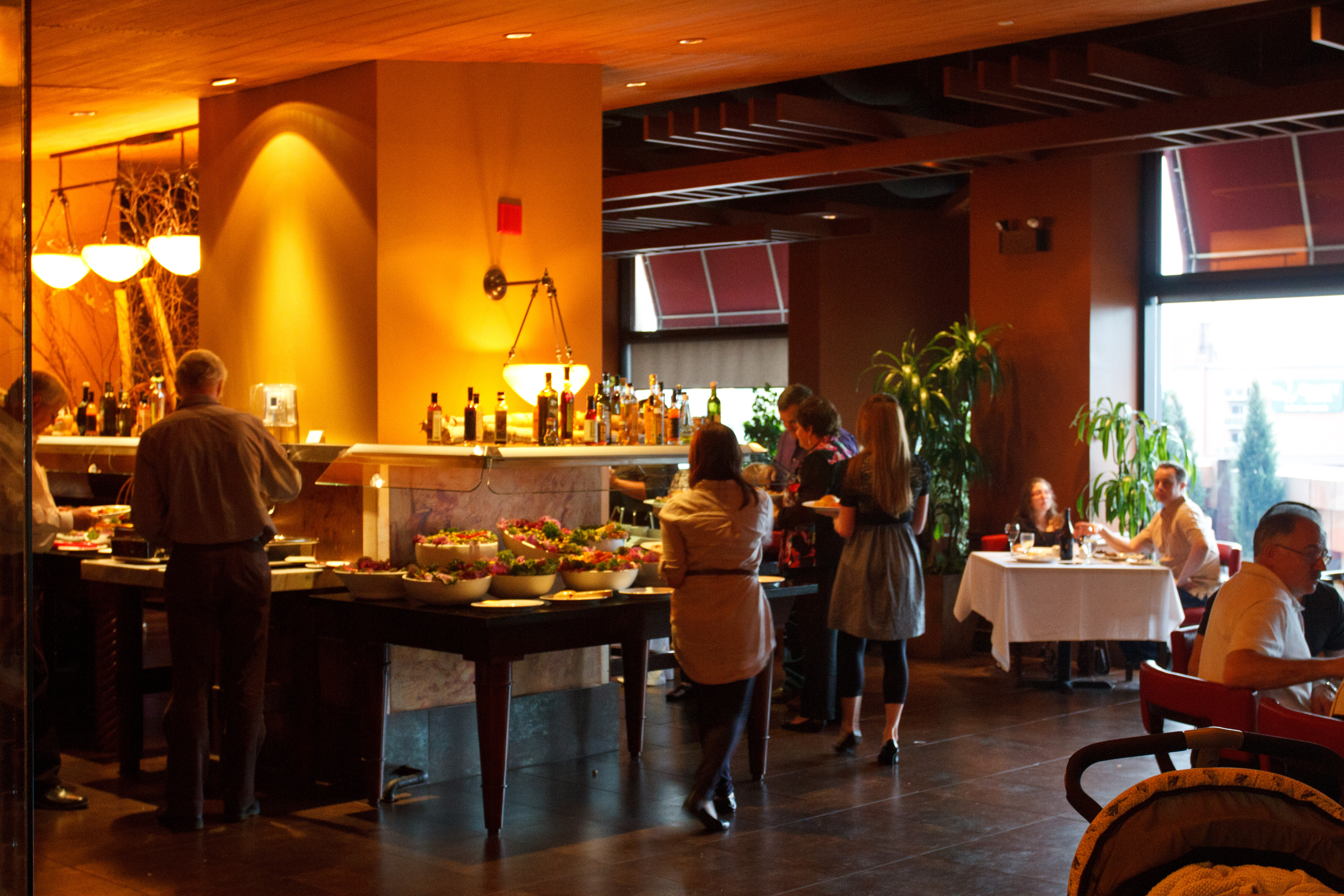
Buffet at the hotel restaurant Brasa

== See also ==
- List of tallest buildings in Niagara Falls, Ontario
