= The Brock Hotel =

Hotel in Niagara Falls, Ontario, Canada

The Brock Niagara Falls - Fallsview
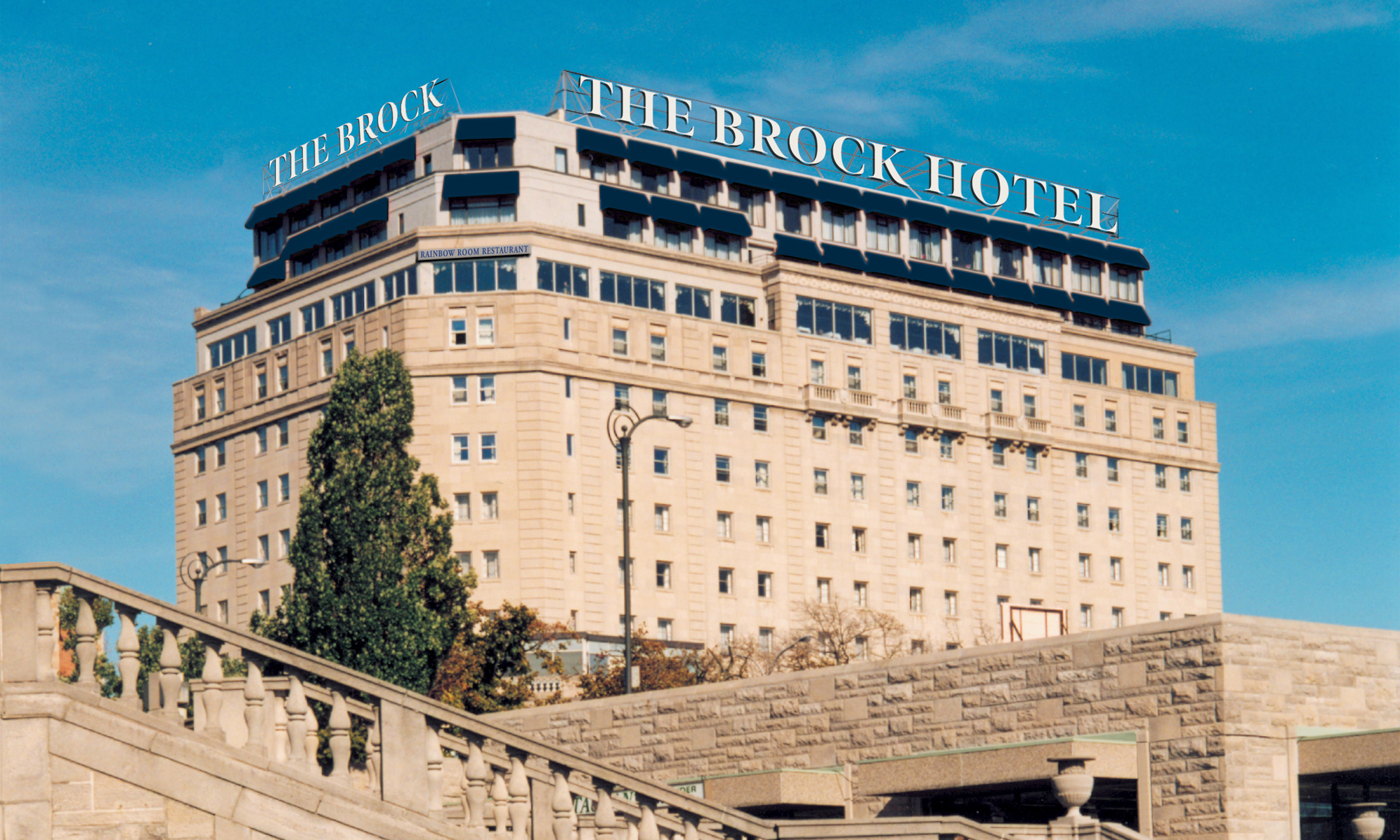
- Former names: Brock Plaza; Skyline Brock; Brock-Sheraton Hotel; Hotel General Brock; Crowne Plaza

General information
- Location: 5685 Falls Avenue; Niagara Falls, Ontario; L2E 6W7
- Coordinates: 43.0920°N 79.0715°W
- Opening: July 1, 1929
- Operator: Canadian Niagara Hotels Inc.

Technical details
- Floor count: 12

Design and construction
- Architect: Pigott Company

Other information
- Number of rooms: 234
- Number of restaurants: 4
- Parking: on-site

Website
- Official Site

The Brock Niagara Falls - Fallsview is a historic hotel located in the 20-acre (81,000 m^{2}) Falls Avenue Entertainment Complex in Niagara Falls, Ontario, Canada.

== History ==
The Hotel General Brock opened on July 1, 1929. It was named for Major-General Sir Isaac Brock, who died in the War of 1812, while defending Canada from the invading Americans at the nearby Battle of Queenston Heights. The 260-room General Brock was designed by architects Findlay and Foulis and constructed at a cost of $1.5 million by The Pigott Company of Hamilton, Ontario.

Two floors were added to the top of the hotel in 1948. In 1950, the Cardy Hotels chain, which owned the General Brock, was bought by Sheraton Hotels, and the hotel was renamed the Sheraton-Brock Hotel. In 1959, a new $500,000 convention wing was added, including the hotel's Crystal Ballroom. The hotel's name was changed slightly in 1982 to The Brock Sheraton, and again in 1985 to The Sheraton Brock. In 1989, the hotel left Sheraton and was renamed the Skyline Brock; it was again renamed the Brock Plaza Hotel in 2001. The hotel joined the InterContinental Hotels chain on April 17, 2008 and was renamed the Crowne Plaza Niagara Falls - Fallsview. On April 1, 2025, following a $15 million renovation, the hotel was renamed The Brock Niagara Falls-Fallsview, Tapestry Collection by Hilton, after joining Hilton Worldwide.

== In popular culture ==
In 1952, the 20th Century-Fox film Niagara was shot in Niagara Falls. Marilyn Monroe, Joseph Cotten, and Jean Peters all stayed at the Brock.

In 2000, the final scene of the film The Whole Nine Yards was shot on one of the balconies of The Brock Hotel.

== See also ==
Interconnected with the hotel are:

- Fallsview Indoor Waterpark
- Casino Niagara
