= South Carolina State Fair =

State fair held in Columbia, South Carolina

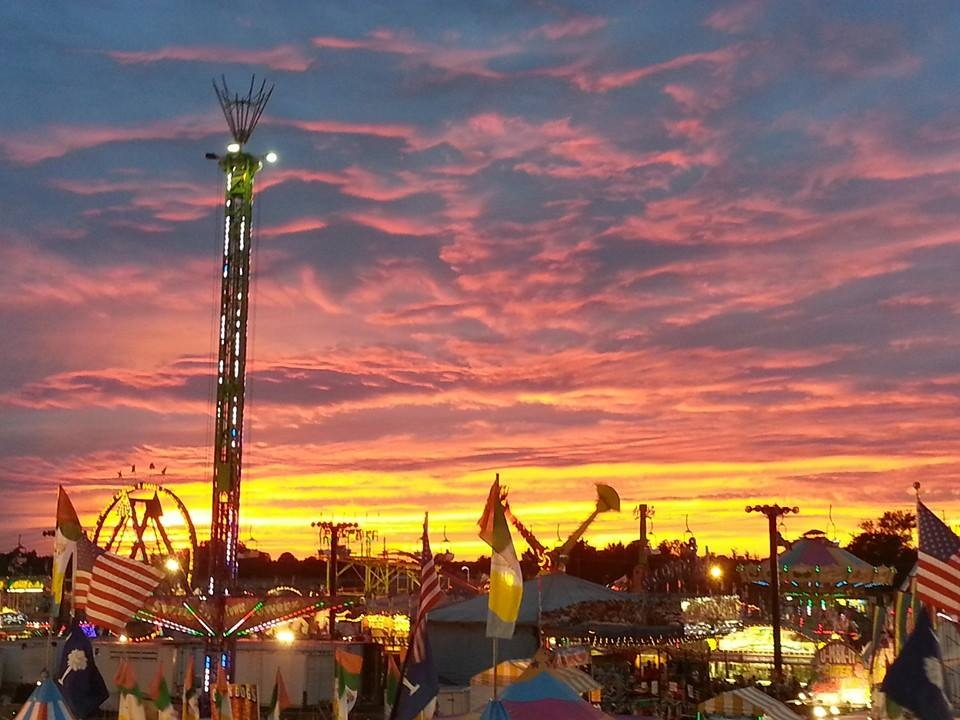
South Carolina State Fair at night, October 2014

The South Carolina State Fair is an annual 12-day state fair held in Columbia, South Carolina, and operated by the State Agricultural and Mechanical Society of South Carolina. North American Midway Entertainment caters rides, food, and games for the fair. The fair is South Carolina's largest recurring event, attracting over 400,000 fairgoers annually.

The South Carolina State Fair is a 501(c)3 non-profit organization and annually gives over a half-million dollars to South Carolina high school seniors continuing their education in South Carolina.

== History ==
The South Carolina State Fair was first held in 1869, and has been held every year since, with the exception of 1918 (due to the ongoing Spanish flu epidemic).

Bands and singers that have played in the Grandstand include Chicago in 1970, Golden Earring (from the Netherlands) in '74, Billy Ray Cyrus in 1995, Little Richard (from Macon) in '98, Jars of Clay in 2000, Beach Boys in 2001, Columbia's own Hootie & the Blowfish in 2001, Jesse McCartney in '05, Josh Turner (from Florence County) in '07, Daughtry (from Greensboro) in 2007, Jonas Brothers in 2007, Anthony Hamilton (from Charlotte) in 2008, Zac Brown Band (from Atlanta) with Sugarland in 2008, American Idol winner David Cook in '09, USC alumni Darius Rucker in 2010, Eric Church (from NC) in '10 with Miranda Lambert, Avett Brothers (from Charlotte) in 2010, Styx in 2011, Skillet in 2011, O.A.R. in 2012, Doobie Brothers in 2012, Boyz II Men in 2012, Hunter Hayes in '13, The Band Perry in '13, Needtobreathe (from Oconee County) in '13, British-American band Foreigner in '13, Corey Smith (from Georgia) in 2013, Lee Brice (from Sumter) in 2014, Marshall Tucker Band (from Spartanburg) in 2014, Charleston's Shovels & Rope in '14, MC Hammer in 2014, Gladys Knight (from Atlanta) in '15, Shawn Mendes (from Canada) in 2015, Aloe Blacc in '16, Lynyrd Skynyrd (from Jacksonville) in 2016, Alabama in '16, Chris Young (from the Nashville area) in 2017, Sabrina Carpenter in '17, Bret Michaels of Poison in 2018, The Temptations, Trace Adkins, Scotty McCreery (from Raleigh). Charleston's Jump, Little Children played there for the relocated 2019 Rosewood Crawfish Festival. The South Carolina State Fair ended its Grand Stand entertainment after 2018. Starting in 2019, in the place of the Grand Stand is a Circus Tent that offers three free circus shows each day of the fair. The South Carolina State Fair now features free nightly concerts at its Pepsi Place Stage showcasing local and regional artists.

Located on the South Carolina State Fairgrounds, at the north entrance, is the "Rocket". This "Rocket" is a Jupiter intermediate range ballistic missile, designed by Dr. Wernher von Braun and built by Chrysler. Its name is Columbia, and it was given to the city in the early 1960s by the U.S. Air Force. In 1969, the "Rocket" was erected at the South Carolina State Fairgrounds at a cost of $10,000. Through the years, the landmark has become a popular meeting place for guests, which has resulted in the popular phrase, "Meet me at the Rocket!"

Due to the COVID-19 pandemic the South Carolina State Fair scheduled for October 14–25, 2020 was replaced by a free drive-though only event held on October, 20–21. In 2021, the fair returned to the more traditional experience.
