= Maple Leaf Village =

Former entertainment complex

- Interactive map of Maple Leaf Village
- Location: Niagara Falls, Ontario, Canada
- Coordinates: 43.091668°N 79.072165°W
- Opened: May 1979
- Closed: 1992 (amusement park) 1995 (Maple Leaf Village Mall)

Maple Leaf Village is a former amusement park and entertainment complex in Niagara Falls, Ontario. Opened in May 1979, it was operated by Conklin Shows (operators of the midway at the Toronto Canadian National Exhibition). Falling on hard economic times in the early 1990s, it was restructured and replaced with Casino Niagara, a government-run casino.

== Early history ==
In the early 1900s, the land was host to Frontier Amusement Park, which boasted one of Canada's first all-steel roller coasters. By 1910, the amusement park was abandoned and dismantled.

Known today for their manufacture of fine silverware, the Oneida Community Plate Corporation Ltd. constructed their local corporate offices here by the 1940s. It was decided in the 1960s to construct an observation tower with a view of the falls from their north side. (The Seagram Tower, now the Tower Hotel, had been constructed in 1962 with a view from the south side). Billed as the area's first open-steel observation tower, it was opened for business by the 1964 tourist season. This tower was known as the Oneida Tower, and eventually as Kodak Tower.

== Amusement park ==
When Oneida relocated their offices in the late 1970s, York Hannover Developments Ltd. and Wost Holdings Ltd. invested $26 million in the creation of an amusement park concept after the site was cleared. Its initial annual payroll was $3 million. The park pre-dated the opening of Canada's Wonderland by two years, presumed at that point to cost $105 million when completed.

The three-story complex of Maple Leaf Village was constructed around the tower. It boasted a multi-screen movie theater, numerous attractions (through the years, the That's Incredible! museum and the Elvis Presley Museum were here), countless souvenir and apparel stores, Lillie Langtry's tavern and club and, in later years, the first locale for the Canadian comedy cabaret, Yuk-Yuk's. On the North side of the property was a complete carnival midway, complete with "North America's Largest" Ferris wheel, which, along with the tower (now called the Casino Tower) dominated the northern tourist skyline. As part of the Clifton Hill tourist area, the facility was well-received and attracted numerous crowds for years.

Eventually, however, the novelty began to wear thin as shops folded and main tenants relocated to other locations with more suitable infrastructure. Admission costs to the Kodak Tower were eliminated for a few years, until unsafe conditions closed the tower altogether in the early 1990s. At the end of the 1992 season, the amusement park closed down. In early spring of 1993, the Ferris wheel was dismantled and shipped to Asia for use there.

By January 1994, only a dozen shops remained in operation throughout the sprawling three-story structure. Redevelopment of the property was necessary, as many more shops were preferring on-street access in the burgeoning tourist area. The Maple Leaf Village Mall closed for the last time on February 1, 1995.

Casino Niagara opened in the building on December 7, 1996 and is still in operation today. The site was intended to be temporary, but the new site was filled by the Niagara Fallsview Casino Resort. The tower received a new look to reflect its more upscale surroundings, although there is currently no public access. It is now simply known as the Casino Tower and is being used as a large sign for the casino.

== See also ==
- Fallsview Casino
- Clifton Hill (Niagara Falls)
