= Fallsview Indoor Waterpark =

Indoor water park in Canada

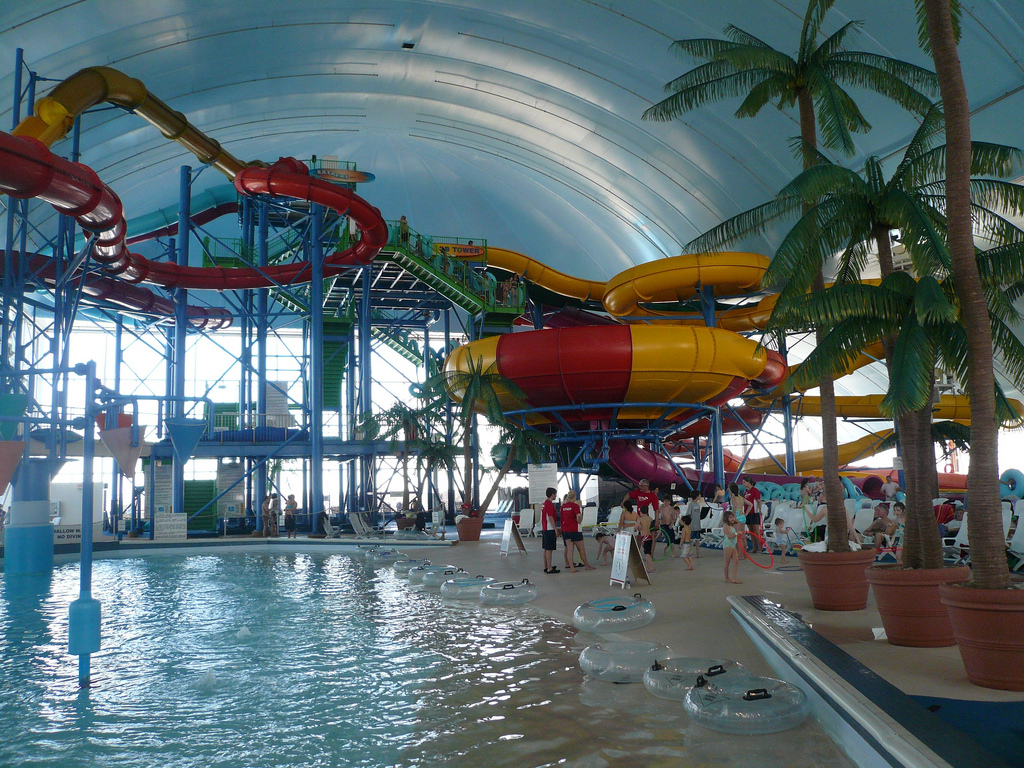
- Water slides at Fallsview Indoor Waterpark
- Interactive map of Fallsview Indoor Waterpark
- Location: Niagara Falls, Ontario, Canada
- Coordinates: 43.092459°N 79.070578°W
- Opened: 8 May 2006
- Previous names: Falls View Indoor Water Park
- Operating season: Year round (January–December)
- Area: 2.9 acres (12,000 m^{2})
- Pools: 7 pools
- Water slides: 16 water slides
- Website: Official Website

Fallsview Indoor Waterpark is located on 5685 Falls Avenue in Niagara Falls, Ontario, Canada.

== General information ==
The waterpark officially opened on 8 May 2006. More than 200,000 US gallons (760,000 L) of water are used to operate this facility. There is a water oasis spanning 125,000 square feet (2.9 acres) that features high-speed water slides among other water-related attractions. An interactive Atlantis-themed aquatic play area, along with an indoor wave pool and six swimming pools including multiple activity areas for water-related sports can be found on the premises. There is also an outdoor activity pool open year-round. Other attractions include a jungle-style beach for children to play in, a beach club-style restaurant and a bar. This waterpark is located on the top level of Casino Niagara's parking garage.

Located near Clifton Hill, people of all ages can dry off and enjoy the land-based museums and attractions that can be accessed within walking distance of the waterpark.

Fallsview Indoor Waterpark was closed for most of 2020 due to the COVID-19 pandemic.

== Slides and Attractions ==
- Extreme Racing Slides (Thunder, Kamakazi, Drop Canyon, Sky Screamer)
- Toob Tower
- Canadian Plunge
- Tidal Wave
- Sunnyside Patio & Pool
- Horseshoe Hot Springs
- Beach House (Niagara Tipping Bucket, Fallsview Beach, Tiny Tots Splash Park)
- The Beach Club
