= Casino Niagara =

Commercial casino in Ontario, Canada

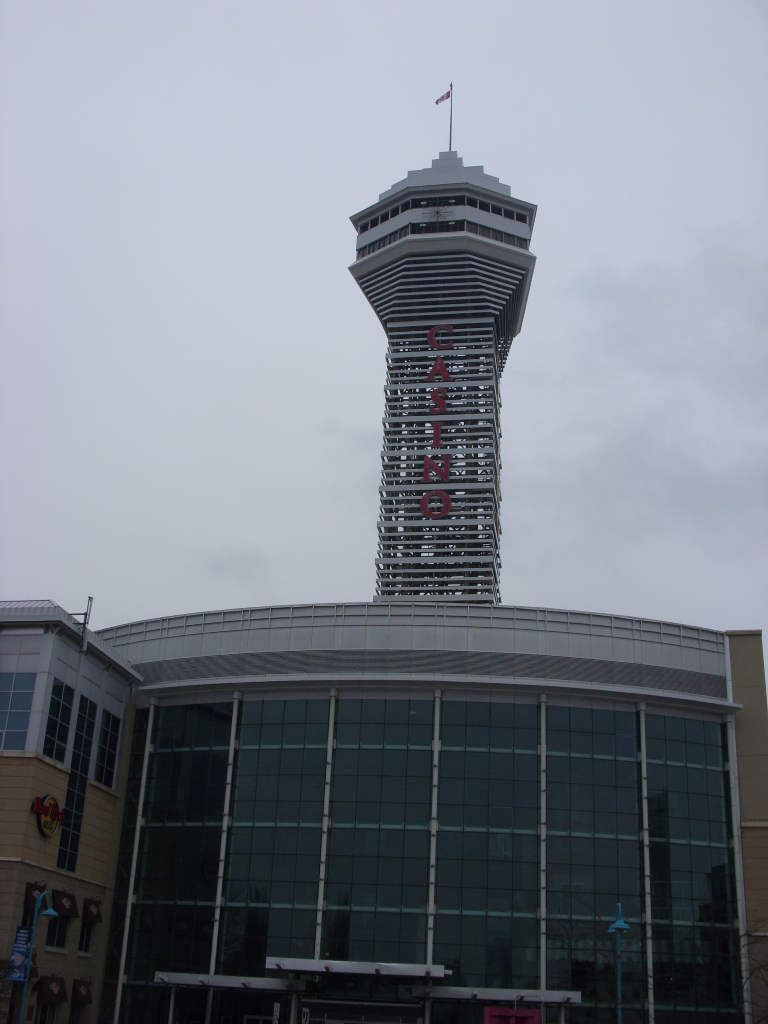
- Interactive map of Casino Niagara
- Location: 5705 Falls Avenue Niagara Falls, Ontario L2E 6T3; 43.092403°N 79.07066°W
- Opened: December 9, 1996
- Theme: Niagara Falls
- Gaming space: 95,000 sq ft (8,800 m^{2})
- Permanent shows: None
- Notable restaurants: The Market Buffet; Level 2 Sports Bar and Restaurant; Perks Café
- Casino type: Land-based
- Owner: Ontario Lottery and Gaming Corporation
- Operating license holder: Mohegan
- Website: CasinoNiagara.com

Casino Niagara is a commercial casino located in Niagara Falls, Ontario, Canada. It opened on December 9, 1996, on the site of the former Maple Leaf Village amusement park.

Casino Niagara has over 1,300 slots and over 40 table games, as well as sports betting.

== History ==
Located beside Clifton Hill, it opened in 1996 as Ontario's second casino. It was originally intended as a temporary casino until the completion of the larger Niagara Fallsview Casino Resort in 2004, but has continued to operate as a sister property ever since.

In 2017, the casino underwent a $7 million refurbishment, including upgrades to gaming technology and new machines, and a renovation of its second floor with the new LEV2L sports bar and a poker room.

On June 11, 2019, the Ontario Lottery and Gaming Corporation (OLG) announced a 21-year agreement with Mohegan Gaming and Entertainment to operate both Casino Niagara and the Fallsview.

== Facts and figures ==
- Casino floor size: 95,000 ft² (8,800 m²)
- Slot machines: 1300
- Slot tournament area
- Table games: more than 12
- Poker room tables: 26
- Restaurants: 1 - Level 2 Bar and Restaurant,
- Chill Bar and Level 2 Sports Bar
- Market buffet

== See also ==
- List of casinos in Canada
- Maid of the Mist
- Clifton Hill
- Skylon Tower
- Spanish Aerocar
- Casino Tower
- Sheraton on the Falls
- Crowne Plaza Niagara Falls – Fallsview
